= Heung Yee Kuk (constituency) =

Hong Kong functional constituency

Heung Yee Kuk 鄕議局
- Functional constituency for the Legislative Council of Hong Kong
- Region: Hong Kong
- Electorate: 155

Current constituency
- Created: 1991
- Number of members: One
- Member: Kenneth Lau (BPA)

Heung Yee Kuk
- Traditional Chinese: 鄕議局功能界別
- Simplified Chinese: 鄕议局功能界别
Transcriptions
Standard Mandarin
- Hanyu Pinyin: Xiāng Yì Jú Gōngnéng Jièbié
Yue: Cantonese
- Yale Romanization: Heung yíh guhk gūng nàhng gaai biht
- Jyutping: Hoeng1 ji5 guk6 gung1 nang4 gaai3 bit6

The Heung Yee Kuk functional constituency, formerly called the Rural functional constituency from 1991 to 1997, is a functional constituency in the elections for the Legislative Council of Hong Kong first created in 1991. The constituency is composed of the chairman and vice chairmen of the Heung Yee Kuk and the ex officio, special and co-opted councillors of the full Council of the Kuk. One of the functional constituencies with the fewest electorates, it had only 155 registered voters in 2020. It corresponds to the Heung Yee Kuk Subsector in the Election Committee.

Since the 2016 Legislative Council election, it has been represented by the chairman of the Kuk, Kenneth Lau, succeeding his father, former longtime Kuk chairman Lau Wong-fat who held the seat from 1991 to 2004 and from 2008 until he stepped down in 2016 due to his absence from the office because of ill health. Lau Wong-fat's tenure was interrupted when he represented the District Council functional constituency from 2004 to 2008 while Kuk vice chairman Lam Wai-keung took the seat in his place. From 1991 to now no actual election has been held as all candidates have been uncontested.

== Return members ==
Election	Member	Party
1991	Lau Wong-fat	FSHK→Liberal
1995	Lau Wong-fat	Liberal
Not represented in the PLC (1997–1998)
1998	Lau Wong-fat	Liberal
2000	Lau Wong-fat	Liberal
2004	Daniel Lam	Independent
2008	Lau Wong-fat	Liberal→Independent→Economic Synergy
2012	Lau Wong-fat	Economic Synergy→BPA
2016	Kenneth Lau	BPA
2021	Kenneth Lau	BPA
2025	Kenneth Lau	BPA

== Electoral results ==
Instant-runoff voting system was used from 1998 to 2021. Since 2021, first-past-the-post voting system is in use.

=== 2020s ===
2025 Legislative Council election: Heung Yee Kuk
Party	Candidate	Votes	%	±%
BPA	Kenneth Lau Ip-keung	119	83.80	+6.53
Independent	Lau Kai-hong	23	16.20	
Majority		96	67.6	
Total valid votes		142	100.00	
Rejected ballots		3		
Turnout		145	93.55	
Registered electors		155		
BPA hold		Swing		

2021 Legislative Council election: Heung Yee Kuk
Party	Candidate	Votes	%	±%
BPA	Kenneth Lau Ip-keung	119	77.27	
BPA	Mok Kam-kwai	35	22.72	
Majority		84	54.55	
Total valid votes		154	100.00	
Rejected ballots		0		
Turnout		154	95.65	
Registered electors		161		
BPA hold		Swing		

=== 2010s ===
2016 Legislative Council election: Heung Yee Kuk
Party	Candidate	Votes	%	±%
BPA	Kenneth Lau Ip-keung	Unopposed		
Registered electors		147		
BPA hold		Swing		

2012 Legislative Council election: Heung Yee Kuk
Party	Candidate	Votes	%	±%
Economic Synergy	Lau Wong-fat	Unopposed		
Registered electors		147		
Economic Synergy hold		Swing		

=== 2000s ===
2008 Legislative Council election: Heung Yee Kuk
Party	Candidate	Votes	%	±%
Liberal	Lau Wong-fat	Unopposed		
Registered electors		157		
Liberal gain from Independent		Swing		

2004 Legislative Council election: Heung Yee Kuk
Party	Candidate	Votes	%	±%
Independent	Lam Wai-keung	Unopposed		
Registered electors		149		
Independent gain from Independent		Swing		

2000 Legislative Council election: Heung Yee Kuk
Party	Candidate	Votes	%	±%
Liberal	Lau Wong-fat	Unopposed		
Registered electors		148		
Independent hold		Swing		

=== 1990s ===
1998 Legislative Council election: Heung Yee Kuk
Party	Candidate	Votes	%	±%
Independent	Lau Wong-fat	Unopposed		
Registered electors		132		
Independent hold		Swing		

1995 Legislative Council election: Rural
Party	Candidate	Votes	%	±%
Independent	Lau Wong-fat	Unopposed		
Registered electors		125		
Independent hold		Swing		

1991 Legislative Council election: Rural
Party	Candidate	Votes	%	±%
FSHK	Lau Wong-fat	Unopposed		
Registered electors		112		
FSHK win (new seat)				
