= Anti-Hong Kong Express Rail Link movement =

Railway protests in Hong Kong

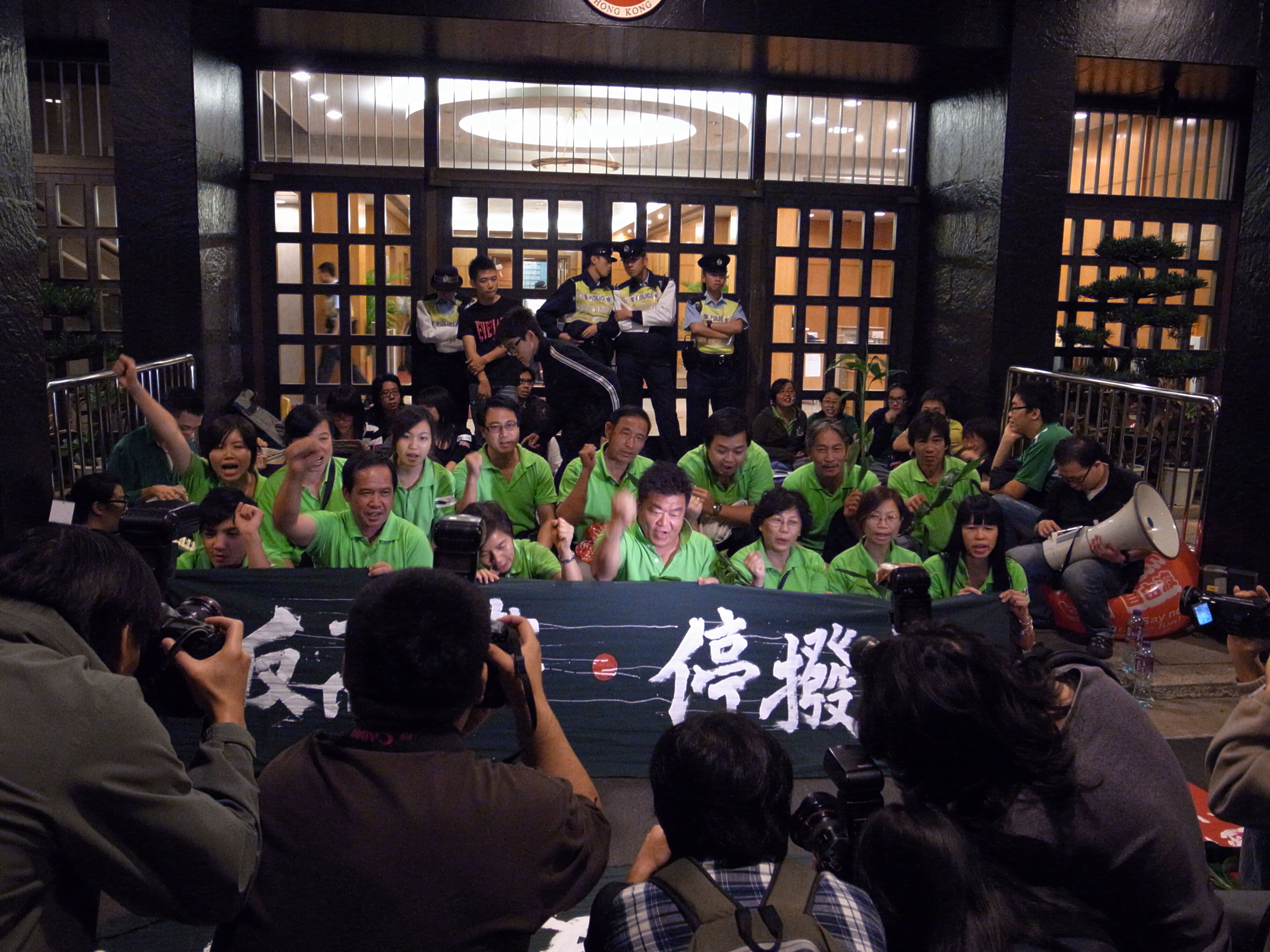
- Villagers of the to-be-demolished Tsoi Yuen Chuen in front of HK Government offices in November 2009
- Date: 2009–2010
- Location: Legislative Council Building, Central Government Offices, Hong Kong
- Participants: HK Govt., LegCo, Pan-democrat social activists, Hong Kong residents
- Outcome: The bill passed in the LegCo. The XRL started constructions in 2010.

Anti-Hong Kong Express Rail Link movement
- Traditional Chinese: 反高鐵運動
- Simplified Chinese: 反高铁运动
- Literal meaning: anti-high-speed-rail movement
Transcriptions
Standard Mandarin
- Hanyu Pinyin: Fǎn Gāotiě Yùndòng
Yue: Cantonese
- Yale Romanization: Fáan gōu tit wahn duhng
- Jyutping: Faan2 gou1 tit3 wan6 dung6

A social movement and period of civil discontent in Hong Kong between mid-2009 and early 2010 centered around opposition to the Hong Kong Express Rail Link. Groups of Hong Kong residents protested the proposal, a high-speed railway that would link Hong Kong with mainland China's growing high-speed rail network.

== Background ==
Segments of the general public and various interest groups opposed to certain aspects of the Hong Kong section of the project mobilised through petitions, marches, hunger-strikes, and rallies to express their discontent at the government's insistence on pushing through the project. They cited cost, noise pollution, customs and border control complications, and pre-existing rail links as main reasons for the opposition.

Pan-democracy legislators questioned the project rationale within the Legislative Council of Hong Kong (LegCo), while civil groups held vigils outside LegCo during the debate. The January protest was also called the "siege of Legco" by local media. Ultimately, the movement was unsuccessful in impeding the government's plans to build the railway.

== Protest timeline ==
=== November 2009 ===
On 29 November 2009, a demonstration of more than 1,000 people protesting against the construction of the Express Rail link gained the attention of the local media when a group of 100 people engaged in a sit-in protest in front of the government headquarters in Central.

=== December 2009 ===
On 18 December 2009, the funding application was debated in the Finance Committee of the Legislative Council. A demonstration of an estimated 1,000 to 2,000 people was staged around the Legislative Council Building. The debate was put on hold and the funding was not yet finalised.

=== January 2010 ===
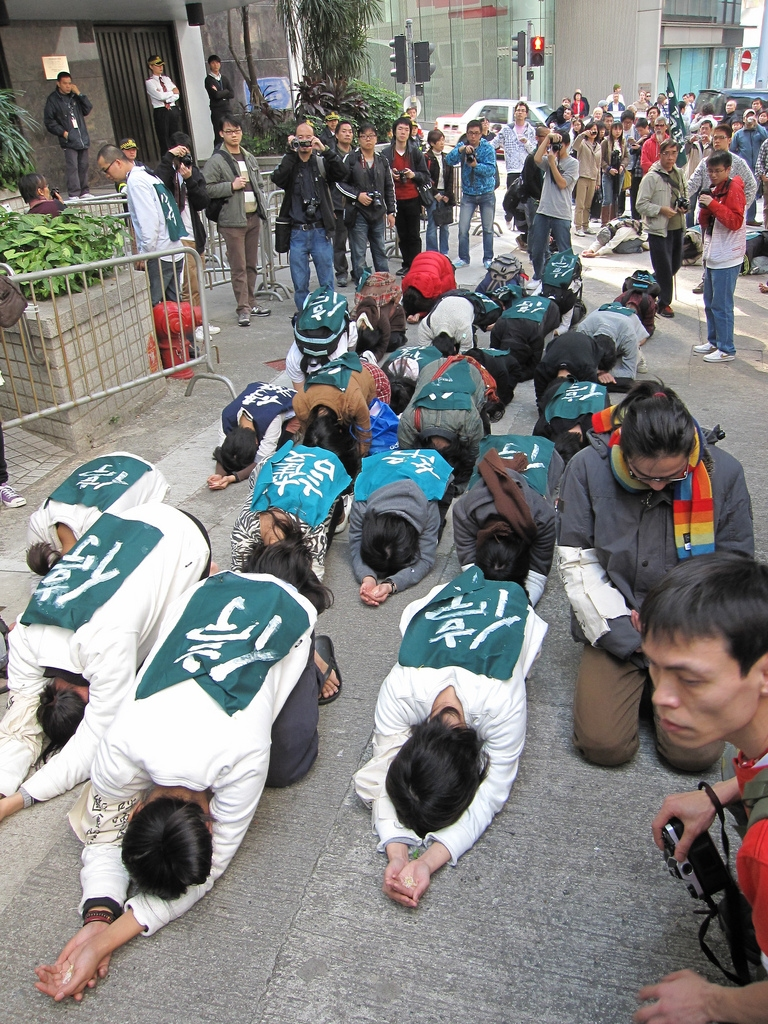
Prostrating walk by citizens. A group of people prostrating in line each wearing a green top with the Chinese character for stop the bill of Express Rail Link.

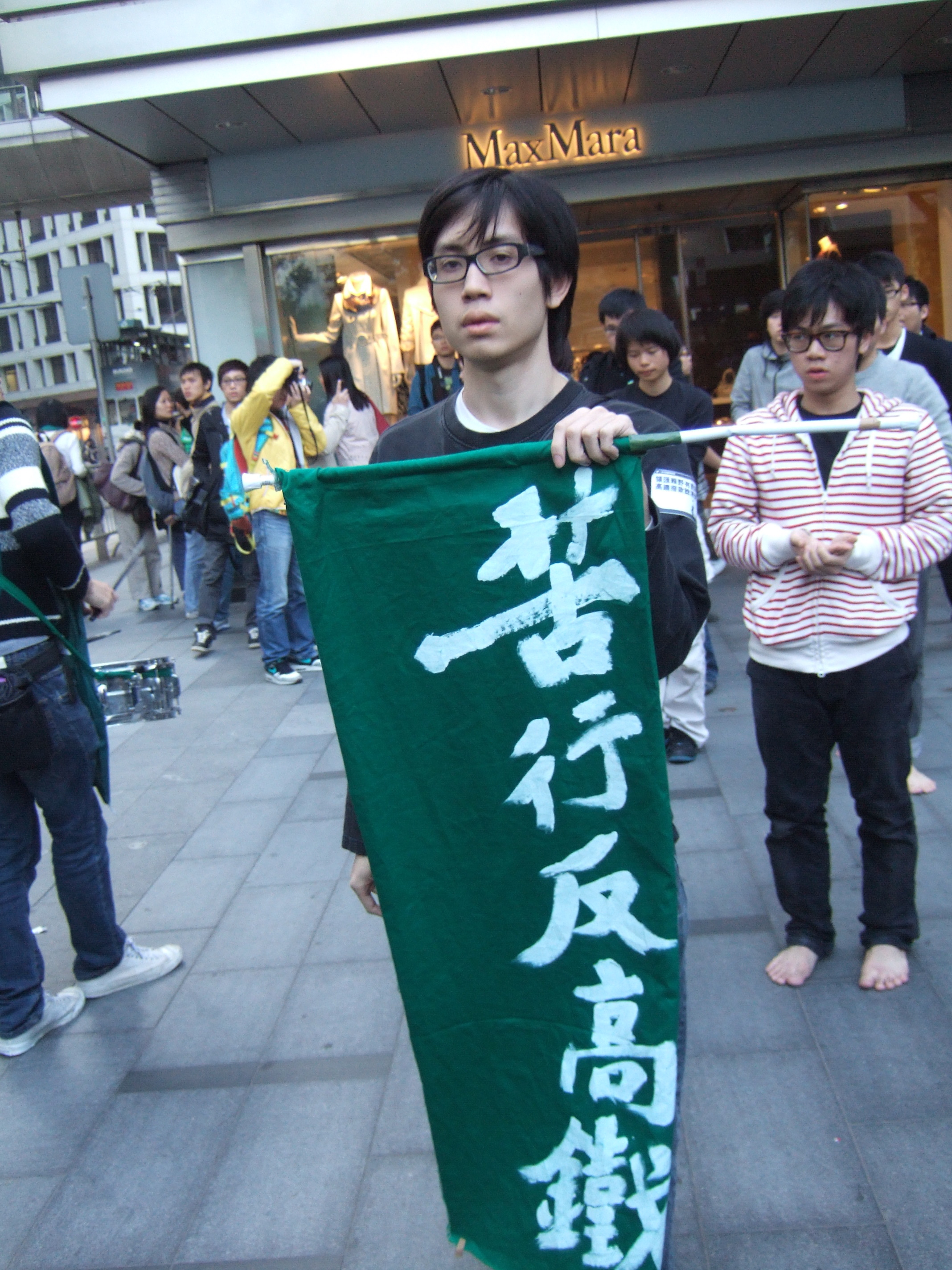
Lead marcher of prostrating walk. People wearing spectacles carrying a green banner with the words '苦行反高鐵' (penance against High-speed rail link) leading a group of protesters.

A group performed a "prostrating walk" (苦行) imitating Tibetan pilgrims, dubbing it the "Prostrating Walk of the Five Districts", in which participants kneel down and touch the ground with their heads every 26 steps (to symbolise the length of the rail link), from 5 to 8 January. Protesters also walked around the LegCo building in a similar fashion during the protest from 15 to 16 January.

A series of disputes and arguments were held in and out of the HK legislative council chamber for four weeks. Lawmakers that were for or against the line traded insults during debate that lasted 25 hours straight. On 15 January, hundreds of young protesters swarmed the government house gates.

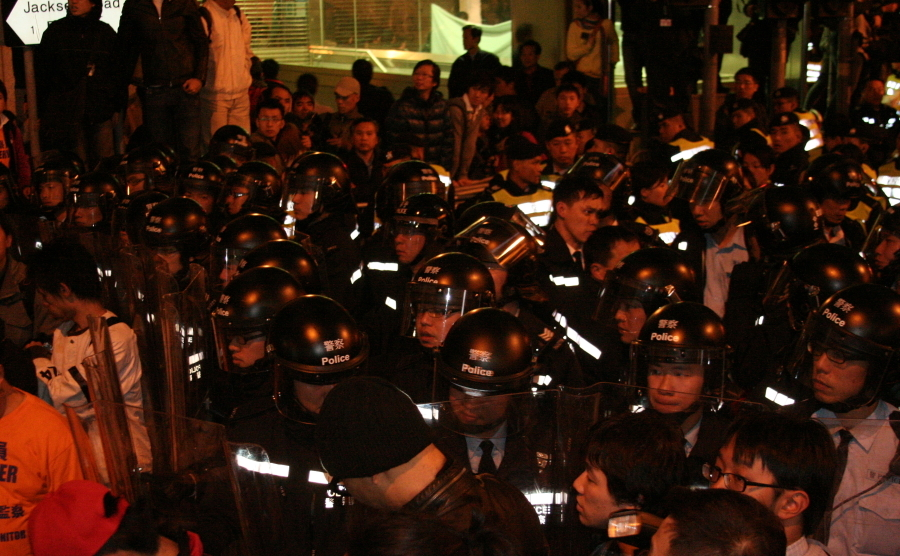
Police in riot gear assembled in road adjacent to the LegCo

On the morning of 16 January, protests carried on, along with the debates inside the LegCo building. About 10,000 people showed up at the peak according to organizers. Police gave the figure of 1,700. About 1,200 police officers were involved. Just before the approval of the budget at around 18:00, an initial group of people attempted to storm the Legislative Council Building, but was blocked by the police. Scuffles broke out as the police used pepper spray on the citizens while they covered their face with sheets of plastic wrap.

Armed with mobile devices and communicating via Twitter, protesters quickly moved into 6 separating strategic positions on the streets around the LegCo building, blocking all the exits. Eva Cheng and other pro-government legislators were trapped inside the Legco building until 17 January. Blogger Martin Oei drew a detailed strategic map showing the distribution of police and protesters, and gave an estimation of about 1700 protesters in that night. The crowd that surrounded the building promised Eva Cheng her safety if she would only come out to talk. She did not.

The pro-Beijing DAB had to be escorted out of the building while the crowd chanted "shame". Five police officers were injured.

=== February 2010 ===
On 15 February 2010, and shadowing the tradition of Lau Wong Fat of the Heung Yee Kuk, about 20 post-80s generation anti-rail representatives joined the annual HK kau cim tradition at Che Kung temple, Sha Tin to draw three divination sticks for the year of the Tiger. They said the fortune of the city should not depend on unelected, unrepresentative business/political personalities leaders. Two 'mid' sticks were drawn with No. 89 and No. 24, along with one 'misfortune' stick. The misfortune stick No. 74 was interpreted as 凡事待遲 (roughly translated as "Everything should be carried out later").

== Reasons for opposition ==
The opposition was initiated by media activists already active in high key campaigns such as the struggle for the preservation of the Star Ferry Pier in Edinburgh Place in 2006 and Queen's Pier in 2007, at the outset, only focused on saving Choi Yuen Tsuen village, which was built by residents over four decades. Yet, while activists worked on ways to solve the problem, they found many inconsistencies with the government's plan and decided to oppose the rail link as a whole. The rail link was regarded as sacrificing the interests of the common people to a small minority of economic elites.

Besides possible damage to the environment during its construction and operation, the rail link would cost HK$69.9 billion (US$9 billion), while the projected returns over 50 years would only be $80 billion. A village along the track, Choi Yuen Tsuen, home to about 500 people, would have to be dismantled. Tai Kok Tsui residents said the railway would cause unbearable noise pollution to residents in some districts and could cause a number of old buildings with poor foundations to collapse.

A number of different groups, ranging from environmentalists to the affected villagers, opposed the project for different reasons. With regular demonstrations, the collection of signatures and various other forms of protest, they attempted to raise awareness among the population and to exert pressure upon the respective politicians. By the end of June 2009, more than 10,000 signatures opposing plans for the railway had been collected.

Doubts have also been cast on the official projections and plans for the national rail link. While the rail link was designed to connect to the high-speed national rail network at Shibi, Guangzhou, reports showed that nearly 80% of the trains would actually end in Shenzhen. Hong Kong's Pro-democracy camp has said that the project will only benefit developers.

Meanwhile, Mirana Szeto, a member of the Stop XRL Alliance compared the civil opposition to the 1989 Tiananmen Square protests in Beijing some 20 years earlier. "They want the government to stop collusion and corruption, and wanted to fight for democracy". The Professional Commons, a think tank of the Civic Party (a pro-democracy party), reportedly exposed many flaws in the project through testimonials from rail experts. According to some government members, who opted for a purely generational analysis of the phenomenon, many among the younger generations feel helpless in today's society where it is impossible to move forward or up..

However, other observers regard them as a new civil force bringing along a positive project for Hong Kong. Through its discourse on a more inclusive developmental approach, an encompassing form of democracy and the decolonisation of the territory it has developed during its various urban campaigns, the movement is regarded as striving for the emancipation of both the city and the citizen. Cultural critic Law Wing-Sang regarded the opposition to the Guangzhou-Hong Kong Express Rail Link as the first step of the collapse of the dominant ideology and analysed the movement as having initiated the process of decolonisation of Hong Kong, where local economic elites and colonizers have historically worked hand in hand with each other, in what he termed collaborative colonial power. Ma Ngok, another prominent political observer, also supported the protesters, and regarded the "black box" process through which the project of the Rail Link was arrived at as epitomising the structural governance problem of the Hong Kong administration.

== Final approval ==
The pro-establishment lawmakers who form a majority in the legislature approved the funding at 31 votes to 21 in 2010, with 30 pro-establishment members and 1 pro-democracy member voting for it, while 21 pro-democracy members voted against it. The government's HK$2 billion compensation for affected residents was approved 30–0, as pan-democratic lawmakers stormed out in protest.
