= Federation for the Stability of Hong Kong =

Federation for the Stability of Hong Kong 穩定香港協會
- Chairman: Chan Yat-sen
- Vice-Chairmen: Lau Wong-fat; Cheung Yan-lung; Lee Lin-sang; Lau Sam-po
- Founded: 16 May 1991
- Dissolved: 4 June 2010
- Merged into: Hong Kong Progressive; Alliance
- Ideology: Conservatism (HK)
- Political position: Centre-right
- Regional affiliation: Pro-Beijing camp

The Federation for the Stability of Hong Kong (Chinese: 穩定香港協會, abbreviated 穩港協; FSHK) was a pro-Beijing rural political group representing the interests of the New Territories indigenous inhabitants active in the 1990s.

== History ==
The Federation was incorporated on 16 May 1991, consisting of a number prominent rural leaders such as Chan Yat-sen as the Chairman and Lau Wong-fat as the Vice-Chairman, both had been the Chairmen of the Heung Yee Kuk. Cheung Yan-lung, another leader of the Heung Yee Kuk and Chairman of the Regional Council of Hong Kong was also Vice-Chairman of the Federation. Two other Vice-Chairmen included Lee Lin-sang, the chairman of the New Territories Association of Societies and Lau Sam-po, chairman of the New Territories Federation of Industries. Members included also the Hong Kong Affairs Advisers, District Affairs Advisers, National People's Congress deputies and Chinese People's Political Consultative Conference members. It held three seats in the Legislative Council of Hong Kong after the 1991 general election, including Tai Chin-wah, Gilbert Leung and Lau Wong-fat.

Gilbert Leung and Lau Wong-fat joined the Co-operative Resources Centre launched by the pro-business faction in the Legislative Council in December 1991, which later transformed into the Liberal Party. After the creation of the pro-democracy Democratic Party in April 1994, the Federation formed coalition with other pro-Beijing groups by setting up a joint meeting with the Hong Kong Chinese Reform Association and the New Hong Kong Alliance. Members of the groups later on formed the 52-member new political party Hong Kong Progressive Alliance in April 1994.

The Federation became inactive since then. It was dissolved on 4 June 2010.

== See also ==
- Politics of Hong Kong
- List of political parties in Hong Kong
