= Chan Yat-san =

Hong Kong politician (1919–2007)

Chan Yat-san MBE JP
- 陳日新

Chairman of the Heung Yee Kuk
- In office 1962–1964
- Preceded by: Ho Chuen-yiu
- Succeeded by: Cheung Yan-lung
- In office 1968–1978
- Preceded by: Pang Fu-wa
- Succeeded by: Wong Yuen-cheung

Personal details
- Born: August 21, 1919 So Kwun Wat, New Territories
- Died: 27 July 2007 (aged 90) St. Teresa's Hospital, Kowloon
- Party: Federation for the Stability of Hong Kong
- Education: Chung Sing School, Yuen Long
- Occupation: Politician

Chan Yat-san (Chinese: 陳日新; 21 August 1919 – 27 July 2007) was a Hong Kong politician and rural leader. He was a New Territories indigenous inhabitant and chairman of the powerful Heung Yee Kuk, and was dubbed the "King of the New Territories".

== Early life ==
Chan was born in 1919 in the small village of So Kwun Wat near Tuen Mun. His father ran medicine shops and a restaurant while his mother looked after the family fields. In 1940, he worked for colonial government as a food investigator for Tuen Mun and outlying islands. This job was part of an effort to gauge food supplies during the Battle of Hong Kong. Chan fled to Mainland during the Japanese occupation.

After the Communist victory in the Chinese Civil War, the Kuomintang authorities on Taiwan were anxious to influence rising leaders in Hong Kong. Chan went to Taiwan in 1952 and reportedly studied politics. He had close links with Kuomintang figures in Hong Kong.

== Career ==
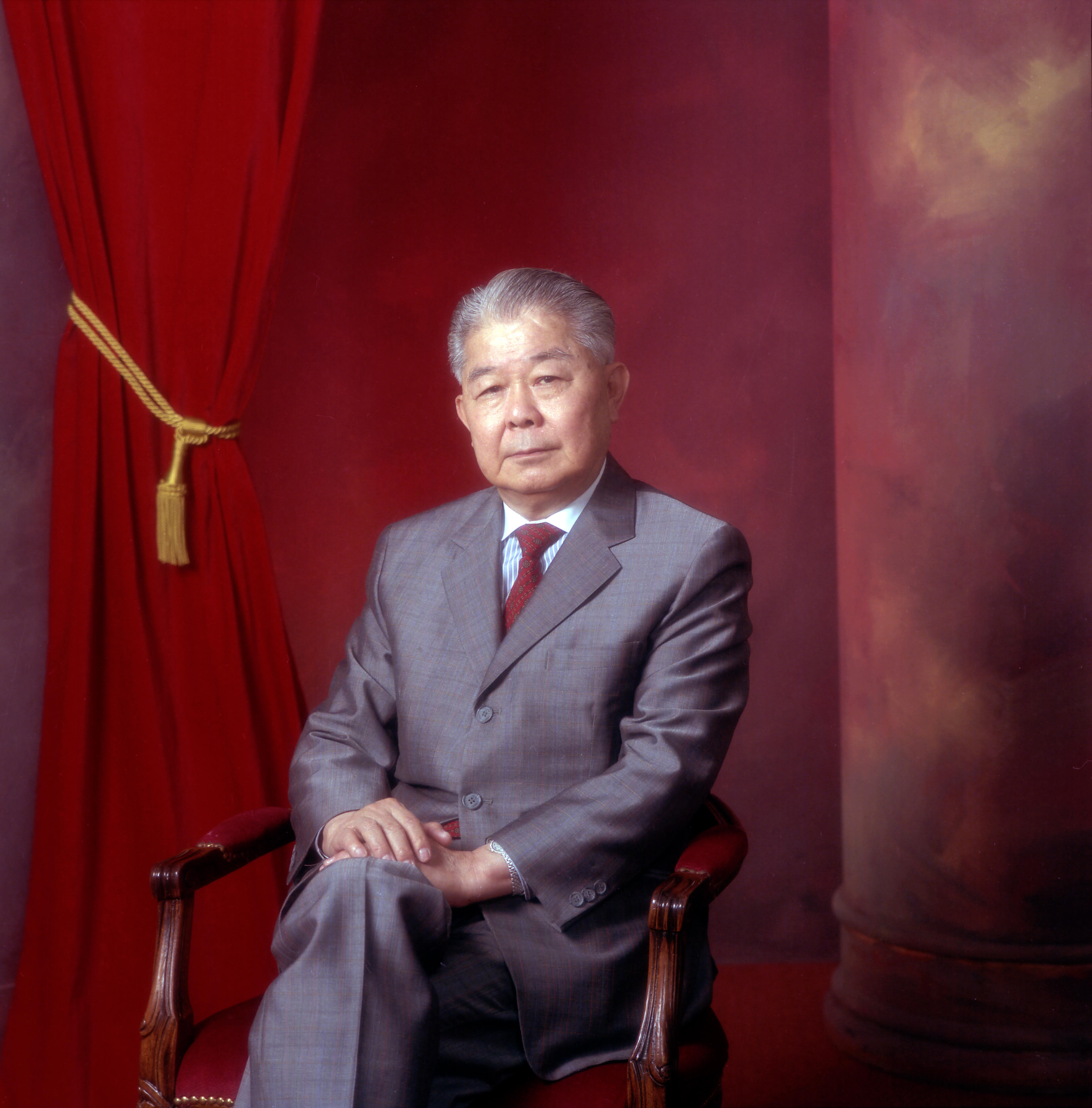
Chan's portrait

=== Rural politics ===
He entered local politics and when he became the Chairman of the Tuen Mun Rural Committee in 1954. By 1962, he was elected Chairman of the Heung Yee Kuk. He stepped down as chairman in 1964 but was again elected in 1968 which he held the post until 1978 when he declared his retirement from politics. By then the Kuk had gained the ear and confidence of the government.

Chan helped deliver the backing of rural clansmen during the Hong Kong 1967 Leftist riots when the colonial government was seeking public support. He was given a licence to carry a revolver for protection as the Leftist rioters labeled him as anti-China traitor. Chan was made a Member of the Order of the British Empire afterwards and regained the Chairmanship of the Kuk.

As Chairman of the Kuk, Chan took an interest in Lau Wong-fat who was a talented young man from the Tuen Mun area who showed an aptitude for politics. Lau was subsequently elected Chairman of the Kuk in 1980 and still retained that post until 2015. Tsing Shan Estate, the first public housing estate in Tuen Mun, was renamed San Fat Estate after him and Lau Wong-fat.

=== Handover period ===
After Chan stepped down from active politics in 1978, he kept a close eye on current affairs. During the Sino-British negotiations and the Sino-British Joint Declaration, he was concerned with securing the rights and privileges of indigenous villagers after the transfer of sovereignty over Hong Kong to China. He was invited by the Chinese government to the Hong Kong Basic Law Consultative Committee and became a member of the Chinese People's Political Consultative Conference.

In the 1991 Legislative Council elections after the Tiananmen massacre, he saw the rise of the pro-democracy camp. To counter the liberal movement and assure stability over the handover period, Chan founded the political group Federation for the Stability of Hong Kong and elected as the chairman at the age of 74. In 1993, he was member of the Preliminary Working Committee of the Hong Kong SAR.

Chan died at St Teresa's Hospital on 27 July 2007 at the age of 90.

== Personal life ==
Besides politics, Chan Yat-san was also a businessman and investor. He lived in a mansion in Kowloon Tong and was driven from there to the Kowloon Tong Club in a Rolls-Royce. He played mahjong several times a week. He owned at least six other properties in Kowloon Tong valued at more than HK$700 million.
