= 1998 Hong Kong legislative election in New Territories West =

- 24 May 1998

All 5 New Territories West seats to the Legislative Council
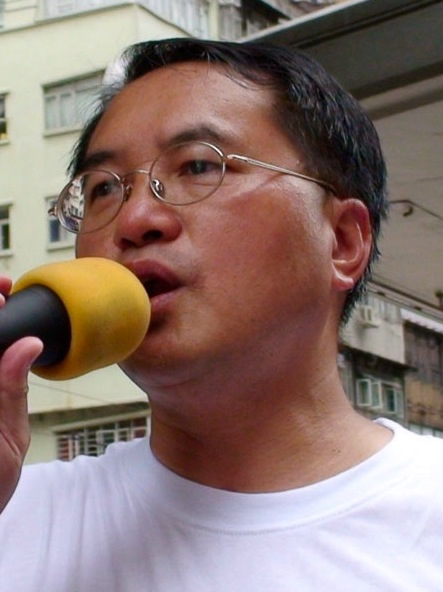

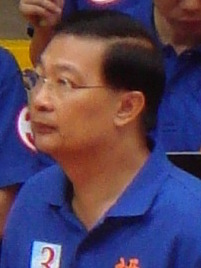

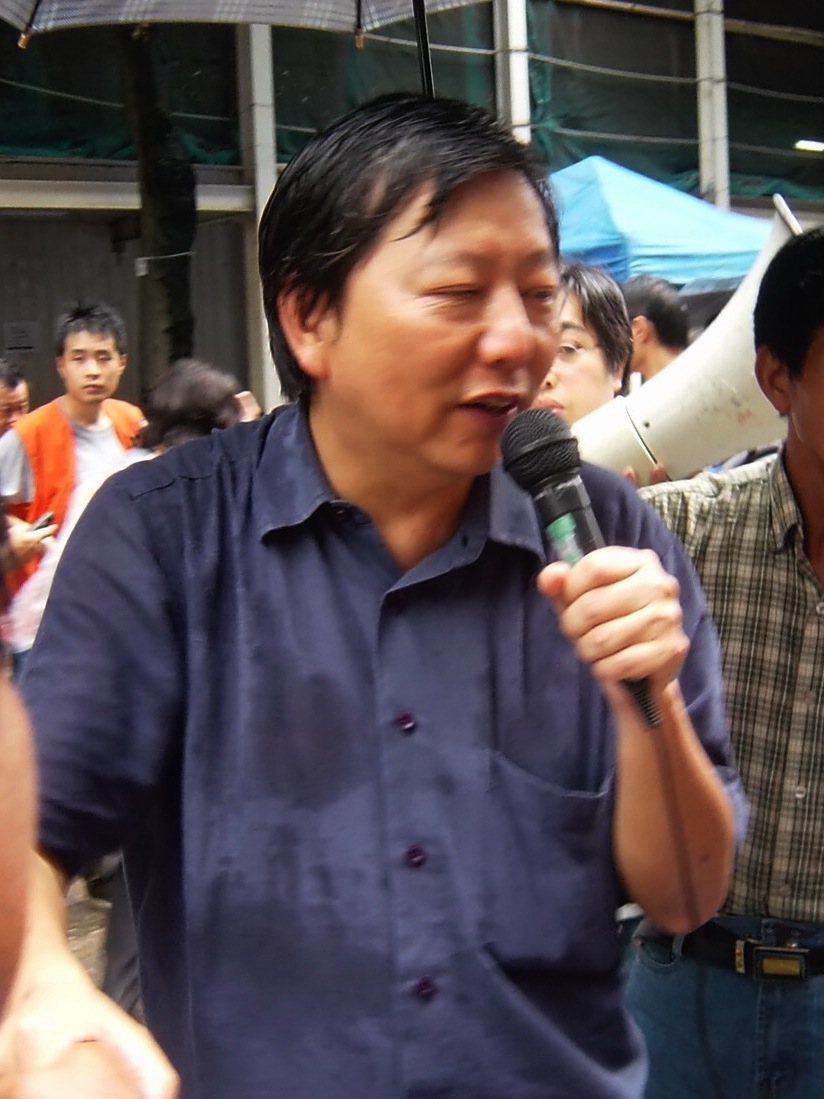

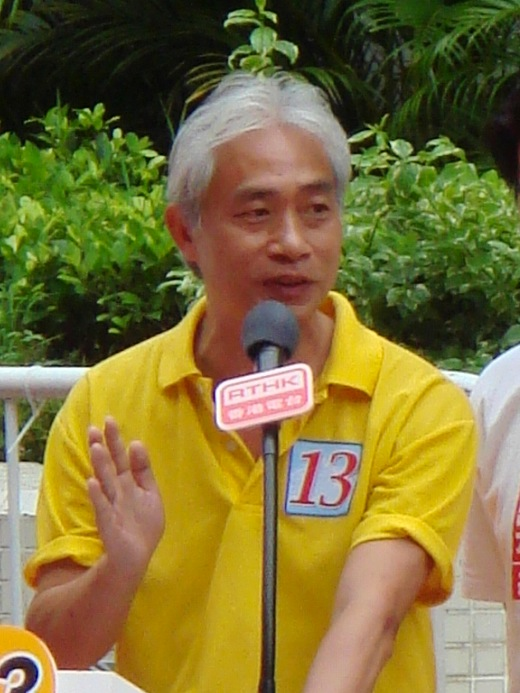
	First party	Second party
Leader	Lee Wing-tat & Albert Ho	Tam Yiu-chung
Party	Democratic	DAB
Alliance	Pro-democracy camp	Pro-Beijing camp
Seats won	2	1
Popular vote	147,098	72,587
Percentage	39.2%	19.4%
	Third party	Fourth party
Leader	Lee Cheuk-yan	Leung Yiu-chung
Party	Frontier	Independent
Alliance	Pro-democracy	Pro-democracy
Seats won	1	1
Popular vote	38,627	38,627
Percentage	12.5%	10.3%

These are the New Territories West results of the 1998 Hong Kong legislative election. The election was held on 24 May 1998 and all 6 seats in the newly established New Territories West, which consists of Tsuen Wan District, Tuen Mun District, Yuen Long District, Kwai Tsing District and Islands District, were contested. The Democratic Party became the biggest victors by winning two seats with Lee Wing-tat and Albert Ho, which was followed by Democratic Alliance for the Betterment of Hong Kong's Tam Yiu-chung and The Frontier's Lee Cheuk-yan and independent Leung Yiu-chung.

== Overall results ==
After election:

↓
4	1
Pro-democracy	Pro-Beijing

Party	Seats	Contesting list(s)	Votes	%
Democratic	2	1	147,098	39.2
Frontier	1	1	38,627	12.5
ADPL	0	1	19,500	5.2
123DA	0	1	3,050	0.8
Independent	1	3	50,771	13.5
Pro-democracy camp	4	7	259,046	69.0
DAB	1	1	72,587	19.4
Liberal	0	1	3,138	0.8
Independent	0	2	32,333	8.6
Pro-Beijing camp	1	4	108,058	28.8
Turnout:			377,215	53.3

== Candidates list ==
Legislative Election 1998: New Territories West
List	Candidates	Votes	Of total (%)	± from prev.
Democratic	Lee Wing-tat, Ho Chun-yan Zachary Wong Wai-yin, Josephine Chan Shu-ying	147,098	39.21 (20%+19.21)	
DAB	Tam Yiu-chung Leung Che-cheung, Chau Chuen-heung, Chan Wan-sang, Hui Chiu-fai	72,587	19.35	
Frontier	Lee Cheuk-yan Ip Kwok-fun	46,696	12.45	
Nonpartisan	Leung Yiu-chung	38,627	10.30	
Nonpartisan	Lam Wai-keung, Tai Kuen, Chow Ping-tim, Chan Ka-mun, Tso Shiu-wai	25,905	6.91	
ADPL	Yim Tim-sang	19,500	5.2	
Nonpartisan	Ting Yin-wah	11,176	2.98	
Independent	Yeung Fuk-kwong	6,428	1.71	
Liberal	Paul Chan Sing-kong, Liu Kwong-sang, Wong Kwok-keung	3,138	0.84	
123DA	Yum Sin-ling, Christopher Chu, Mak Ip-sing, Shung King-fai	3,050	0.81	
Pioneer	Lam Chi-leung	968	0.26	
Total valid votes		375,173	100.00	
Rejected ballots		2,042		
Turnout		377,215	53.25	
Registered electors		708,443		

== See also ==
- Legislative Council of Hong Kong
- Hong Kong legislative elections
- 1998 Hong Kong legislative election
