= Pro-Beijing =

Pro-Beijing may refer to:

- Pro-Beijing camp (disambiguation)
- United front (China)
  - United front in Hong Kong
  - United front in Taiwan

== See also ==
- Pro-China (disambiguation)
- Anti–People's Republic of China sentiment or "anti-Beijing"
- Chinese nationalism (Neo-nationalism#China)
- Sinophile
