= Waiting for Uncle Fat =

Hong Kong Internet slang term

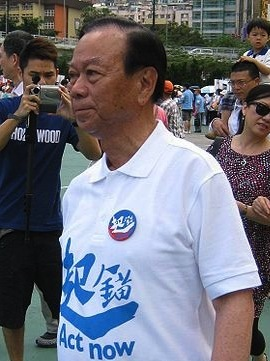
Lau wong-fat

Waiting for Uncle Fat is a Hong Kong Internet slang term and an internet meme; “Uncle Fat” is the nickname of rural patriarch Lau Wong-fat. The expression is derived from the 2015 Hong Kong electoral reform vote, when the 31 pro-Beijing camp lawmakers walked out of the chamber just before the vote in order to wait for Uncle Fat to arrive and vote to show their unity. The voting results turned out to be an embarrassing eight votes supporting the reform package. The pro-Beijing camp parties’ reason for not attending the vote – to wait for Uncle Fat – has sparked an intense discussion about the method the pro-establishment parties had used among Hong Kong citizens. Even more, "waiting for Uncle Fat" has become Internet slang and many derivative works or parodies have been created by Hong Kong netizens according to this slang.

== Background ==
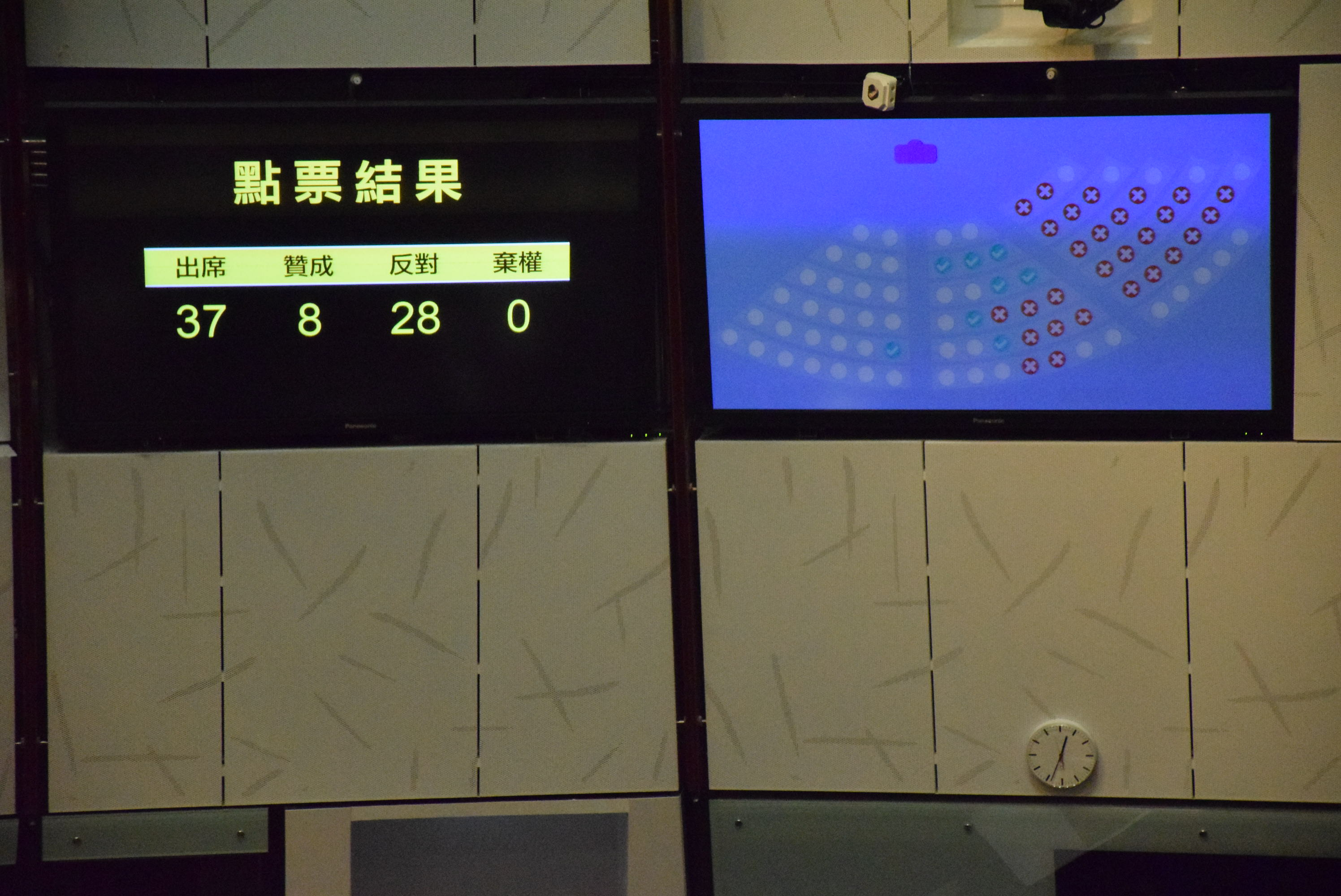
The bill was vetoed with the unexpected 8 vs 28 large margin

The members in Hong Kong's Legislative Council can be separated as pro-establishment and pro-democracy. Passage of bills introduced by the government shall require at least a simple majority vote of the members of the Legislative Council present, so the number of the pro-establishment members are not enough to let the political reform proposal pass. As before voting, the pro-democracy party expressed a strong disagreement towards the proposal and due to the rule of majority vote, the pro-establishment parties can predict that the proposal will be denied eventually. As half of the Hong Kong citizen oppose the reform proposal, in order to avoid public's outrage, they chose to be absent when voting. The bill was denied with only eight supports and the pro-establishment party used the excuse of waiting for Uncle Fat to show their unity and avoid taking a stand.

== Related results ==
=== Chief Executive selection of Hong Kong in 2017 ===
Since only eight members of the legislative council approved the proposal while twenty-eight members refused it, the method for the selection of the chief executive was negatived. That means in 2017, the rules or format of the selection may follow the past election, like 2012. In addition, Hong Kong citizens did not have the right to vote during the 2017 chief executive selection. The most possible and fastest time for them to vote is not sooner than 2022.

=== Relation between members of Pro-Beijing camp ===
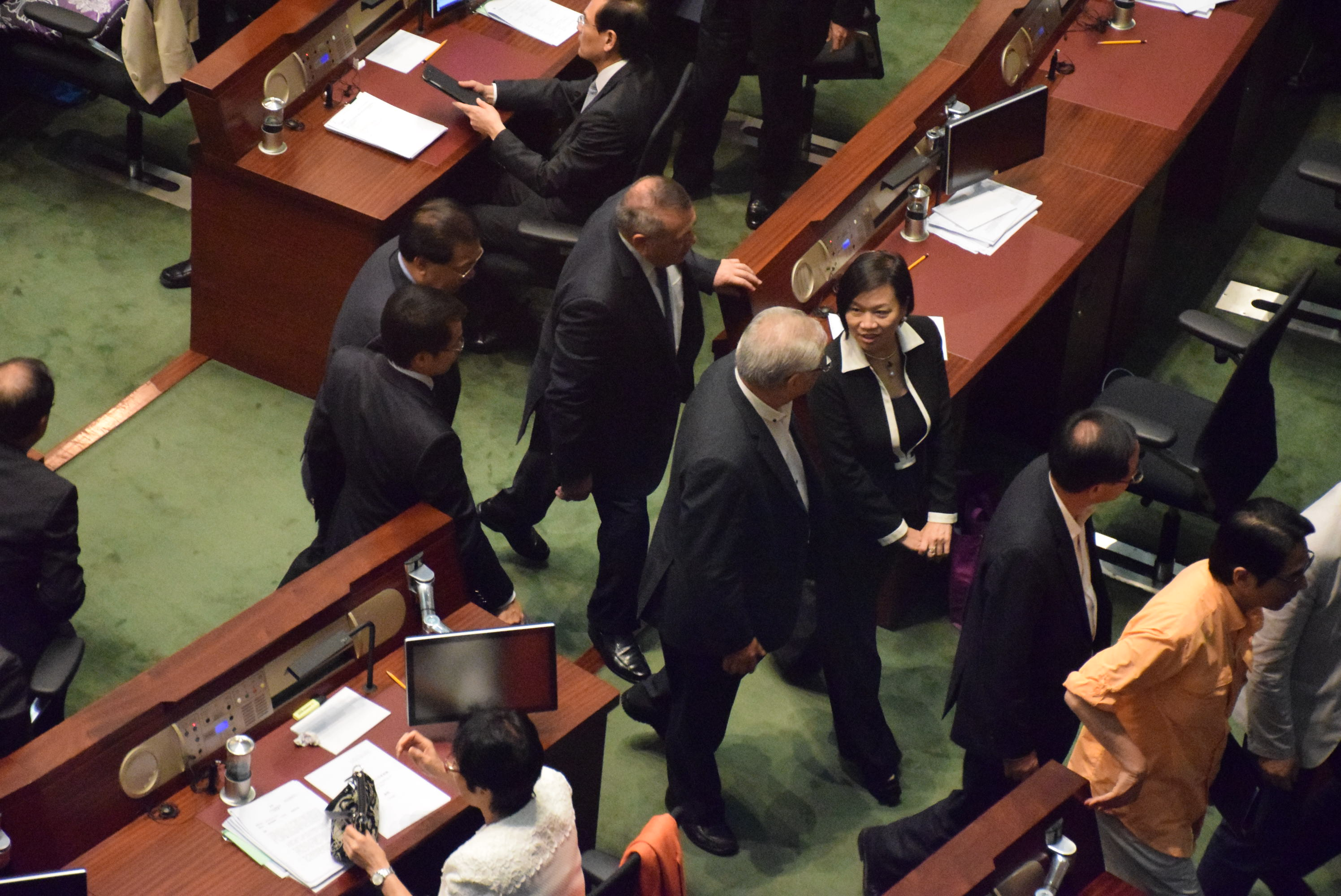
Pro-Beijing legislators, who intended to produce a failure of quorum, were leaving the chamber during voting.

After the voting of the proposal, the relationship between the members of Pro-Beijing camp is also a concerned issue. Since there were still eight members inside the chamber while there were total 31 stayed out the chamber, the public doubted that their communication was insufficient and the discrepancy appeared. The media also exposed their WhatsApp group conversation and discovered that they did not communicate before going out the chamber. On the other hand, they tried to punish each other after the voting. Wong Kwok-kin, a member from the Hong Kong Federation of Trade Unions, blamed that Regina Ip and Tam Yiu-chung did not consider comprehensively, and had already angered the central government. However, Ip said that she was just following the action of DAB, which is the largest Pro-Beijing camp political party. The objection of this motion has shown the discrepancy of the Pro-Beijing parties.

=== ‘Waiting for Uncle Fat’ becoming a trendy political phrase ===
The pro-Beijing camps used ‘Wait for Uncle Fat’ as an excuse for their blunder; this phrase soon became a trendy slang term. Other than derivative works, people also use this phrase in the daily life, especially when they are having conversation with others. The literal meaning is wait for Uncle Fat, but the real meaning is want to shirk the responsibility. This is also a kind of sarcasm to this accident.

Examples:

1. When we are being late:

A: "Hey! Why are you so late?"

B: "Because I need to wait for uncle Fat!"

2. When you want to decline some requirements:

C: "When can you hand in your proposal?"

D: "Give me some time please. I want to wait for uncle Fat."

== Criticism and feedback ==
Several people have shown their opinion and attitude towards the event. Jeffrey Lam Kin Fung from the pro-establishment Business and Professionals Alliance thought waiting for uncle fat is showing their unity. But both James Tien Pei Chun and Felix Chung Kwok Pan from liberal party thought it is ridiculous, Tien said that "It is no need to wait for uncle fat, it is a nonsense!" Some other lawmakers like Tam Yiu Chung and Regina Ip thought they have failed in their plan and communication which led to an unexpected result. Jasper Tsang, The Legislative Council president just described the event as an ‘unfortunate accident’. The Pro-democracy lawmakers felt puzzled about it as most of their opponents had left the room. Leung Kwok Hung from the League of Social Democrats said that ‘the pro-establishment camp are cowards’ because of their leaving. A Facebook page named ‘The Wait for Uncle Fat’ was created after the event and received more than 3000 likes in the first two hours which expressed how the citizens felt about it.

== Raising awareness ==
‘Waiting for uncle fat is then become a slang in Hong Kong, especially existed in social media sites. It is also widely used among citizens to ridicule the pro-establishment camp. Several questions are raised after the event, like whether uncle Fat should take his responsibility to quit the legislative council, whether the pro-establishment camp made a right choice of waiting for uncle fat and also the capability of the pro-establishment camp. After the event, the ability of the member of the pro-establishment camp is being suspended, Apple Daily reported that the members of the camp are lack of critical and logical thinking. It also mentioned that the pro-establishment camp is lack of communication and thus led to the event.

== Derivative works (parody) ==
=== Pictures ===
A series of altered pictures is posted on different media like Twitter and Facebook by the netizens. These pictures make fun of Uncle Fat being late in a parodic way; for example, make Uncle Fat holding a speaker saying “Sorry, I am Late” in a picture. Another example is that creating a cartoon style of Uncle Fat called Mr. Uncle Fat, saying “Sorry, the land problem”.

=== Musical parody ===
A musical parody named “Uncle Fat too late” was launched on the YouTube channel "Sing To Say" and was posted on Hong Kong Golden Forum. It received over 20,000 views within two days of being uploaded to YouTube. It is written by reusing the melody of the Cantonese pop song ”Never too late”, sung by singer Leo Ku. The parodist reworked the lyrics by teasing Uncle Fat's being late to the vote.

=== Facebook page ===
A Facebook page titled "The Wait for Uncle Fat" attracted about 3,000 likes in the first two hours. Various kinds of memes, videos and jokes about the politician have been posted and comments from netizens have been drawn to it.
