= Lung Kwu Tan =

Area of Hong Kong

Coordinates: 22.3979°N 113.9237°E

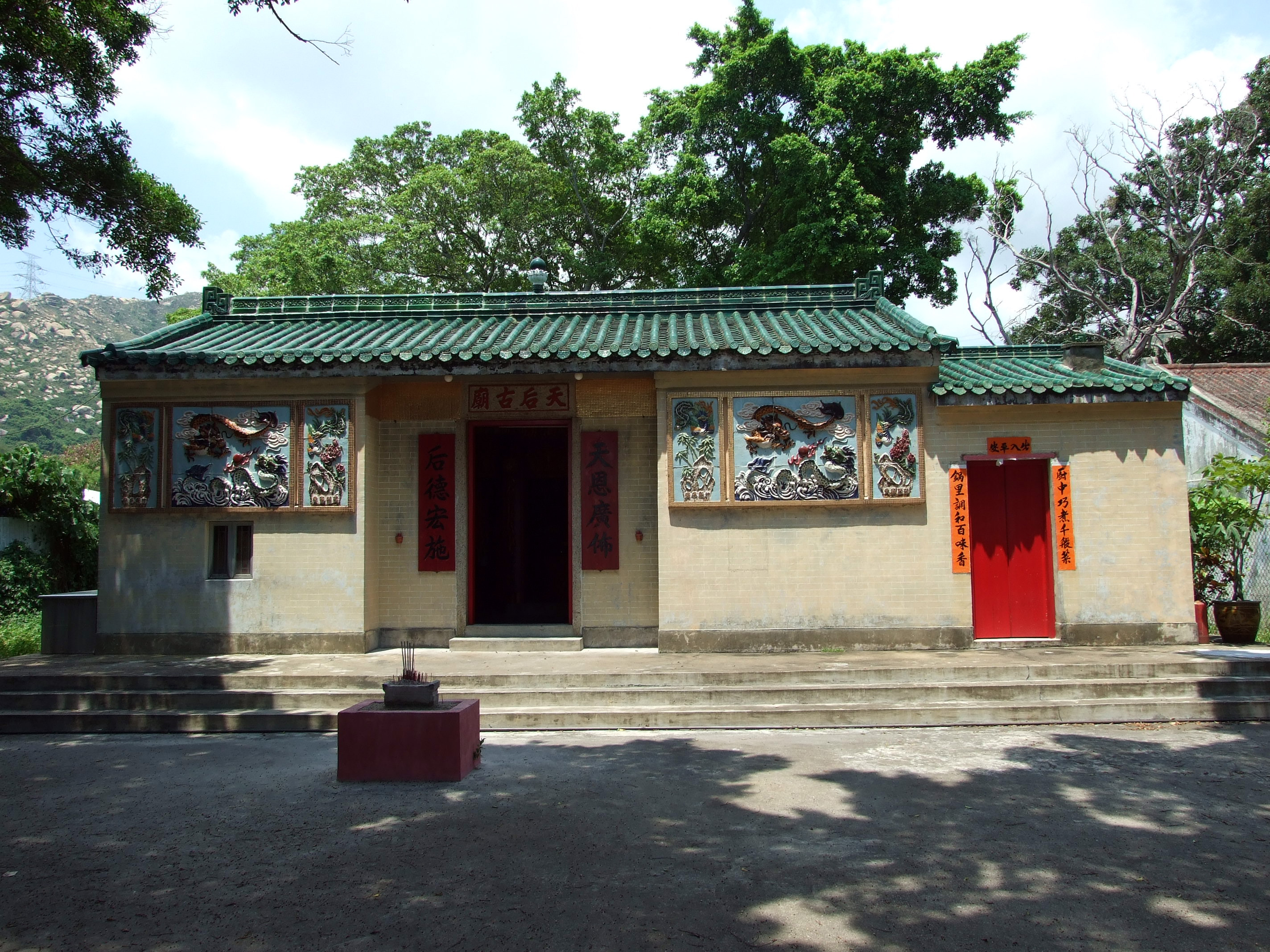
Tin Hau Temple at Pak Long, Lung Kwu Tan in July 2009.

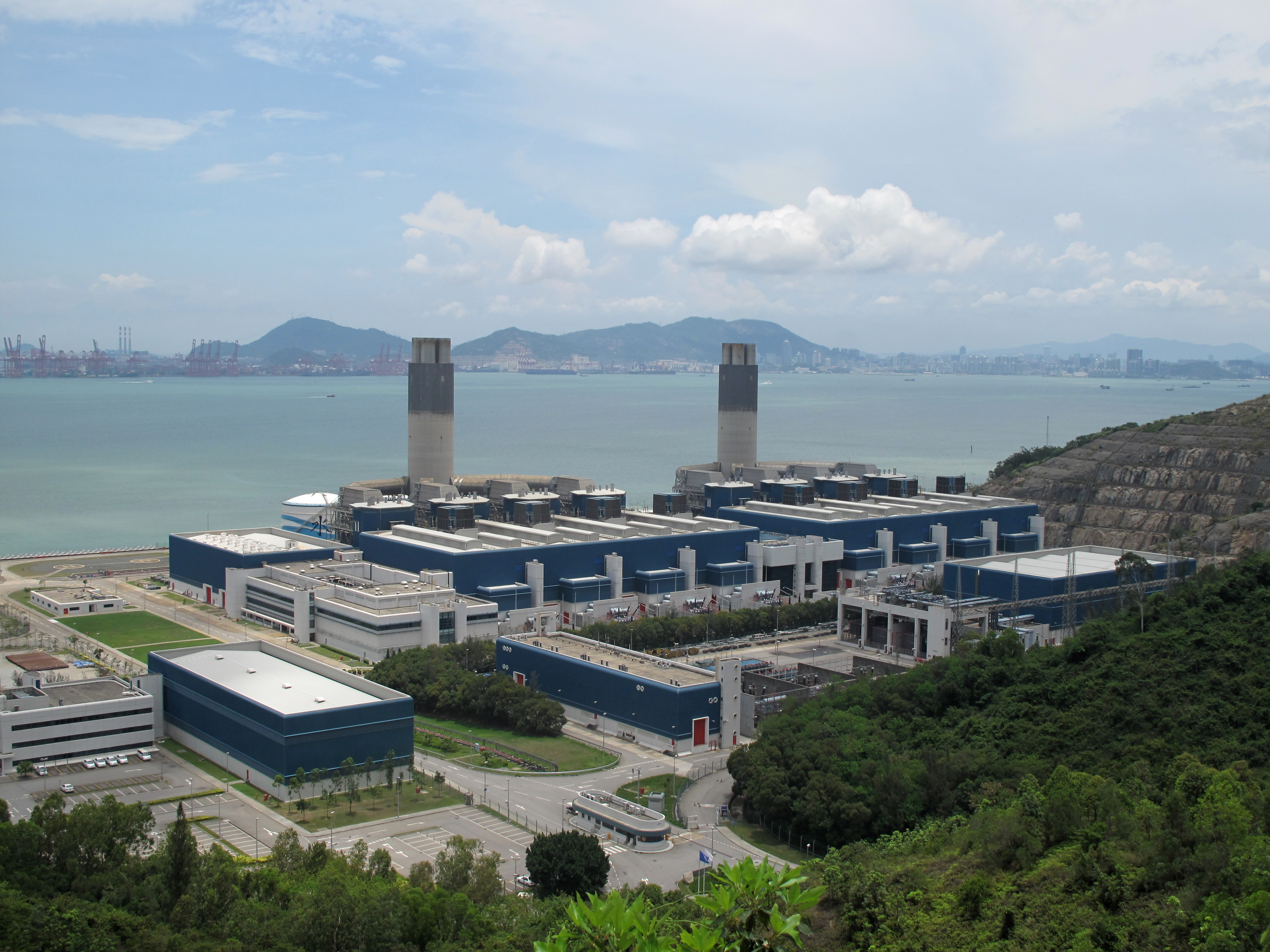
Black Point Power Station in Lung Kwu Tan.

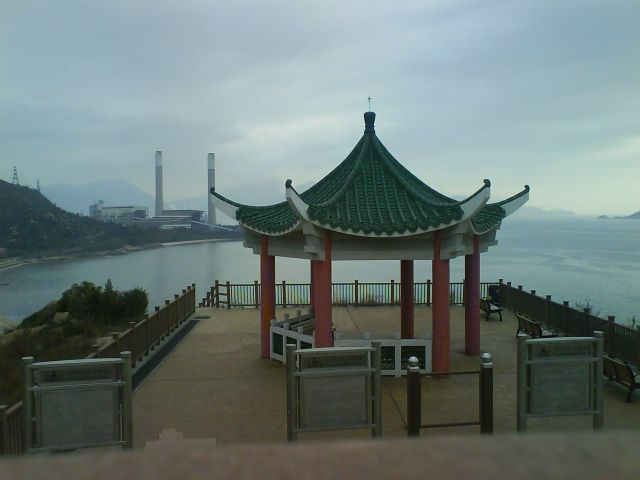
Lung Kwu Tan Chinese White Dolphin Lookout with Castle Peak Power Station in the background in February 2007.

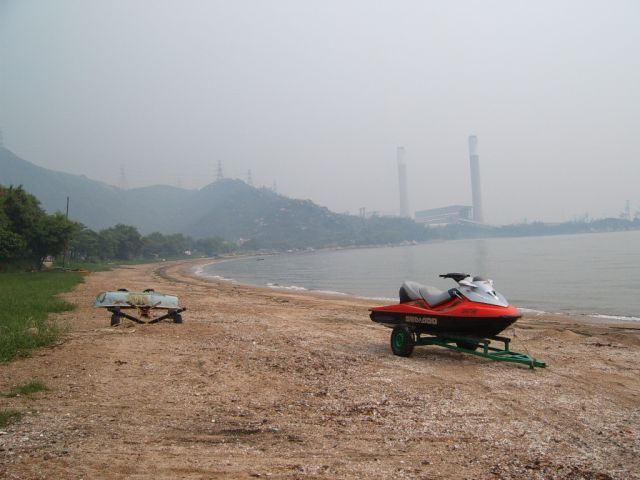
Beach at Lung Kwu Tan in August 2004.

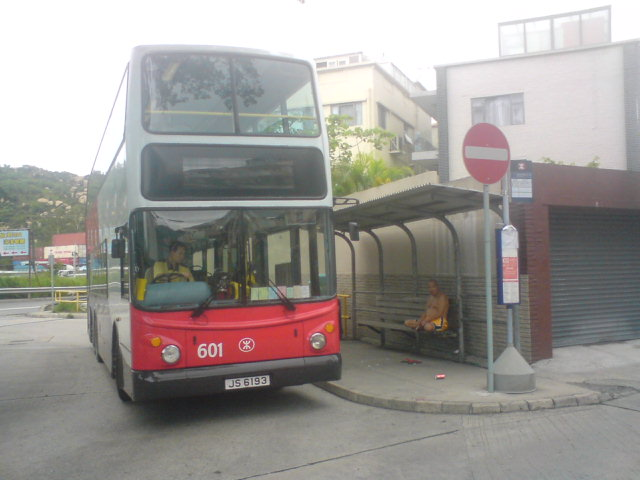
Lung Kwu Tan Bus Terminus in June 2010

Lung Kwu Tan (Chinese: 龍鼓灘) is an area located in the western part of the Tuen Mun District in Hong Kong.

== Geography ==
The area is located to the southwest of Castle Peak and consists of Lung Kwu Tan and Lung Kwu Sheung Tan. Lung Kwu Tan is a beach with black sand.

== Administration ==
Lung Kwu Tan Village is a recognized village under the New Territories Small House Policy. It is one of the 36 villages represented within the Tuen Mun Rural Committee. Lung Kwu Tan Village Representative Lau Wong-fat was the chairman of the Heung Yee Kuk in 1980–2015 and an influential figure in rural Hong Kong politics.

== History ==
Lung Kwu Tan Village has a history of a few hundred years.

In 2021, police in the area seized 10 speedboats and a record 57 engines, both used for illegal smuggling, in a 100,000 sqft warehouse belonging to a company owned by Kenneth Lau and his family.

== Features ==
Visitors attractions in Lung Kwu Tan include the local Tin Hau Temple at Pak Long (北朗) and Bogy's Rock. While Lung Kwu Tan is a place of primitive simplicity, the opening of privately run barbecue sites have always drawn crowds of holidaymakers. Rare, endangered Chinese white dolphins can be observed from shores.

The Lau Ancestral Hall in Tuk Mei Chung (篤尾涌) village, part of Lung Kwu Tan, is a Grade III historic building.

=== The Emperor's Cave ===
It is said that Emperor Bing of Song (1271–1279) of the Southern Song dynasty went south as far as Lung Kwu Tan as he fled from the invading Mongols in the north. There is a cave at Lung Kwu Tan, which became known as the Emperor's Cave and is believed to be where Emperor Bing took refuge during his stay. During the period of Japanese occupation, the Dong Jiang guerrilla force made the cave one of its military bases to put up resistance against the Japanese.

== Transportation ==
The village is connected to the LRT via route Nos 507, 610, 614, 614P, 615 and 615P which in turn connect to the Tuen Mun Ferry Pier stop via MTR Bus route No. K52.

== Education ==
Lung Kwu Tan is in Primary One Admission (POA) School Net 70. Within the school net are multiple aided schools (operated independently but funded with government money) and the following government schools: Tuen Mun Government Primary School (屯門官立小學).

== See also ==
- Tuen Mun Rural Committee
- Black Point Power Station
