= Cheung Yan-lung =

Hong Kong businessman and politician (1922–2021)

Benton Cheung Yan-lung CBE OStJ JP
- 張人龍

Member of the Legislative Council
- In office 7 October 1981 – 22 August 1991
- Preceded by: Lau Wong-fat
- Succeeded by: Gilbert Leung
- Constituency: Regional Council

Chairman of the Regional Council
- In office 1986–1995
- Preceded by: New title
- Succeeded by: Daniel Lam

Chairman of the Heung Yee Kuk
- In office 1964–1966
- Preceded by: Chan Yat-sen
- Succeeded by: Pang Fu-wa

Personal details
- Born: 18 April 1922 New Territories, North District, British Hong Kong
- Died: 19 September 2021 (aged 99) Hong Kong
- Spouse(s): Angela Liu Fung-wo; Dolly Chan Shuk-ching; Hui Yuk-kau
- Children: Cheung Sing-chung; Cheung Heung-ping; Cheung Chun Sing; Cheung May Ping; Cheung Leung-sing; Cheung Yiu-sing; Cheung Lok-ching; Cheung Tak-Hay; Cheung Yuen-wa; Alexander Fu; Cheung Chin-pang; Cheung Leung-Kwan; Cheung Tak-kwai
- Parents: Cheung Chi-hang (father); Choi Siu-tai (mother)
- Education: La Salle College, Zhongshan University (BA)
- Occupation: Businessman

Cheung Yan-lung
- Traditional Chinese: 張人龍
- Simplified Chinese: 张人龙
Transcriptions
Standard Mandarin
- Hanyu Pinyin: Zhāng Rénlóng
Yue: Cantonese
- Jyutping: zoeng1 jan4 lung4

Benton Cheung Yan-lung, CBE, OStJ, JP (18 April 1922 – 19 September 2021) was a Hong Kong businessman and politician with New Territories rural background. He was a member of the Legislative Council of Hong Kong from 1981 to 1991 and chairman of the Regional Council of Hong Kong and New Territories Heung Yee Kuk.

== Biography ==
Cheung was born on 18 April 1922 in a New Territories village in the North District nearby the Hong Kong–China border to his father Cheung Chi-hang and his wife Choi Siu-tai. Having graduated from the La Salle College and with a degree in economics from the University of Dr. Sun Yat-sen in Canton, Cheung worked in his father's business in Hong Kong.

In 1964, he was selected by the rural committees as the 16th chairman of the Heung Yee Kuk, representing the indigenous inhabitants. He was also chairman of the North District Community Centre and Town Hall Management Committee.

Cheung was appointed to the Legislative Council of Hong Kong in 1981. In 1985, he became the chairman of the Regional Council (Provisional Regional Council up to 1986) which he held the position until 1995. He was also member of the North District Board. He held other public positions including member of North District Social Services Committee, St. John Council, Hong Kong Housing Authority and Fireworks Displays Vetting Committee. He was also director of the Hong Kong Future Exchange and Kowloon-Canton Railway Corporation.

He had three wives, the first being Angela Liu Fung-wo, while the second was Dolly Chan Shuk-ching, and the third was Hui Yuk-kau, with them he had 16 children. His ninth son, Alexander Fu (birth name Cheung Fu-sheng) was a famous kungfu movie star.

Cheung died on 19 September 2021, at the age of 99.
