= Lau Wong-fat =

Hong Kong politician (1936–2017)

Dr the Honourable Lau Wong-fat GBM GBS OBE JP
- 劉皇發
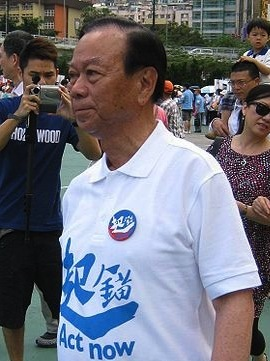

Non-official Member of the Executive Council
- In office 21 January 2009 – 30 June 2012
- Appointed by: Donald Tsang
- Succeeded by: Cheung Hok-ming

Member of the Legislative Council
- In office 30 October 1985 – 25 August 1988
- Preceded by: New constituency
- Succeeded by: Cheung Yan-lung
- Constituency: Regional Council
- In office 12 October 1988 – 22 August 1991
- Appointed by: Sir David Wilson
- In office 9 October 1991 – 30 June 1997
- Preceded by: New constituency
- Succeeded by: Council abolished
- Constituency: Rural
- In office 22 February 1997 – 8 April 1998 (Provisional Legislative Council)
- In office 1 July 1998 – 30 September 2004
- Preceded by: New parliament
- Succeeded by: Lam Wai-keung
- Constituency: Heung Yee Kuk
- In office 1 October 2004 – 30 September 2008
- Preceded by: Ip Kwok-him
- Succeeded by: Ip Kwok-him
- Constituency: District Council
- In office 1 October 2008 – 30 September 2016
- Preceded by: Lam Wai-keung
- Succeeded by: Kenneth Lau
- Constituency: Heung Yee Kuk

Chairman of the Regional Council
- In office 1 April 1995 – 31 December 1999
- Preceded by: Lam Wai-keung
- Succeeded by: Council abolished

Chairman of the Heung Yee Kuk
- In office 1 June 1980 – 31 May 2015
- Preceded by: Wong Yuen-cheung
- Succeeded by: Kenneth Lau

Chairman of the Tuen Mun District Council
- In office 1985 – 1 April 2011
- Preceded by: Ricky C. C. Fung
- Succeeded by: Leung Kin-man
- In office 6 January 2012 – 31 December 2015
- Preceded by: Leung Kin-man
- Succeeded by: Leung Kin-man

Personal details
- Born: 15 October 1936 Lung Kwu Tan, Tuen Mun, British Hong Kong
- Died: 23 July 2017 (aged 80) Tuen Mun, Hong Kong
- Cause of death: Chronic condition
- Party: FSHK (1991–93); Liberal Party (1993–2008); Economic Synergy (2009–12); BPA (2012–17)
- Spouse: Lau Ng Mui-chu
- Children: Kenneth Lau
- Education: Ling Shan College
- Occupation: Politician and businessman

Lau Wong-fat
- Traditional Chinese: 劉皇發
- Simplified Chinese: 刘皇发
Transcriptions
Standard Mandarin
- Hanyu Pinyin: Liú Huáng fā
Yue: Cantonese
- Yale Romanization: Làuh Wòhng faat
- Jyutping: Lau^{4} Wong^{4} faat^{3}

Lau Wong-fat, GBM, GBS, OBE, JP (Chinese: 劉皇發; 15 October 1936 – 23 July 2017) was a Hong Kong businessman and politician. He had been the long-time chairman of the Rural Council, the most powerful organ representing the interests of the New Territories indigenous inhabitants from 1980 to 2015. He was also a member of the Legislative Council of Hong Kong from 1985 to 2016. From 2009 to 2012 he was a non-official member of the Executive Council of Hong Kong. He had also served as the member of the Chinese People's Political Consultative Conference and chairman of the Regional Council and the Tuen Mun District Council.

He began to involve in New Territories rural politics as a village representative in the Tuen Mun Rural Committee and climbed to the head of the villagers as the chairman of Heung Yee Kuk in 1980, where he kept the position for 35 years until he passed it on to his son, Kenneth Lau. He was appointed member of the Hong Kong Basic Law Drafting Committee and played an instrumental role in ensuring rural interests in the drafting of the Basic Law of Hong Kong. He was first indirectly elected to the Legislative Council through the Regional Council functional constituency in 1986 and he held his seat through Heung Yee Kuk constituency from 1991 to 2004 and from 2008 until 2016 when he was replaced by his son. From 2004 to 2008 he was indirectly elected through the District Council constituency. He was also the chairman of the Tuen Mun District Council from 1985 to 2011 and the chairman of the Regional Council from 1995 to 1999.

In 2009, he was appointed by Chief Executive Donald Tsang to the Executive Council, the highest advisory council of the Hong Kong government where he served until 2012. For this, together with his extensive ownership of land and property, he was known as the "King of the New Territories" (新界王) or the "Land Emperor of the New Territories" (新界土皇帝). He died in 2017 at the age of 80.

== Early life and rural politics ==
Lau was born in the village of Lung Kwu Tan, Tuen Mun, New Territories in 1936. At the age of 22, Lau was selected by local villagers at the Lung Kwu Tan Village to be a representative of Tuen Mun, the youngest ever village leader. He became chairman of the Tuen Mun Rural Committee in 1970 under the tutelage of chairman of the Heung Yee Kuk Chan Yat-sen, a position he held for 41 years, until in April 2011 the committee amended its constitution to limit any chairman to no more than two four-year terms. However, he was re-elected as chairman of the rural committee in 2015.

His longstanding membership of the rural committee was as village representative for Lung Kwu Tan. For many years unopposed, in January 2011, he faced the village's approximately 600 voters, after a challenge following the controversy of his failure to disclose some of his property holdings. He and his ally won comfortably, with even the defeated young candidates claiming "I just want to learn things from Fat Shuk [Uncle Fat]."

As the rural committee chairman, Lau was automatically an ex-officio member of Tuen Mun District Council, and became its chairman in 1985. He briefly lost this position in April 2011 with his ousting from leadership of the rural committee by another pro-Beijing politician Junius Ho. After failing to win a seat in the 2011 District Council elections, and against protests by rural committee members and local villagers, he was directly appointed back to the council by Chief Executive Donald Tsang, and on 4 January 2012 was elected by District Councillors back into the post of council chairman. He held the chairmanship of the Tuen Mun District Council again from 2015 to 2016 until he retired from the rural committee.

== Heung Yee Kuk chairman ==
In 1980 Lau became the chairman of the Heung Yee Kuk, which represented established interests of all inhabitants in the New Territories. He held the position for 35 years and was elected for nine terms. By the powerful nature of the Kuk he became a high flyer in the Hong Kong politics. In May 2015, he stepped down as chairman and was succeeded by his son, Kenneth Lau.

The Melhado Investment Ltd in which Lau was a major shareholder sued the government in the early 1980s for its non-agricultural use of land in the New Territories. In 1983, the Court of Appeal ruled in favour of the Melhado. The Melhado case thus became the beginning of widespread use of land in the New Territories for the open storage of containers.

In the capacity of the Kuk chairman, Lau was invited to be a guest at the signing of the Sino-British Joint Declaration on 19 December 1984 in Beijing. In 1985, he was appointed to the Hong Kong Basic Law Drafting Committee by the Beijing government, which was responsible for drafting the mini-constitution of Hong Kong in 1997, where he played an instrumental role in the insertion of the Article 40 in the Basic Law to ensure indigenous interests remained protected after Hong Kong's handover to Chinese sovereignty in 1997. He was a member of the Chinese People's Political Consultative Conference from 1993 to 2003. He was also appointed Hong Kong Affairs Advisors and Preparatory Committee for the Hong Kong Special Administrative Region by Beijing ahead of the handover of Hong Kong.

In 1986 Lau also became a member of the Regional Council where he became the chairman of the council from 1995 to 1997 and the chairman of the Provisional Regional Council from 1997 to 1999 until the Regional Council and the Urban Council were abolished in 2000.

== Legislative councillor ==
Lau first became a member of the Legislative Council of Hong Kong in 1985 after the creation of the newly created functional constituency Regional Council where he was elected by the members of the council. He did not stand for the 1988 re-election but was appointed by Governor David Wilson instead. In 1991, a Rural functional constituency was created where members of the Heung Yee Kuk elected its own Legislative Council representative. Lau was uncontestedly elected six times with a brief interruption from 2004 and 2008 where he stood in the District Council functional constituency as the incumbent pro-Beijing legislator Ip Kwok-him of the Democratic Alliance for the Betterment of Hong Kong (DAB) lost his District Council seat and therefore ineligible to run.

He was the founding member of the Co-operative Resources Centre, a conservative political group led by Senior Unofficial Member Allen Lee in 1991 to counter the liberal emergence of the United Democrats of Hong Kong in the Legislative Council after the 1991 direct election. The group later transformed itself into the Liberal Party where Lau was a member until he quit the party in 2008. In the 2008 Legislative Council election, Liberal Party chairwoman Selina Chow accused Lau for campaigning for DAB candidate Cheung Hok-ming, the Kuk vice-chairman, who ran in the same constituency which caused her defeat. As a result, Lau quit the party with Andrew Leung, Jeffrey Lam and Sophia Leung, which made the number of the Liberal Party's seats drop from seven to three. The split members later formed the Economic Synergy in 2009 which later merged with the Professional Forum into the Business and Professionals Alliance for Hong Kong (BPA) where Lau was the honorary chairman.

In January 2009, Lau was appointed to the Executive Council of Hong Kong by Chief Executive Donald Tsang, where he held the position until 2012.

Lau's performance in Legco was considered one of the worst as he had not initiated a motion since 1998. His only motion was on 4 December 2013 against the incorporation of Tai Long Sai Wan into Country Park but was defeated. In 2009 and 2010, Lau supported the disputed HK$66.9 billion funding of Express Rail, and advocated the controversial reform of methods for selecting the CE and LegCo. In 2014, Lau was awarded top position in the no-show charts in his participation of the Legislative Council. His attendance rate at work had stirred up concern that he was actually deceased given his age. From 2004 to 2016, he was the oldest member in the Legislative Council.

He was at the centre of the declaration-of-interest scandal in 2010. However, Legco ultimately refrained from investigating Lau, for reasons that were never made public. This had caused some people believe that there was collusion between Lau and the government for mutual gain.

He was also at the centre of the controversy in the pro-Beijing walkout ahead of the voting on the Methods for Selecting the Chief Executive in 2017 and for Forming the LegCo in 2016 as the pro-Beijing legislators launched walkout was an impromptu attempt to delay the division so that Lau, who was delayed, could cast his vote in favour of the Beijing-backed reforms. The strategy backfired and the government's reform proposal failed as eight legislators voted in favour and 28 voted against, barely meeting the quorum of 35.

== Controversies ==
=== Property disclosure incident ===
In October 2010, Lau was publicly criticised for his purchase of 19 properties in Yuen Long through companies linked to him after he failed to disclose at least some of the acquisitions to the council within the required 14 days. In a span of 10 days he revised his declared total ownership of land three times, bringing further criticism from leading figures such as Legco House Committee chairwoman Miriam Lau and deputy chairwoman of Legco's Committee on Members' Interests Emily Lau. His portfolio was later revealed to contain a large amount of land in Hong Kong with 724 plots of land and he was described as "a huge landlord" by Miriam Lau.

Plots of land owned	Location
521 plots	Tuen Mun
122 plots	North District
33 plots	Yuen Long
4 plots	Islands near Hong Kong
2 plots	Tai Po
2 plots	Mainland China

Together with his family and through various companies, he owns 40 commercial and residential properties including houses and flats. Prior to October 2010 he registered only 337 plots of land. He failed to declare the purchases of three houses in Yuen Long in April and 16 flats in Yoho Midtown through Carofaith Investment, in which he holds 40% stake. Another company controlled by his son Kenneth Lau and Lau's daughter-in-law also bought eight flats in Yoho. His son sold three of them making a profit of HK$800,000 at a time when the government was trying to cool real estate property prices in 2010.

=== Litigation ===
In June 2012, the Hong Kong press reported that an indigenous inhabitant of the indigenous village known as San Tin Village in Yuen Long of the New Territories of Hong Kong by the name of Man Yuk Moon (文玉滿) had commenced civil proceedings (HCA 1012 / 2012) against Mr Lau Wong Fat at the High Court of Hong Kong, claiming HK$5,870,000. According to the local press, Mr. Lau Wong Fat refused to comment on the issue when asked. He merely stated that the litigation had been passed to his lawyers for their further handling. The current status of this lawsuit is unclear.

== Retirement and personal life ==
Amid deteriorating health condition, Lau did not seek re-election as the chairman of the Heung Yee Kuk in May 2015, and was succeeded by his son Kenneth Lau. In January 2016, he was absent from the election of the chairman of the Tuen Mun District Council. The council elected DAB's Leung Kin-man as the new chairman. On 22 February 2016, he resigned as the chairman of the Tuen Mun Rural Committee and thus lost the ex-officio membership of the district council and was succeeded by his son Kenneth Lau. He had already been absent from the Legislative Council occasionally before he gave up standing in the 2016 re-election. His seat in the Heung Yee Kuk functional constituency was succeeded by his son Kenneth Lau.

Lau's self-declared educational record was that he attended Ling Shan College but the identity of this institution is not clear. His business holdings are centred on his chairmanship of Wing Tung Yick (Holdings) Ltd.

He was married to Ng Mui-chu, and had five children including Kenneth Lau. His sister married Kingsley Sit, also a rural leader and former member of the Legislative Council. He died on 23 July 2017 at the age of 80 after a long illness.

== Other positions, awards and recognition ==
In 1977, a new school was named after him: Lau Wong Fat Secondary School in Kowloon. In 1983, he succeeded Tang Yuek Fan as chairman of the New Territories Heung Yee Kuk Yuen Long District Secondary School. He was also an honorary court member of the Hong Kong University of Science and Technology. He also received an honorary doctoral degree from the China University of Political Science and Law in 2012.

Wong Chu Road, a major thoroughfare in Tuen Mun New Town linking Tuen Mun Road and the western part of the town, was named after him and his wife, Lau Ng Mui-chu. Castle Peak Estate, the first public housing estate in Tuen Mun, was renamed San Fat Estate after him and Chan Yat-sen, another prominent figure in the Kuk.

From 2004 to 2015 he had represented Hong Kong to perform the Lunar New year kau cim ceremony, succeeding Patrick Ho in the role.

He was made Justice of the Peace in 1973. In 1981, he was awarded Member of the Order of the British Empire (MBE) and the Officer of the Order of the British Empire (OBE) in 1989. In 1998, he was awarded Gold Bauhinia Star (GBS) and in 2005 he received the Grand Bauhinia Medal, Hong Kong's highest honour.

== See also ==
- Small House Policy
- Waiting for Uncle Fat

Political offices
Preceded by Chan Yat-sen	Chairman of Tuen Mun Rural Committee; 1970–2011	Succeeded by Junius Ho
Preceded by Wong Yuen-cheung	Chairman of Heung Yee Kuk; 1980–2015	Succeeded by Kenneth Lau
Preceded by Ricky Fung	Chairman of Tuen Mun District Council; 1985–2011	Succeeded by Leung Kin-man
Preceded by Daniel Lam	Chairman of Regional Council; 1995–1999	Council dissolved
New seat	Non-official Member of Executive Council; 2009–2012	Succeeded by Cheung Hok-ming
Preceded by Leung Kin-man	Chairman of Tuen Mun District Council; 2012–2015	Succeeded by Leung Kin-man
Preceded by Junius Ho	Chairman of Tuen Mun Rural Committee; 2015–2016	Succeeded by Kenneth Lau
Legislative Council of Hong Kong
New constituency	Member of Legislative Council; Representative for Regional Council; 1986–1988	Succeeded by Cheung Yan-lung
New constituency	Member of Legislative Council; Representative for Rural; 1991–1997	Replaced by Provisional Legislative Council
New parliament	Member of Provisional Legislative Council; 1997–1998	Replaced by Legislative Council
New parliament	Member of Legislative Council; Representative for Heung Yee Kuk; 1998–2004	Succeeded by Daniel Lam
Preceded by Ip Kwok-him	Member of Legislative Council; Representative for District Council; 2004–2008	Succeeded by Ip Kwok-him
Preceded by Daniel Lam	Member of Legislative Council; Representative for Heung Yee Kuk; 2008–2016	Succeeded by Kenneth Lau
