= The Loyalists =

The Loyalists may refer to:

- Loyalists, those showing allegiance to the British crown
- The Loyalists: An Historical Novel, an 1812 novel by Jane West
- Les Loyalistes, New Caledonian party coalition

== See also ==
- Loyalist (disambiguation)
