= Anti-Beijing camp =

The anti-Beijing camp may refer to:

- Pro-democracy camp (Hong Kong)
  - Localist camp
  - Pro-ROC camp
- Pro-democracy camp (Macau)
- Pro-Taiwan camp (disambiguation)
  - Pan-Green Coalition
- Anti–People's Republic of China sentiment

== See also ==
- Pro-Beijing camp (disambiguation)
