= Black Point Power Station =

Power plant in Tuen Mun, Hong Kong

Black Point Power Station 龍鼓灘發電廠
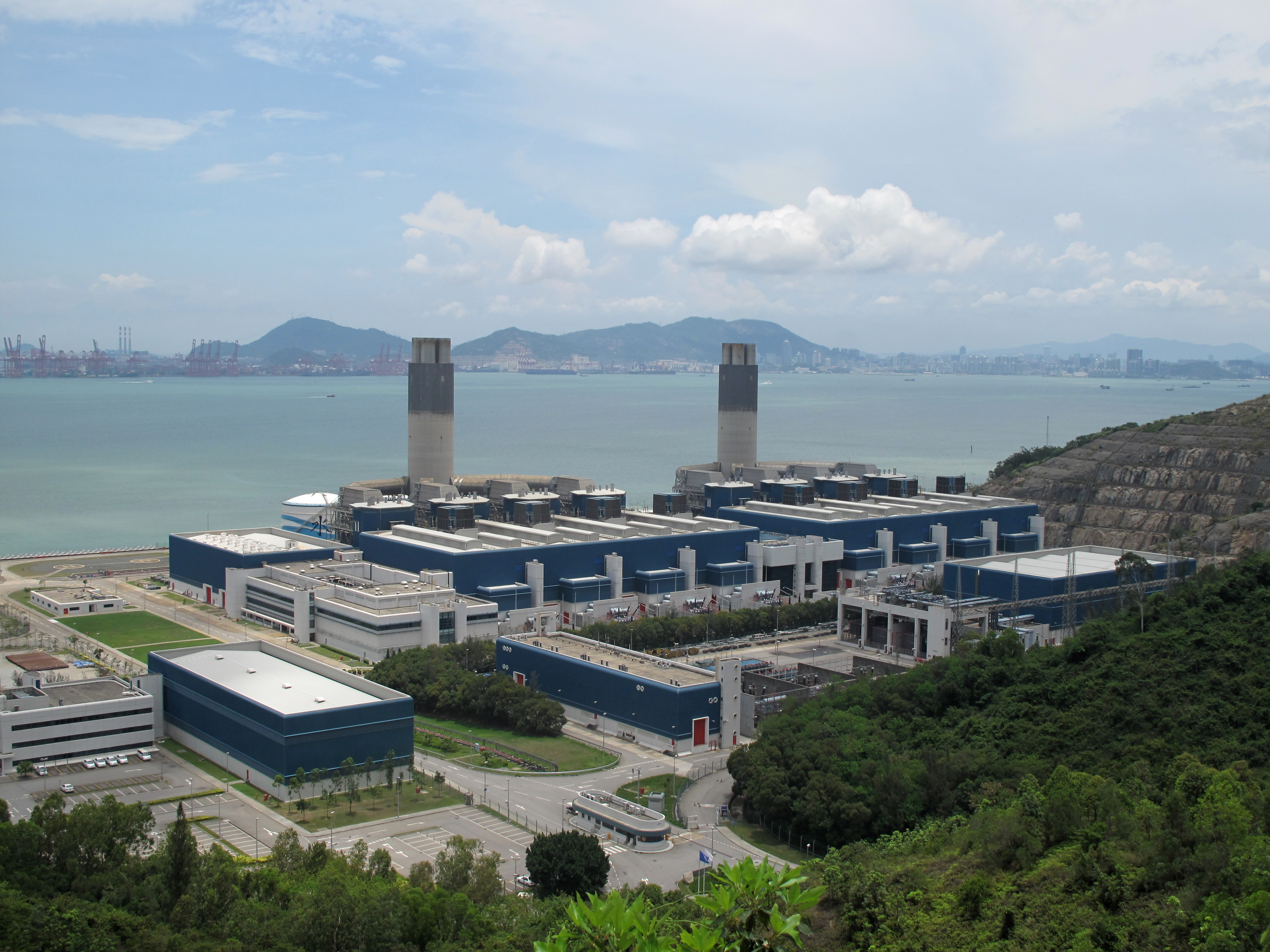
- Country: China
- Location: Lung Kwu Tan, Tuen Mun District, New Territories, Hong Kong
- Coordinates: 22°24′47″N 113°54′39″E
- Status: Operational
- Commission date: C1 - C8: 1996-2006; D1: 2020; D2: 2023 (under construction)
Owner
CLP Group	(70%)
China Southern Power Grid	(30%)

Thermal power station
- Primary fuel: Natural Gas
- Secondary fuel: Ultra-low-sulfur diesel
- Combined cycle?: Yes

Power generation
- Units operational: 8 × 337.5 MW; 1 × 550 MW
- Make and model: 8 × GE 9FA; 1 × Siemens SGT5-8000H
- Units under const.: 1 × 600 MW (2023)
- Nameplate capacity: 3250 MW

External links
- Commons: Related media on Commons

Black Point Power Station (Chinese: 龍鼓灘發電廠; Jyutping: lung4 gu2 taan1 faat3 din6 cong2) is a gas-fired power station in Lung Kwu Tan, New Territories, Hong Kong. The power station is operated by CLP Group.

== History ==
In the late 1980s, China Light and Power (CLP) examined several potential sites for the construction of a new power station. The company came to favour Fan Lau in southern Lantau Island, but this was rejected by the government for environmental reasons, particularly the effects the station would have on Lantau South Country Park. On 20 August 1990, the company announced that it had instead proposed to the government to build the station at Black Point.

The original eight GE 9FA combined cycle gas turbine (CCGT) units (C1 to C8) of the power station were commissioned in stages between 1996 and 2006. These 8 units have since been upgraded to 337.5 MW.

In 2017, CLP ordered a 550 MW Siemens SGT5-8000H CCGT unit (D1). This unit was completed and was operational mid-2020. A second CCGT unit (D2) with a capacity of 600 MW is expected to be operational by 2023.

== Operations ==
The station provides 3,225 MW of power. The complex consists of two halls with four turbines in each hall in C Station producing cleaner power when compared to coal. The last turbine was completed in 2006.

Since its commissioning, gas has been provided from the Yacheng offshore gas field, 750 km south of Hong Kong, in the South China Sea. CLP plans to increase usage of gas for its local generation when more gas becomes available, this change is in line with the Hong Kong Government's proposed enhancements to the Air Quality Objectives and Climate Change Strategy.

== Ownership ==
The station is owned by the Castle Peak Power Company Limited (CAPCO). CAPCO is 70 per cent owned by CLP Power Hong Kong Limited and 30 per cent by China Southern Power Grid International (HK) Co., Limited.

== See also ==
- Electricity sector in Hong Kong
- List of power stations in Hong Kong
