= Cheung Hok-ming =

Hong Kong politician

The Honourable Cheung Hok-ming GBM, GBS, JP
- 張學明
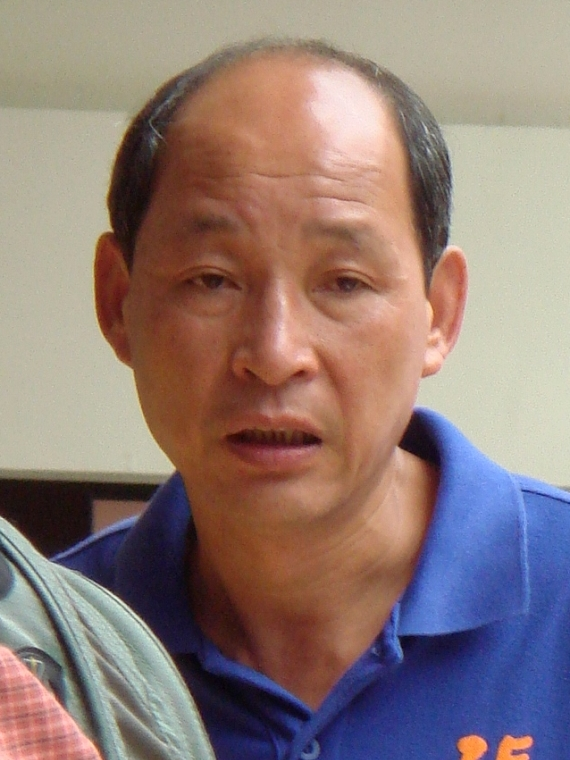

Non-official Member of the Executive Council of Hong Kong
- In office 1 July 2012 – 30 June 2017
- Appointed by: Leung Chun-ying
- Preceded by: Lau Wong-fat
- Succeeded by: Kenneth Lau

Chairman of the Tai Po District Council
- In office 10 January 2008 – 31 March 2019
- Preceded by: Cheng Chun-ping
- Succeeded by: Wong Pik-kiu
- In office 1994 – 31 December 2004
- Preceded by: Ho Yung-sang
- Succeeded by: Cheng Chun-ping

Member of the Legislative Council
- In office 1 October 2004 – 30 September 2008
- Preceded by: Tang Siu-tong
- Succeeded by: Chan Han-pan
- Constituency: New Territories West

Personal details
- Born: 3 July 1952 (age 74) Hong Kong
- Party: Democratic Alliance for the Betterment and Progress of Hong Kong

Cheung Hok-ming GBM GBS JP (simplified Chinese: 张学明; traditional Chinese: 張學明; pinyin: Zhāng Xuémín; born 3 July 1952, in Lam Tsuen, Tai Po, Hong Kong) is a former councillor in the Legislative Council of Hong Kong representing the New Territories West constituency. A Hakka, he is also the chairman of Tai Po District Council and the vice-chairman of Heung Yee Kuk. He is a member of The Democratic Alliance for the Betterment and Progress of Hong Kong party and supports pro-government policies.

Cheung is currently the chairman of the Tai Po Football Club.

Political offices
Preceded by Ho Yung-sang	Chairman of the Tai Po District Council; 1994–2004	Succeeded by Cheng Chun-ping
Preceded by Cheng Chun-ping	Chairman of the Tai Po District Council; 2008–2019	Succeeded by Wong Pik-kiu
Preceded by Lau Wong-fat	Non-official Member of Executive Council; 2012–2017	Succeeded by Kenneth Lau
Legislative Council of Hong Kong
Preceded by Tang Siu-tong	Member of Legislative Council; Representative for New Territories West; 2004–2012	Succeeded by Chan Han-pan
Order of precedence
Preceded by Lai Tung-kwok; Secretary for Security	Hong Kong order of precedence Non-official member of the Executive Council	Succeeded by Eddie Ng; Secretary for Education
