= Hong Kong Government Lunar New Year kau chim tradition =

Annual divination ritual

In each year's Chinese New Year celebrations in Hong Kong, a member of the Hong Kong Government represents the city in a divination ritual called kau chim. The event takes place on the second day of the Lunar New Year at Che Kung temple, Sha Tin, where a fortune stick is drawn. The luck of the city for that upcoming Lunar year will be foretold by the message on the fortune stick. The message is written in the form of classical Chinese poetry and is then interpreted by a Feng shui sifu or fortune teller.

== Tradition ==
The Hong Kong Government Lunar New Year kau chim tradition is an annual divination ritual associated with the Lunar New Year celebrations in Hong Kong. The tradition takes place on the second day of the Lunar New Year at Che Kung Temple in Sha Tin, where a representative draws a fortune stick on behalf of Hong Kong. The verse on the fortune stick is traditionally interpreted as an indication of the city's prospects for the coming year. Usually one stick is drawn for the fortune of the city by a main representative person. Other sticks may be drawn for smaller community divinations. There are five categories of stick fortunes, from good (上), to mid (中), to bad (下). Each level also has internal degrees. For example, stick #27 is unlucky. It relates to the story of Qin Shi Huang, first emperor of the Qin dynasty, who built the Great Wall of China and sparked widespread opposition among his people.

Che Kung Temple has a longstanding association with Lunar New Year worship in Hong Kong. The exact date of the temple's construction is unknown, but its earliest recorded renovation dates to 1890. According to the Hong Kong Heritage Museum, the temple is associated with Che Kung, a Southern Song general who was believed to have the ability to drive away plagues. The temple attracts large numbers of worshippers seeking blessings, particularly during the second and third days of the first lunar month.

== History and public role ==
The practice of drawing a fortune stick on behalf of Hong Kong dates back to at least the 1980s, when government officials or public officers participated in the Lunar New Year ritual at Che Kung Temple. The practice was initially conducted by officials from the colonial government and later continued after the 1997 handover. In 2003, then Secretary for Home Affairs Ho Chi-ping drew fortune stick No. 83, which was classified as an inauspicious fortune. The result attracted considerable public attention because it coincided with the outbreak of SARS and a period of political and social controversy in Hong Kong. From 2004 onward, the Hong Kong Government stopped appointing a government official to perform the ritual, and the chairman of the Heung Yee Kuk instead became the person who traditionally draws the fortune stick on behalf of Hong Kong. The ritual subsequently became a prominent Lunar New Year public event, with the interpretation of the fortune stick receiving coverage in Hong Kong media. The Chinese Temples Committee also identifies the second day of the Lunar New Year as the occasion when the Sha Tin Rural Committee conducts its annual kau chim ceremony at Che Kung Temple.

== Results ==
Year of the	Time frame	Stick drawer	Stick number	Result
Goat	15 Feb 1991; 3 Feb 1992			
Monkey	4 Feb 1992; 22 Jan 1993		27	Bad
Rooster	23 Jan 1993; 9 Feb 1994			
Dog	10 Feb 1994; 30 Jan 1995			
Pig	31 Jan 1995; 18 Feb 1996		61	
Rat	19 Feb 1996; 6 Feb 1997		70	
Ox	7 Feb 1997; 27 Jan 1998		81	
Tiger	28 Jan 1998; 15 Feb 1999		37	
Rabbit	16 Feb 1999; 4 Feb 2000	Lui Hau-tuen	34	
Dragon	5 Feb 2000; 23 Jan 2001	Lui Hau-tuen	91	
Snake	24 Jan 2001; 11 Feb 2002	Lui Hau-tuen	30	
Horse	12 Feb 2002; 31 Jan 2003	Lui Hau-tuen	38	
Goat	1 Feb 2003; 21 Jan 2004	Patrick Ho Chi-ping	83	Bad
Monkey	22 Jan 2004; 8 Feb 2005	Lau Wong-fat	76	Mid
Rooster	9 Feb 2005; 28 Jan 2006	Lau Wong-fat	53	Mid
Dog	29 Jan 2006; 17 Feb 2007	Lau Wong-fat	75	Good
Pig	18 Feb 2007; 6 Feb 2008	Lau Wong-fat	36	Mid
Rat	7 Feb 2008; 25 Jan 2009	Lau Wong-fat	60	Good
Ox	26 Jan 2009; 13 Feb 2010	Lau Wong-fat	27	Bad
Tiger	14 Feb 2010; 2 Feb 2011	Lau Wong-fat	53	Mid
Rabbit	3 Feb 2011; 22 Jan 2012	Lau Wong-fat	11	Mid
Dragon	23 Jan 2012; 09 Feb 2013	Lau Wong-fat	29	Mid
Snake	10 Feb 2013; 30 Jan 2014	Lau Wong-fat	95	Bad
Horse	31 Jan 2014; 18 Feb 2015	Lau Wong-fat	4	Mid
Goat	19 Feb 2015; 7 Feb 2016	Lau Wong-fat	20	Mid
Monkey	8 Feb 2016; 27 Jan 2017	Kenneth Lau	72	Good
Rooster	28 Jan 2017; 15 Feb 2018	Kenneth Lau	61	Mid
Dog	16 Feb 2018; 4 Feb 2019	Kenneth Lau	21/41	Mid
Pig	5 Feb 2019; 24 Jan 2020	Kenneth Lau	86	Mid
Rat	25 Jan 2020; 11 Feb 2021	Kenneth Lau	92	Mid

== See also ==
- Chinese spiritual world concepts
- Dajiao
- Jiaobei
- Tai Sui
- Timeline of Hong Kong history
- Tung Shing
