= Pro-Taiwan camp =

The pro-Taiwan camp may refer to:

- Pro-Taiwanese sentiment
- The "Pan-Green Coalition" in Taiwan (Republic of China); these are Taiwanese nationalists and the main opposition force against the "Pan-Blue Coalition" (which supports ROC nationalism).
- "Pro-ROC camp" (or "pro-Kuomintang camp") in Hong Kong
- "Localist camp" in Hong Kong; a political alignment among them with pro-Taiwanese sentiment
  - Democratic Progressive Party of Hong Kong

== See also ==
- Anti-Beijing camp (disambiguation)
- Pro-Beijing camp (disambiguation)
- Pro-democracy camp (disambiguation)
