= Loyalist (disambiguation) =

Loyalist may refer to:

== Politics ==
- Loyalist, a person who supports the British monarchy or the United Kingdom.
- Loyalist (American Civil War), an individual living in the Confederate States of America who remained loyal to the United States of America during the American Civil War. Also referred to as a Union Loyalist, Southern Loyalist, Lincoln Loyalist, and Southern Unionist.
- Loyalist (American Revolution), a British North American colonist who remained loyal to the British crown during the American Revolution.
- Loyalist (English Civil War), a term synonymous with Royalist or Cavaliers.
- Loyalist (Northern Ireland conflict), a person who supports the cause of Northern Ireland remaining part of the United Kingdom.
- The Loyalists in the Spanish Civil War, a supporter of the republican government, also known as Republicans.
- Loyalist Association of Workers, a militant Unionist organisation in Northern Ireland that sought to mobilize trade union members in support of the Loyalist cause.
- Loyalist Convention, a convention, called in advance of the mid-year elections of 1866, intended to bridge the gap between the Radical Republicans and the Reconstruction policies of U.S. President Andrew Johnson. Also known as the National Union Convention, the Southern Loyalist Convention, the National Loyalists' Loyal Union Convention, or the Arm-In-Arm Convention.
- Loyalist feud, any of the sporadic feuds which have erupted between Northern Ireland's various loyalist paramilitary groups since the late 1990s.
- Loyalist Volunteer Force, a paramilitary group in Northern Ireland.
- Beijing-loyalist, a person who supports of the Beijing government or the Chinese Communist Party (CCP).
- Gaddafi loyalist in the Libyan Civil War, a supporter of Muammar Gaddafi.

== Other uses ==
- HMS Loyalist (1779), a 14-gun sloop in Royal Navy service 1779-1781
- Loyalist College, an English-language community college in Belleville, Ontario, Canada.
- Loyalist Parkway, the section of Highway 33, in Southeastern Ontario, Canada, between Amherstview and Trenton.
- Loyalist, Ontario, a township in central eastern Ontario, Canada.

== See also ==
- Black Loyalist, a formerly enslaved African American or Free Negro who escaped to the British during the American Revolutionary War.
- Royalist, a person that supports a particular monarch or dynastic claim.
- Ulster loyalism, the ideology of those in Northern Ireland who believe in remaining part of the United Kingdom
- United Empire Loyalist, British Loyalists who resettled in British North America and other British Colonies.
