= Pro-democracy camp =

The pro-democracy camp or the pan-democracy camp may refer to:

- Pro-democracy camp (Hong Kong)
- Pro-democracy camp (Macau)

== See also ==
- Pro-Beijing camp (disambiguation)
- Pro-Taiwan camp (disambiguation)
