= Pro-China =

Pro-China may refer to:

- Political factions supporting the People's Republic of China:
  - Pro-Beijing camp (Hong Kong)
  - Pro-Beijing camp (Macau)
  - Pro-Beijing camp (Taiwan)
- Pro–Republic of China, politics supporting the Republic of China (Taiwan)
- Sinophile, someone expressing support for Chinese culture, people or history

== See also ==
- Chinese nationalism
- Pro-Beijing (disambiguation)
- Sinophobia, the opposite of Sinophilia
- Anti–People's Republic of China sentiment, the opposite of pro-China
