= Kenneth Lau =

Hong Kong politician

The Honourable Kenneth Lau Ip-keung SBS MH JP
- 劉業強
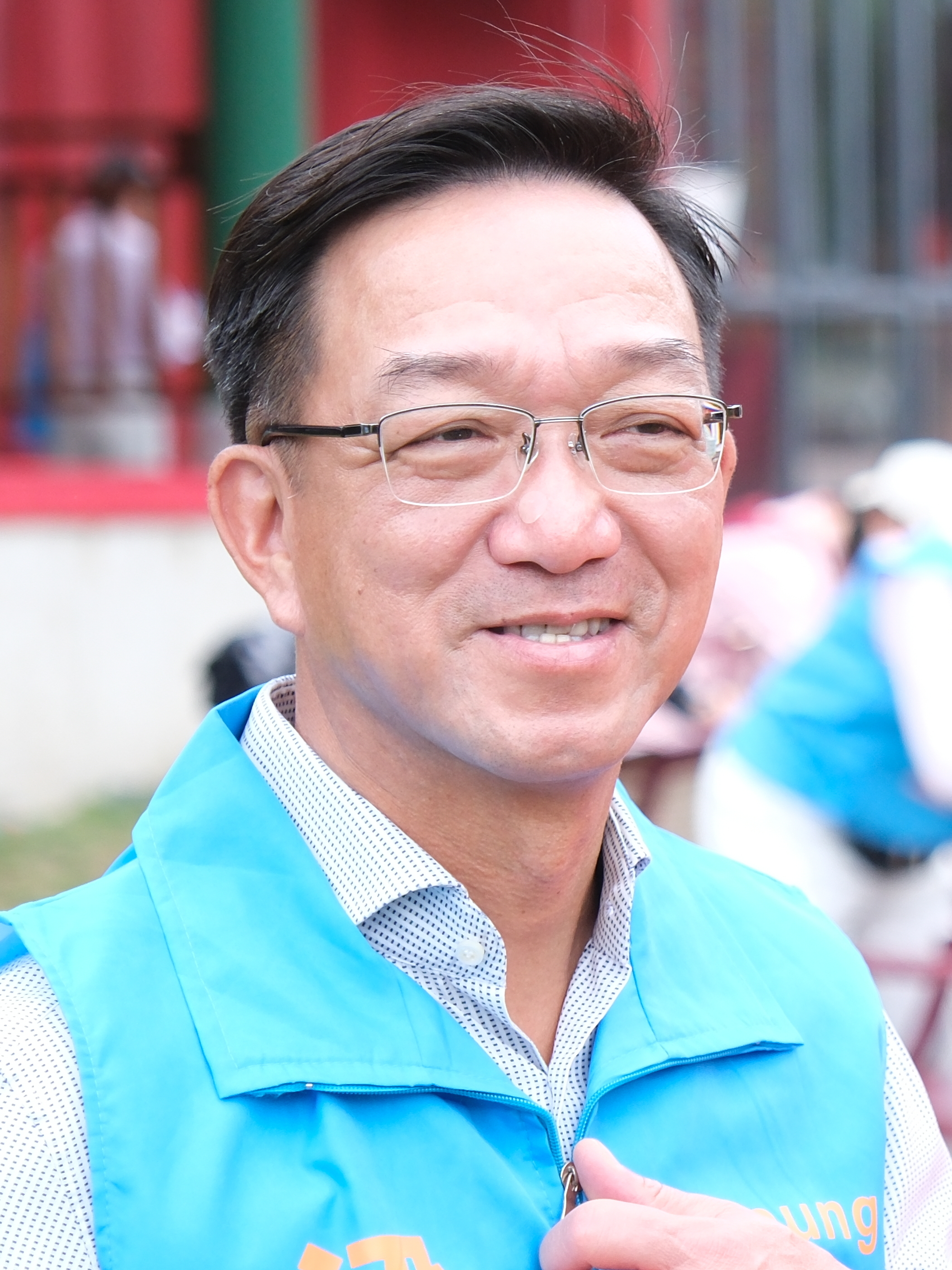
- Lau in 2023

Non-Official Member of Executive Council
- Incumbent
- Assumed office 1 July 2017
- Appointed by: Carrie Lam
- Preceded by: Cheung Hok-ming

Member of Legislative Council
- Incumbent
- Assumed office 1 October 2016
- Preceded by: Lau Wong-fat
- Constituency: Heung Yee Kuk

Chairman of Heung Yee Kuk
- Incumbent
- Assumed office 1 June 2015
- Preceded by: Lau Wong-fat

Member of Tuen Mun District Council
- In office 1 January 2000 – 1 April 2011
- Appointed by: Leung Chun-ying

Personal details
- Born: 1966 (age 59–60) British Hong Kong
- Party: Business and Professionals Alliance for Hong Kong
- Spouse: Judy Lau Yap Ai-ai
- Parent: Lau Wong-fat
- Education: London School of Economics (BS)
- Occupation: Businessman

Kenneth Lau Ip-keung
- Traditional Chinese: 劉業強
- Simplified Chinese: 刘业强
Transcriptions
Standard Mandarin
- Hanyu Pinyin: Liú Yèqiáng
Yue: Cantonese
- Jyutping: lau4 jip6 koeng4

Kenneth Lau Ip-keung BBS MH JP (Chinese: 劉業強, born 1966) is a New Territories rural leader in Hong Kong. He is the current chairman of the Heung Yee Kuk and member of the Legislative Council of Hong Kong for the Heung Yee Kuk functional constituency, succeeding his father Lau Wong-fat in 2015 and 2016 respectively. He has been an unofficial member of the Executive Council of Hong Kong since 2017. He was awarded the Silver Bauhinia Star by the Hong Kong SAR Government in 2023.

== Biography ==
Lau was born in 1966 to Lau Wong-fat, the powerful rural leader and the chairman of the Heung Yee Kuk for 35 years. He graduated from the London School of Economics in 1989 with a degree in mathematics and statistics. In May 2015, he was elected unchallenged to the Kuk chairmanship upon his father's retirement.

Lau was an appointed member of Tuen Mun District Council from 2000 to 2011. He was also a member of the government's Environmental Campaign Committee (2010–13).

Since 2006, he has been a member of the Election Committee, under the New Territories District Council Subsector from 2006 to 2011 and through Heung Yee Kuk since 2011.

Lau is a director of the Community Chest of Hong Kong. He and his wife, Judy Lau Yap Ai-ai, are members of the Hong Kong Jockey Club and horse owners.

Lau was revealed to be a British citizen by documents in the Panama Papers.

In the 2016 Hong Kong Legislative Council election, he succeeded his father to become a member of the Legislative Council in the Heung Yee Kuk functional constituency unopposed.

=== Property ===
According to his July 2020 declaration of interest, he owns more than 400 pieces of land throughout Hong Kong. In addition to the Hong Kong Jockey Club, the declaration lists him as a member of other organisations such as the Mission Hills Golf Club, Gold Coast Yacht and Country Club, and the Hong Kong Golf Club.

In 2021, police in Lung Kwu Tan seized 10 speedboats and a record 57 engines, both used for illegal smuggling, in a 100,000 sqft warehouse belonging to a company owned by Lau and his family.

According to Lau's January 2022 declaration of assets, he owns properties and land in Hong Kong, as well as land in Wuhan and Huizhou. He also declared shares in 105 companies, ranging from moneylending businesses to catering businesses.

In August 2022, his latest declaration of assets specified that he owns 456 plots of land in New Territories and 7 residential units in Tuen Mun for "self-use". He owns an additional 8 residential units in Hong Kong, for a total of 15 residential units, along with 5 commercial properties.

In August 2023, Lau's declaration of assets also showed he owned empty factory land in Hubei and Guangdong.

== Housing ==
=== Small House Policy ===
Lau is a supporter of the Small House Policy, and in January 2021, after the judiciary reinstated building rights for the Small House Policy, claimed "I heard some describe this as a 'big win' for us ... but the judgment is actually good for the whole of Hong Kong." Critics of the Small House Policy have said that the policy is "wasteful of land" that could instead be used for high rise developments. In February 2021, Lau said that the government hadn't fixed the housing supply issue in Hong Kong, and that "They can talk the talk, but they haven’t walked the talk," despite Lau's fighting for the Small House Policy, which takes up around 5,000 hectares of land in Hong Kong.

Lau has also said that overseas male descendants of indigenous villagers should be entitled to the small house policy even if they are not Hong Kong residents, and that "Despite them being overseas, we should not strip them of their rights."

=== Land reclamation ===
In October 2021, Lau said that villagers in Lung Kwu Tan in Tuen Mun would object to the government's land reclamation project near their homes, meant to create more land for the housing shortfall in Hong Kong.

=== San Tin Technopole ===
In August 2023, Sun Dong said that he had "suffered a lot of pressure" from Lau, over Lau's insistence to integrate villages into the San Tin Technopole plan.

=== Hong Kong Golf Club ===
In September 2023, after the government took back leased land from the Hong Kong Golf Club, Lau said he wished that the government would build housing elsewhere instead. Lau also said villagers living near the golf course had a "right" to play golf at the course for free, under an old agreement.

== Personal life ==
Lau is a member of the Hong Kong Jockey Club and in August 2022, was in an election to get seats on the board of stewards. According to an editorial by The Standard, Lau broke a tradition by participating in the election despite not being invited to do so. The editorial also mentioned that Lau winning or losing the election would reflect on if he had the "blessing of the government" and if the political clout of the Heung Yee Kuk was good enough. In September 2022, Lau placed dead last in the election, the only loser in a contest that saw 8 people on the ballot for 7 seats.

Political offices
Preceded by Lau Wong-fat	Chairman of Heung Yee Kuk; 2015–present	Incumbent
Legislative Council of Hong Kong
Preceded by Lau Wong-fat	Member of Legislative Council; Representative for Heung Yee Kuk; 2016–present	Incumbent
Preceded by Cheung Hok-ming	Non-official Member of Executive Council; 2017–present	Incumbent
Order of precedence
Preceded by Patrick Nip; Members of the Executive Council	Hong Kong order of precedence Members of the Executive Council	Succeeded by Horace Cheung; Members of the Executive Council
