= Economic Synergy =

Economic Synergy 經濟動力
- Founded: 16 June 2009
- Dissolved: October 2012
- Split from: Liberal Party
- Merged into: Business and Professionals Alliance
- Ideology: Conservatism (HK); Economic liberalism
- Regional affiliation: Pro-Beijing camp
- Colours: Blue
- Legislative Council: 0 / 90
- District Councils: 0 / 470

Website
- www.economicsynergy.org

Economic Synergy (also known as 3L) was a political party in Hong Kong, composed of three members of the Legislative Council, Andrew Leung, Jeffrey Lam and Lau Wong-fat.

== History ==
Formerly members of the Liberal Party, Jeffrey Lam, Andrew Leung and Sophie Leung resigned on 8 October 2008, saying they had not been able to communicate with the party, and were dissatisfied with its handling of the aftermath of its poor showing in the 2008 LegCo election. The three of them constituted half of the Liberal Party's representation in LegCo. Another Liberal Party Lau Wong-fat joined the group as a consultant soon after the group was set up, and therefore the group is sometimes referred to as the 4L.

In October 2012, the group formed the Business and Professionals Alliance for Hong Kong with other LegCo members from the pro-business sectors.

== Electoral performance ==
=== Legislative Council elections ===
Election	Number of popular votes	% of popular votes	GC seats	FC seats	Total seats	+/−
2012	5,717	0.32	0	3	3 / 70	1▼

=== District Councils elections ===
Election	Number of popular votes	% of popular votes	Total elected seats	+/−
2011	2,404	0.20	1 / 412	1▲
