= Business and Professionals Alliance for Hong Kong =

Political group in Hong Kong

Business and Professionals Alliance for Hong Kong 香港經濟民生聯盟
- Abbreviation: BPA
- Leader: Ng Wing-ka
- Chairman: Lo Wai-kwok
- Vice-Chairmen: Jeffrey Lam; Priscilla Leung; Kenneth Lau; Sunny Tan
- Founded: 7 October 2012; 14 years ago
- Merger of: Economic Synergy; Professional Forum
- Headquarters: 3204A, 32/F, Tower 1, Admiralty Centre, 18 Harcourt Road, Hong Kong
- Ideology: Conservatism (HK); Economic liberalism Chinese nationalism
- Political position: Centre-right to right-wing
- Regional affiliation: Pro-Beijing camp
- Colours: Blue and green
- Slogan: "Business Drives Economy, Professionalism; Improves Livelihood"
- Executive Council: 2 / 33
- Legislative Council: 8 / 90
- District Councils: 24 / 470
- NPC (HK deputies): 2 / 36
- CPPCC (HK members): 6 / 124

Website
- bpahk.org

Business and Professionals Alliance for Hong Kong
- Traditional Chinese: 香港經濟民生聯盟
- Simplified Chinese: 香港经济民生联盟
Transcriptions
Standard Mandarin
- Hanyu Pinyin: Xiānggǎng jīngjì mínshēng liánméng
Yue: Cantonese
- Yale Romanization: hēung góng gīng jai màhn sāng lyùhn màhng
- Jyutping: Hoeng^{1} gong^{2} Ging^{1} zai^{3} Man^{4} sang^{1} Lyun^{4} mang^{4}

The Business and Professionals Alliance for Hong Kong (BPA) is a pro-Beijing, pro-business political party in Hong Kong. Led by Ng Wing-ka and chaired by Lo Wai-kwok, the party is currently the second-largest party in the Legislative Council of Hong Kong, holding eight seats. It also has two representatives in the Executive Council and five seats in the District Councils.

The Alliance came into existence on 7 October 2012 after the 2012 Legislative Council election, as a rebranding of a loose pro-business parliamentary group including Economic Synergy and Professional Forum, as well as two other nonpartisan legislators who mostly came from trade-based functional constituencies consisting of Hong Kong's leading chambers of commerce or business sectors. Out of the seven founding legislators, the party's only directly elected representative was Priscilla Leung of Kowloon West.

The party immediately emerged as the second-largest party in the legislature, overtaking the Liberal Party who had an uneasy relationship with Beijing as the representative for the big business interests. It also slowly expanded its grassroots by absorbing Priscilla Leung's Kowloon West New Dynamic and won 10 seats in the 2015 District Council election. The Alliance retained its seven seats in the 2016 Legislative Council election which saw its party chairman Andrew Leung elected as the Legislative Council President.

== History ==
=== Founding ===
The Alliance was officially launched on 7 October 2012 on the basis of a loose political alliance under the same name on 21 August 2011, where 12 members of the Legislative Council from three pro-business groups, the Liberal Party, the Professional Forum, and the Economic Synergy joined together as a counter force to the pro-labour factions in the Legislative Council as well as the government. They fought over the Competition Bill subsequent to the Minimum Wage Bill with the support of powerful business unions and representative of small and medium-sized enterprises.

After the 2012 LegCo elections, members from the two members of the Professional Forum and three of the Economic Synergy with two other independent legislators officially formed the Alliance on 7 October 2012. Members were mostly supporters of Henry Tang, the former chief secretary who lost to Leung Chun-ying in the race in 2012 for the Chief Executive. The group consists of seven legislators which makes it the second largest political group in the Legislative Council, six of the seven members are from the functional constituencies. Unlike the grouping of the former legislature, the Liberal Party did not join the Alliance.

=== Development ===
During the 2015 Hong Kong electoral reform, Jeffrey Lam Kin-fung of the BPA and Ip Kwok-him of the Democratic Alliance for the Betterment and Progress of Hong Kong (DAB) led a walk-out of pro-Beijing legislators right before the historic vote on 18 June as an impromptu attempt to delay the division so that his party member Lau Wong-fat, who was delayed, could cast his vote in favour of the Beijing-backed reforms. The government's reform proposal failed as eight legislators voted in favour and 28 voted against, barely meeting the quorum of 35. Since it had been expected the reform would be voted down by 41-28 (which would fall only six votes short of the two-thirds absolute majority stipulated by the Basic Law), the failure in pro-Beijing camp's sudden tactics resulted in a surprising landslide defeat that gave the rest of the world the impression there was no support for the blueprint.

In the 2015 District Council election, the BPA won 10 seats in total. The alliance retained all seven seats in the 2016 Legislative Council election with the vice-chairman Jeffrey Lam narrowly defeated Liberal Party challenger Joseph Can Ho-lim in Commercial (First). After party chairman Andrew Leung was elected President of the Legislative Council, he resigned from as chairman post and was succeeded by Lo Wai-kwok. Leung was promoted as honorary chairman alongside Lau Wong-fat, while Lau's son, Kenneth Lau who took over his father seat in Heung Yee Kuk, was picked as the new vice-chairman.

In December 2018, legislator Ng Wing-ka of Industrial (Second) was invited to join the party, making the alliance the second largest party in the legislature with eight seats.

In February 2021, after Xia Baolong said that only "patriots" must govern Hong Kong, the BPA released a statement supporting Xia's position and that it looks forward to the changes. Additionally, the BPA claimed that Beijing is not trying to suppress antigovernmental voices.

== Leadership ==
=== Leader ===
- Ng Wing-ka, 2025–present

=== Chairmen ===
- Andrew Leung, 2012–2016
- Lo Wai-kwok, 2016–present

=== Vice-Chairmen ===
- Jeffrey Lam, 2012–present
- Christopher Cheung, 2012–2021
- Priscilla Leung, 2016–present
- Kenneth Lau, 2016–present
- Ng Wing-ka, 2018–2025
- Sunny Tan, 2025–present

=== Secretaries-General ===
- Abraham Shek, 2012–2025
- Benson Luk, 2025–present

=== Honorary Chairmen ===
- Lau Wong-fat, 2012–2017
- Andrew Leung, 2016–present

=== Council Chairmen ===
- Peter Lam, 2012–present

=== Council Vice-Chairmen ===
- David Lie, 2012–present

== Performance in elections ==
=== Legislative Council elections ===
Election	Number of popular votes	% of popular votes	GC seats	FC seats	EC seats	Total seats	+/−	Position
2016	49,745	2.29	1	6		7 / 70	0	2nd
2021	–	–	0	5	2	7 / 90	1▼	3rd▼
2025	38,602	3.02	0	6	2	8 / 90	1▲	2nd▲

=== District Council elections ===
Election	Number of popular votes	% of popular votes	D.E. seats	E.C. seats	App. seats	Ex off. seats	Total seats	+/−
2015	27,452	1.90	11			1	12 / 458	Steady
2019	66,504▲	2.27▲	3			2	5 / 479	7▼
2023	59,105▼	5.04▲	4	8	10	2	24 / 470	18▲

== Representatives ==
=== Executive Council ===
- Jeffrey Lam
- Kenneth Lau

=== Legislative Council ===
Constituency	Member
Industrial (First)	Ray WONG Wing-wai
Industrial (Second)	Ng Wing-ka
Commercial (First)	Jonathan Stuart LAMPORT
Heung Yee Kuk	Kenneth Lau
Engineering	Aaron BOK Kwok-ming
Textiles and Garment	Sunny Tan
Election Committee	Michelle TANG Ming-sum
Election Committee	Priscilla Leung

=== District Councils ===
The BPA holds 24 seats in 11 District Councils (2024–2027):

District	Constituency	Member
Eastern	Appointed	Kacee Ting Wong
Southern	District Committees	Adam Lai Ka-chi
Southern	District Committees	Howard Chao
Yau Tsim Mong	Yau Tsim Mong North	Li Sze-man
Yau Tsim Mong	District Committees	Wong Kin-san
Yau Tsim Mong	Appointed	Chan Siu-tong
Yau Tsim Mong	Appointed	Rowena Wong Siu-ming
Sham Shui Po	Sham Shui Po East	Chan Kwok-wai
Sham Shui Po	District Committee	Jeffrey Pong Chiu-fai
Sham Shui Po	Appointed	Aaron Lam Ka-fai
Kowloon City	Kowloon City South	Lee Chiu-yiu
Kowloon City	District Committee	Leung Yuen-ting
Kowloon City	Appointed	Steven Cho Wui-hung
Kowloon City	Appointed	He Huahan
Tuen Mun	Ex officio	Kenneth Lau Ip-keung
Yuen Long	Appointed	Chong Kin-shing
North	Appointed	Zinnie Chow Tin-yi
Tai Po	Tai Po South	Lo Hiu-fung
Tai Po	District Committees	Rex Li Wah-kwong
Tai Po	Appointed	Chan Cho-leung
Sha Tin	Ex officio	Mok Kam-kwai
Kwai Tsing	District Committees	Ariel Mok Yee-ki

== See also ==
- United Front Work Department
- United Front (China)
