= Daniel Lam =

Hong Kong politician

Daniel Lam Wai-keung
- 林偉強
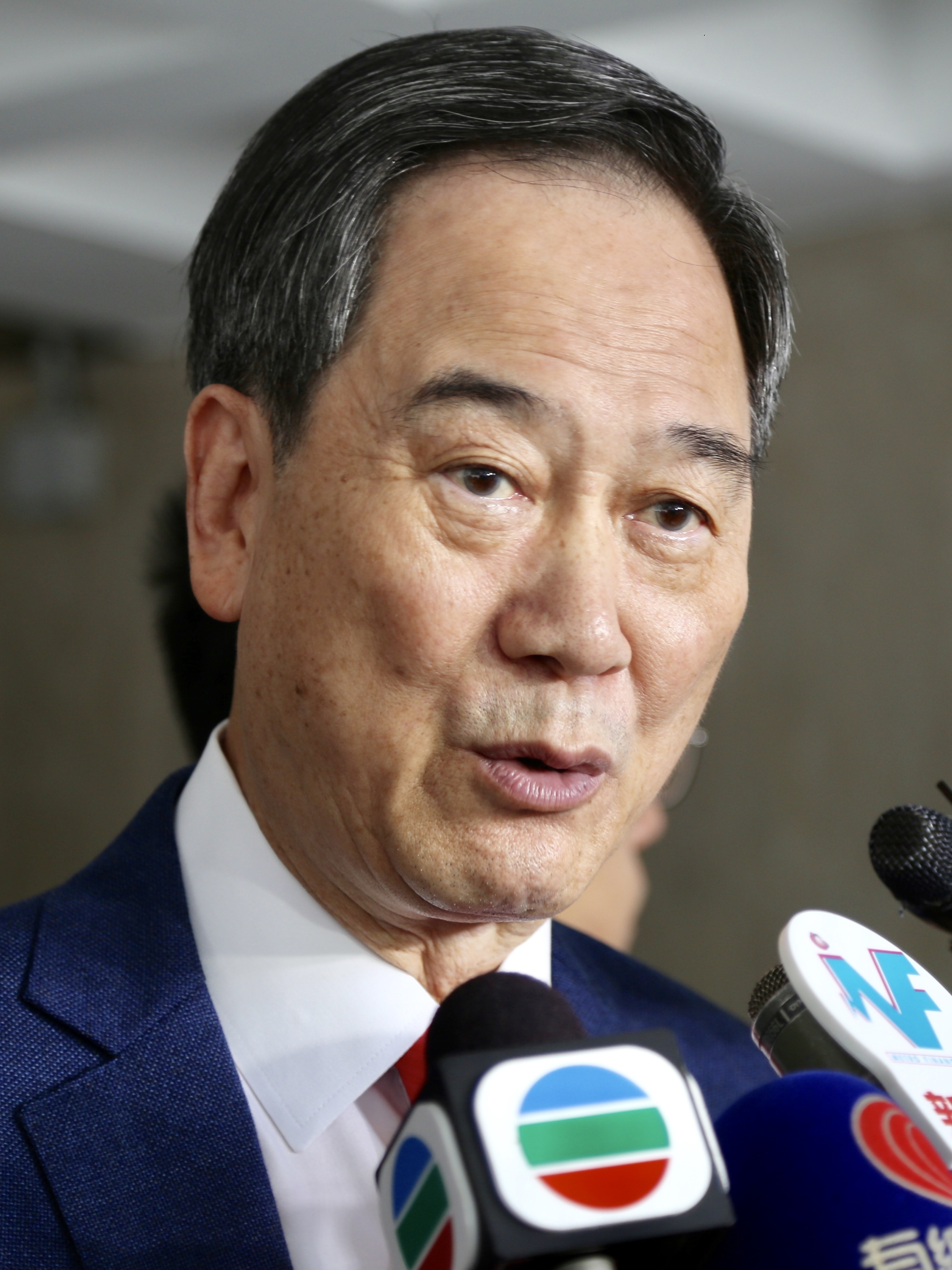
- Lam in 2019

Vice-chairman of Heung Yee Kuk
- Incumbent
- Assumed office 1 June 1991

Member of Legislative Council
- In office 1 October 2004 – 30 September 2008
- Preceded by: Lau Wong-fat
- Succeeded by: Lau Wong-fat
- Constituency: Heung Yee Kuk
- In office 12 October 1988 – 22 August 1991
- Constituency: South New Territories

Chairman of Regional Council
- In office 1 April 1995 – 30 June 1997
- Preceded by: Cheung Yan-lung
- Succeeded by: Lau Wong-fat

Chairman of Islands District Council
- In office April 1985 – 31 March 2011

Personal details
- Born: February 27, 1949 (age 77) Cheung Chau, New Territories, British Hong Kong

Daniel Lam Wai-keung
- Traditional Chinese: 林偉強
- Simplified Chinese: 林伟强
Transcriptions
Yue: Cantonese
- Yale Romanization: Làhm Wáih kèuhng
- Jyutping: Lam^{4} Wai^{5} koeng^{4}

Daniel Lam Wai-keung (Chinese: 林偉強) is the former chairman of the Hong Kong Regional Council as well as a former member of the Legislative Council of Hong Kong.

He is currently vice-chairman of the Heung Yee Kuk, an organisation representing indigenous inhabitants of the New Territories of Hong Kong, and was formerly chairman of Islands District Council. He was a member of Regional Council since 1991 and until the council's abolishment in 1999, and of Islands District Council between 1981 and 2011.

Political offices
Preceded by ???	Chairman of the Islands District Council; 1985–2011	Succeeded by Chow Yuk-tong
Preceded by Cheung Yan-lung	Chairman of Regional Council; 1991–1995	Succeeded by Lau Wong-fat
Legislative Council of Hong Kong
Preceded by Lau Wong-fat	Member of Legislative Council; Representative for Heung Yee Kuk constituency 2004–2008	Succeeded by Lau Wong-fat
