= Pro-Beijing camp =

The pro-Beijing camp may refer to:

- Pro-Beijing camp (Hong Kong)
- Pro-Beijing camp (Macau)
- Pro-Beijing camp (Taiwan)

== See also ==
- Anti-Beijing camp (disambiguation)
- Pro-democracy camp (disambiguation)
- Pro-Taiwan camp (disambiguation)
- United front (China)
  - United front in Hong Kong
  - United front in Taiwan
