= Jeffrey Lam =

Hong Kong politician (born 1951)

The Honourable Jeffrey Lam GBM, GBS, JP
- 林健鋒
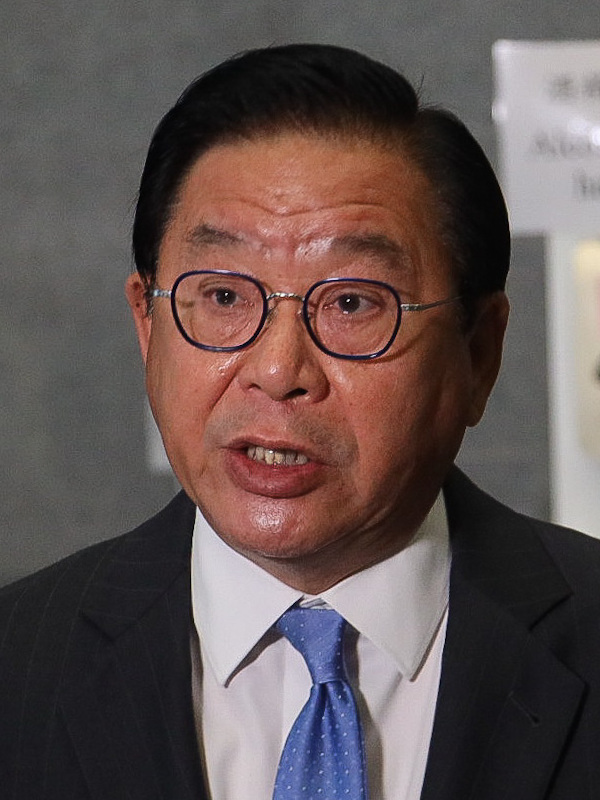
- Lam in 2023

Non-official Member of the Executive Council
- Incumbent
- Assumed office 17 October 2012
- Appointed by: Leung Chun-ying; Carrie Lam

Member of the Legislative Council
- In office 1 October 2004 – 31 December 2025
- Preceded by: James Tien
- Succeeded by: Jonathan Lamport
- Constituency: Commercial

Personal details
- Born: 23 October 1951 (age 74) British Hong Kong
- Party: BPA
- Other political affiliations: Liberal Party (quit 2008); Economic Synergy
- Spouse: Cynthia Lam
- Education: St. Joseph's College; Tufts University (BSME)
- Occupation: Managing director

Jeffrey Lam Kin-fung, GBM, GBS, JP (Chinese: 林健鋒; Cantonese Yale: Lam Gihn Fūng; born 23 October 1951) is a Hong Kong politician who served as non-official member of the Executive Council (Exco). He was previously a member of the Legislative Council (Legco), representing the Commercial (First) functional constituency, from 2004 to 2025.

== Education ==
Lam attended St. Joseph's College (class of 1969) and graduated in Mechanical Engineering from Tufts University in the United States.

== Career ==
He is managing director of Forward Winsome Industries, a toy manufacturer. He is also a General committee member of the Hong Kong General Chamber of Commerce and the Federation of Hong Kong Industries.

In the 2004 Legislative Council election, he represented the Liberal Party to run in the Commercial (First) functional constituency whose electors were the members of the Hong Kong General Chamber of Commerce, as incumbent James Tien, chairman of the Liberal Party, ran for direct election in the New Territories East. Lam has since held the seat.

As a long-term member of the Liberal Party, he was nominated to be party chairman following the resignation of James Tien after the latter's defeat in the 2008 Legislative Council election in September 2008.

In October 2012 after the Legislative Council election, Lam co-founded the pro-business Business and Professionals Alliance for Hong Kong (BPA) and became vice-chairman. On 17 October 2012, he was appointed non-official member of the Executive Council of Hong Kong by Chief Executive Leung Chun-ying.

In February 2022, Lam told SCMP that he would be attending the 2022 Two Sessions, as a Hong Kong delegate.

In November 2022, Lam went to Thailand and summarized his visit as clarifying that there is no more quarantine when arriving in Hong Kong, and that the city's brain drain is not as bad as someone had earlier thought.

Lam retired as member of the Legislative Council in 2025 amidst a massive wave of retirement.

== Controversies and views ==
In 2014, Lam had his licence suspended for six months for dangerous driving after he drove in the wrong lane at the junction of Wang Chiu Road and Cheung Yip Street in Kowloon Bay.

On 18 June 2015, Lam famously orchestrated the departure of the majority of the pro-Beijing Legislative Councillors from the legislative chamber just moments before votes were to be cast on the long-awaited Beijing-ordered Chief Executive election reform legislation which they intended to support. The legislation was voted down, 28 to 8. The few voting for were present only because Lam had failed to communicate the walkout to them effectively, and thereby contributed to the quorum required for the ballot to take place. Lam apologised and fought back tears. In a WhatsApp message circulated among pro-Beijing allies, Lam described Thursday as "the saddest day" of his 11 years in Legco. "I have learnt a very painful lesson", he said.

In February 2021, after Xia Baolong said that only "patriots" could govern Hong Kong and that electoral changes needed to be made, Lam supported the proposal and said that "I think whatever proposed is for the betterment of Hong Kong's society, the Hong Kong government, for the whole system... So we look forward to that. We hope that would come as soon as possible."

In March 2021, Lam supported changes to rules that would reduce the power of Legislative Council members, claiming that the opposition had abused the rules and delayed many bills from passing.

In August 2022, Lam repeated Regina Ip's opinion and said that public housing should not be built on the Fanling site of the Hong Kong Golf Club, though the development proposal was well-received by the public. A year later in August 2023, his declaration of interests showed that he was a member of the Hong Kong Golf Club.

In October 2022, after several US lawmakers warned US financial executives to not attend the Global Financial Leaders' Investment Summit, Lam said that the lawmakers were trying to "sabotage" the Summit.

== Awards ==
In 1996, Lam was appointed a Justice of Peace and awarded Member of the Order of the British Empire. In 2004 he received the Silver Bauhinia Star and, in 2011, the Gold Bauhinia Star.

== Personal life ==
Lam owns 3 residential properties, 7 commercial properties, and 11 parking spots in Hong Kong. In addition, Lam owns a factory building and 3 pieces of land in mainland China.

Legislative Council of Hong Kong
Preceded by James Tien	Member of Legislative Council; Representative for Commercial; 2004–2025	Succeeded by Jonathan Lamport
Order of precedence
Preceded by Arthur Li; Non-official member of the Executive Council	Hong Kong order of precedence Non-official member of the Executive Council	Succeeded by Tommy Cheung; Non-official member of the Executive Council
