= Indigenous inhabitants of the New Territories =

Indigenous peoples of Hong Kong

- Chinese: 新界原居民
Transcriptions
Standard Mandarin
- Hanyu Pinyin: Xīnjiè yuán jūmín
Hakka
- Pha̍k-fa-sṳ: Sîn kie ngièn kî mìn
Yue: Cantonese
- Yale Romanization: Sān gaai yùhn gēui màhn
- Jyutping: San1 gaai3 jyun4 goei1 man4

Indigenous inhabitants are people descended through the male line from a person who was in 1898, before Convention for the Extension of Hong Kong Territory was signed, a resident of an established village in the New Territories of Hong Kong.

== Special rights ==
Indigenous inhabitants have special rights to preserve their customs. When the sovereignty of Hong Kong was transferred from the United Kingdom to the People's Republic of China in 1997, these special rights were preserved under the Hong Kong Basic Law.

Article 40 of the Basic Law

The lawful traditional rights and interests of the indigenous inhabitants of the "New Territories" shall be protected by the Hong Kong Special Administrative Region.

=== Villages ===
Special rights are restricted to the village that the indigenous inhabitant is from. In order to protect the tradition of villages, male indigenous inhabitants have the right to apply for small house, known as Ting Uk (Chinese: 丁屋; Hong Kong Hakka: Den^{1} Vuk^{5}). Properties are only inherited by male members of a village. The interests of indigenous inhabitants are represented by the Heung Yee Kuk (Chinese: 鄉議局; Hong Kong Hakka: Hiong^{1} Ngi^{4} Kiuk^{6}).

=== Land for housing ===
In 2021, the Liber Research Community found sites of suspected of illegal collusion between developers and villagers, and additionally found villager land that could otherwise be used for housing in Hong Kong, contrary to the government's claim that the land was "unfit" for development.

== People living on boats ==
People have been living on boats in the New Territories for generations, and they do not usually own land or houses. They have no special rights because the Hong Kong government since 1898 only recognises established villages (Chinese: 認可鄉村; Hong Kong Hakka: Ngin^{4}ko^{3} Hiong^{1}con^{1}).

== Conflicts between indigenous and non-indigenous inhabitants ==
As a result of a large influx of non-indigenous inhabitants into the rural villages, conflicts between indigenous and non-indigenous inhabitants are surfacing. Because the management of a village was only in the hand of indigenous inhabitants, non-indigenous inhabitants could not participate in the matters of the village.

The indigenous inhabitants of Hong Kong spoke Tanka, Mei-Hui Hakka, Hailufeng Min (closer to Teochew dialect than Hokkien) and Yue Chinese Weitou dialect which is different from the newcomers who spoke contemporary standard Cantonese.

== Conflicts between villages ==
"Internally, inter-village feuds were common. They amounted to mini-wars, often lasting for years and marked by deaths in armed struggles and the destruction of houses and crops. The causes of strife were often rooted in access to, or protection of, precious water for irrigation, and other economic assets, such as the control of ferries and markets. Disputes over fung-shui of settlements or ancestral graves were not uncommon because the belief of sitings being directly linked with prosperity or adversity. Superior geomantic skills were in demand, since they could be used to injure the fung-shui of another village, lineage, branch lineage or family, or even to drive out earlier settlers." (Hayes, 2012)

== See also ==
- Hong Kong Punti people (also known as Weitou people)
- Hong Kong Hakka people
- Hong Kong Tanka people
- Hokkien people
- Convention for the Extension of Hong Kong Territory
- Housing in Hong Kong
