= Heung Yee Kuk =

Hong Kong statutory advisory body

- 鄉議局
- Emblem of the Heung Yee Kuk

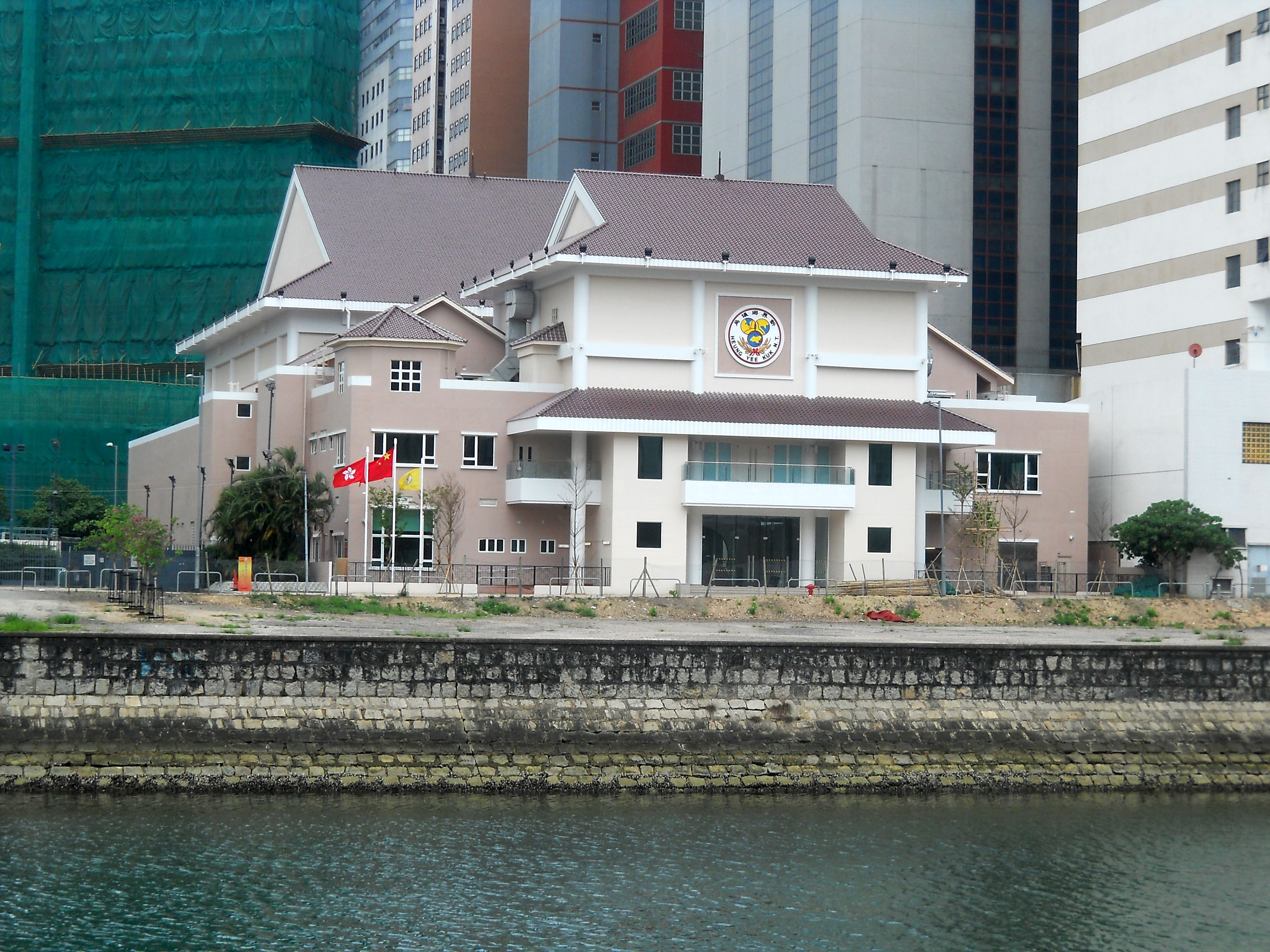
- Heung Yee Kuk Building in Shek Mun.

Agency overview
- Formed: 1926; 100 years ago
- Headquarters: 30 On Muk Street, Shek Mun, Sha Tin, NT
- Agency executives: Kenneth Lau, Chairman; Cheung Hok-ming and Daniel Lam, Vice-Chairmen
- Website: hyknt.org

Heung Yee Kuk
- Traditional Chinese: 鄉議局
- Simplified Chinese: 乡议局
- Literal meaning: Rural Council
Transcriptions
Standard Mandarin
- Hanyu Pinyin: Xiāng Yìjú
Yue: Cantonese
- Yale Romanization: Heung yi guhk
- Jyutping: Hoeng^{1} ji^{3} guk^{6}

Heung Yee Kuk N.T.
- Traditional Chinese: 新界鄉議局
- Simplified Chinese: 新界乡议局
- Literal meaning: Rural Council of the New Territories
Transcriptions
Standard Mandarin
- Hanyu Pinyin: Xīnjiè Xiāngyìjú
Yue: Cantonese
- Jyutping: San^{1} gaai^{3} Hoeng^{1} ji^{3} guk^{6}

The Heung Yee Kuk, officially the Heung Yee Kuk N.T., is a statutory advisory body representing establishment interests in the New Territories, Hong Kong. The council is a powerful organisation comprising heads of rural committees which represent villages and market towns.

From 1980 to 2015, it was chaired by Lau Wong-fat, a billionaire landowner and heavyweight political figure in the pro-Beijing camp, until he stepped down and was succeeded by his son Kenneth Lau.

The organisation has its own functional constituency seat in the Hong Kong Legislative Council. Despite having less than 150 registered voters, it also controls 26 seats on the 1200-member committee which selects the chief executive of Hong Kong.

== History ==
In 1906, eight years after the lease of the New Territories from the Qing China began, the British colonial government of Hong Kong interceded in the land rights of indigenous male villagers by converting those rights to block crown leases (on which crown rent was payable) over village land, creating significant discontent among villagers. The growing antagonism between villagers and the administration was exacerbated when, in 1923, the government imposed restraints on building of village houses on land held by villagers under the leases, including imposing a tax (known as a premium) on permission to build if granted.

Tensions, whipped up by the newly formed Chinese Communist Party, boiled over in 1925 and the major upheavals of the Canton–Hong Kong strike crippled Hong Kong.It was in these circumstances that the Heung Yee Kuk was formed the next year from the New Territories Association of Agricultural, Industrial and Commercial Research, to "work and negotiate with the government to promote the welfare of the people of the New Territories". It was given formal status by the Heung Yee Kuk Ordinance (Chapter 1097), first enacted 11 December 1959 (originally as no. 45 of 1959) amid the construction of the first New Towns in the New Territories. The Kuk then consisted of 27 Rural Committees representing, in turn, 651 villages. All village representatives on the Rural Committees, generally appointed by village consensus but sometimes by election, had to be male heads of households. After just one such election was found to have been rigged in 1957, the government withdrew recognition of the Kuk entirely. The committees were, in any event, only representative of indigenous villagers, excluding large swathes of the New Territories population right from the Kuk's earliest days.

After becoming a statutory advisory body, the Kuk met regularly with the New Territories Administration to discuss local issues and influence government policies. Tension came to a head in 1971 when a gathering of a thousand villagers in protest at government Small House Policy was described by the New Territories Commissioner Denis Bray as a "village uprising".

As part of administrative reforms proposed by McKinsey in 1974, the colonial government established the position of Secretary for the New Territories to communicate with the Kuk and prepare for development of the area.

Over the years the organisation has dabbled in charity work. For example, in 1966 it donated HK$660,000 to found the Heung Yee Kuk Yuen Long District Secondary School, in Yuen Long.

The Kuk is almost exclusively operated by men. In 1994, legislator Christine Loh attempted to allow female villagers the same land-inheritance rights as men, but the Kuk protested, claiming that granting females equal inheritance rights would interfere with rural issues. The Kuk sent 25 members to London to protest against the bill, which eventually passed despite their protests.

The Kuk was also involved with the Wang Chau housing controversy, where a planned development was downsized in the interests of the Kuk.

In October 2023, local news reported that the Kuk opposed against building public housing on parts of the Hong Kong Golf Club.

== Small House Policy ==
The Kuk advocates for the Small House Policy, a male-only policy which discriminates against female villagers. According to Apple Daily, males are entitled to build a house, worth approximately US$2,600,000 at around a cost of about US$700,000. Some villagers own the land for five years, and then illegally sell it to developers in a process called "flipping."

In April 2019, the High Court ruled that two out of three methods for obtaining a small house grant (private treaty grants and exchanges) would become banned. The Kuk threatened to ask Beijing for help if an appeal to the April 2019 ruling was not granted, in addition to spending HKD $30M on the first round of judicial review. Despite the Small House Policy being a generous government policy that helps male villagers obtain housing, Kingsley Sit Ho-yin, director of the Kuk's think tank, the Heung Yee Kuk Research Centre, said "Rural villagers have no responsibility to help the government solve the housing shortage. Villagers also face a land shortage. Why does the government not take back more land for us to build small houses?"

== See also ==
- United front in Hong Kong
