= 8th Legislative Council of Hong Kong =

Legislative session since 2026

←	7th LegCo	9th LegCo	→
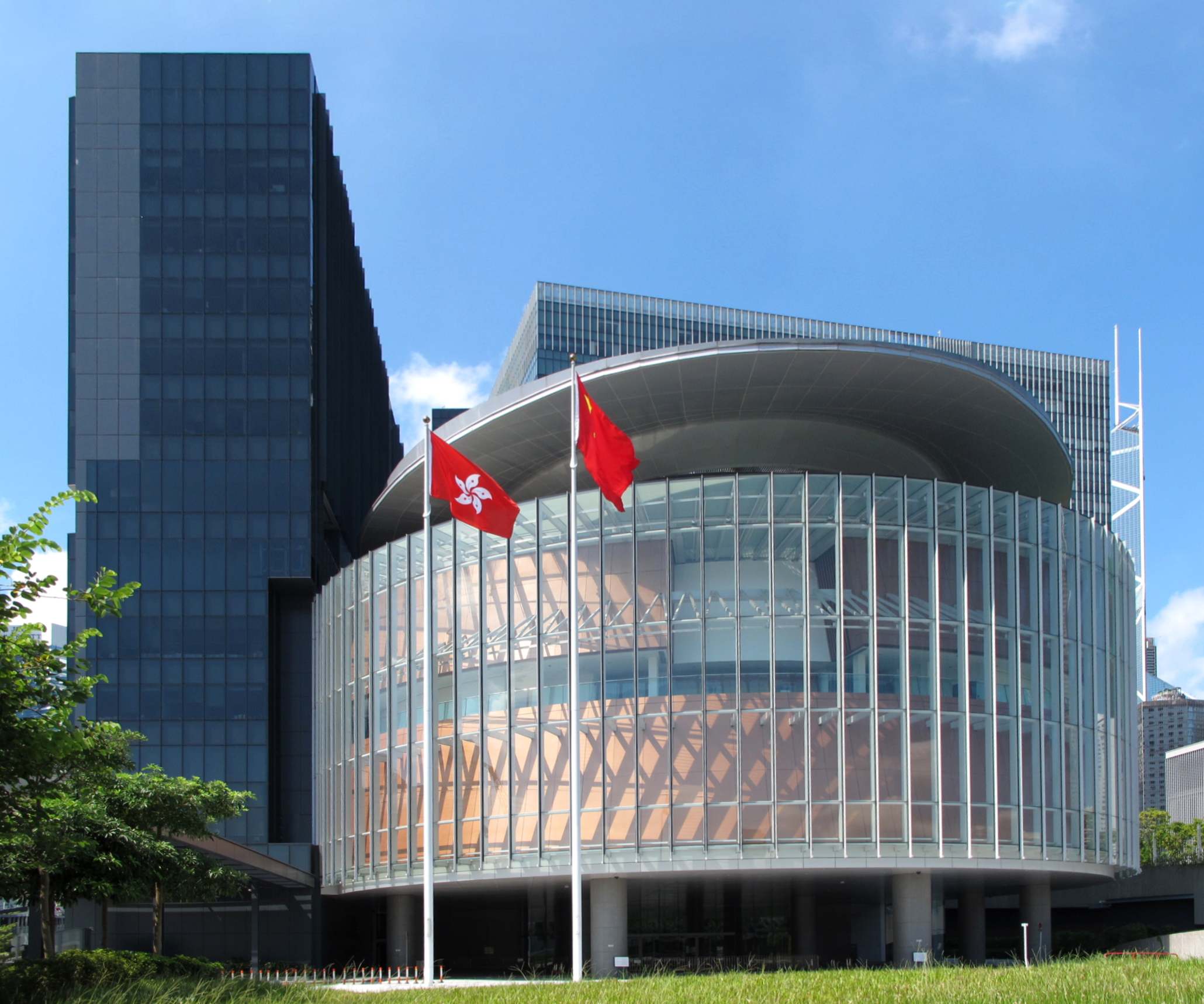

Overview
- Legislative body: Legislative Council
- Jurisdiction: Hong Kong
- Meeting place: Legislative Council Complex
- Term: 1 January 2026 –
- Election: 2025 election
- Government: Lee Administration
- Members: 90 members
- President: Starry Lee (DAB)
- Party control: Pro-Beijing camp

The Eighth Legislative Council of Hong Kong is the current eighth meeting of the legislative branch of the Hong Kong Special Administrative Region government. Its term of office begun on 1 January 2026.

This is the second "patriot-only" parliament, and is composed of solely pro-Beijing members for the first time without any legislator claiming to be from the "non-establishment". The allocation of seats remains the same as the last session; only 20 seats were elected directly through geographical constituencies, plus 40 seats selected by the Election Committee and 20 seats allocated to the functional constituencies.

Starry Lee was elected as the president of the council on 8 January 2026 after defeating the other candidate Chan Chun-ying with 47 votes to 42.

== Major events ==
- 1 January 2026: Commencement of this Council's term of office.
- 8 January 2026: Election of the president of the council.
- 14 January 2026: First Council Meeting.
- 3 July 2026: Wong Kam-fai resigned from the Council over drunk-driving and hit-and-run.

== Leadership ==
Presiding

- President: Starry Lee
- Chairman of the House Committee: Chan Chun-ying

=== Pro-Beijing camp ===
After her election as the President, Starry Lee established a new 12-member "coordination group" in order to make the legislature more efficient and effective. The group will handle various legislature's affairs such as selecting the chairmen and members of panels.

- Chief Coordinators: Chan Chun-ying, Ng Chau-pei
- Party representatives: Gary Chan (DAB), Jimmy Ng (BPA), Ng Chau-pei (FTU), Peter Shiu (Liberal), Judy Chan (NPP)
- Leader of Geographical Constituency members: Holden Chow, Kitson Yang
- Leader of Functional Constituency members: Peter Shiu, Lee Wai-wang
- Leader of Election Committee Constituency members: Priscilla Leung, Chan Siu-hung, Yiu Pak-leung

== Secretariat ==
- Secretary General: Dora Wai

== Composition ==
Affiliation	Members	
Affiliation	Elected	Current
DAB	20	20
BPA	8	8
FTU	7	7
Liberal	4	4
FEW	2	4
NPP	3	3
KWND	1	3
FLU	2	2
Roundtable	1	1
PP	1	1
NTAS	1	1
Independent	40	35
Vacant	N/A	1
Total	90	89

== List of Members ==
All members are listed by seniority according to the year of the beginning of consecutive service then the order of swearing in (i.e. the number of strokes in the traditional characters of names in Chinese per precedent) with the president of the Legislative Council being ranked first.

Members who did not serve throughout the term are italicised. Supplementary members elected in by-elections are listed below.

Capacity	Constituency	Portrait	Elected Members	Elected Party	Political Alignment	Born	Occupation(s)	Assumed Office
President of the Legislative Council
GC	Kowloon Central		Starry Lee	DAB	Pro-Beijing	13 March 1974	Accountant; Legislative Councillor	2008
Other members
GC	New Territories North East		Chan Hak-kan	DAB/NTAS	Pro-Beijing	24 April 1976	Legislative Councillor	2008
ECC	Election Committee		Priscilla Leung	BPA/KWND	Pro-Beijing	18 November 1960	Professor; Barrister-at-law	2008
ECC	Election Committee		Steven Ho	DAB	Pro-Beijing	30 November 1979	Legislative Councillor	2012
ECC	Election Committee		Chan Han-pan	DAB/NTAS	Pro-Beijing	1975	Legislative Councillor	2012
ECC	Election Committee		Elizabeth Quat	DAB	Pro-Beijing	23 December 1966	Legislative Councillor	2012
FC	Industrial (Second)		Jimmy Ng	BPA	Pro-Beijing	17 June 1969	Company Director	2016
ECC	Election Committee		Junius Ho	Independent	Pro-Beijing	4 June 1962	Solicitor	2016
GC	New Territories North West		Holden Chow	DAB/NTAS	Pro-Beijing	7 June 1979	Solicitor	2016
FC	Wholesale and Retail		Shiu Ka-fai	Liberal	Pro-Beijing	22 April 1970	Company Director	2016
FC	Finance		Chan Chun-ying	Independent (G19)	Pro-Beijing	1961	Advisor	2016
FC	Heung Yee Kuk		Kenneth Lau	BPA	Pro-Beijing	1966	Company vice-chairman	2016
GC	Kowloon West		Vincent Cheng	DAB	Pro-Beijing	18 July 1979	Legislative Councillor	2018 (b)
ECC	Election Committee		Hoey Simon Lee	Independent (G19)	Pro-Beijing	1977	Chief Strategy Officer	2022
FC	Financial Services		Robert Lee	Independent (G19)	Pro-Beijing	1980	Company Director	2022
GC	New Territories North East		Dominic Lee	NPP/CF	Pro-Beijing	22 January 1984	Company Director	2022
ECC	Election Committee		Lee Chun-keung	Liberal	Pro-Beijing	22 August 1984	Legislative Councillor; Engineer; Manager	2022
GC	Hong Kong Island East		Stanley Ng	FTU	Pro-Beijing	1970	Trade unionist	2022
ECC	Election Committee		Johnny Ng	Independent	Pro-Beijing	1974	Company Director	2022
FC	Labour		Chau Siu-chung	FLU	Pro-Beijing	1970	Trade unionist	2022
FC	Medical and Health Services		David Lam	Independent	Pro-Beijing	1966	Surgeon	2022
ECC	Election Committee		Lam Chun-sing	FLU	Pro-Beijing	1981	Trade Unionist	2022
ECC	Election Committee		Nixie Lam	DAB	Pro-Beijing	13 March 1982	Legislative Councillor; Board member	2022
ECC	Election Committee		Andrew Lam	Independent	Pro-Beijing	1961	Company Chairman	2022
FC	Technology and Innovation		Duncan Chiu	Independent (G19)	Pro-Beijing	1974	Merchant	2022
ECC	Election Committee		Yiu Pak-leung	Independent (G19)	Pro-Beijing	11 March 1974	Chairman of China Travel Service (Hong Kong)	2022
ECC	Election Committee		Dennis Leung	FTU	Pro-Beijing	6 October 1973	Legislative Councillor	2022
GC	Kowloon West		Leung Man-kwong	KWND	Pro-Beijing	3 August 1984	Legislative Councillor	2022
ECC	Election Committee		Rock Chen	DAB	Pro-Beijing	6 June 1966	Investment Manager	2022
FC	Insurance		Chan Pui-leung	Independent (G19)	Pro-Beijing	1959	Legislative Councillor; China Taiping Insurance (HK) General Manager	2022
FC	HKSAR members of NPC and CPPCC, Representatives of National Organisations		Chan Yung	DAB/NTAS	Pro-Beijing	6 June 1966	Hong Kong Deputies to National People's Congress; Legislative Councillor; Social Worker	2022
FC	Textiles and Garment		Sunny Tan	BPA	Pro-Beijing	1973	Legislative Councillor; Senior Advisor	2022
GC	Hong Kong Island West		Judy Chan	NPP	Pro-Beijing	4 April 1980	Legislative Councillor	2022
ECC	Election Committee		Maggie Chan	Independent (G19)	Pro-Beijing	3 February 1969	Solicitor	2022
ECC	Election Committee		Chan Siu-hung	Independent	Pro-Beijing	1958	Engineer; Legislative Councillor	2022
ECC	Election Committee		Chan Hoi-yan	Independent	Pro-Beijing	19 November 1977	Legislative Councillor; Company Director	2022
GC	New Territories South West		Joephy Chan	FTU	Pro-Beijing	16 December 1989	Trade Unionist	2022
GC	Hong Kong Island West		Chan Hok-fung	DAB	Pro-Beijing	1976	Banker	2022
ECC	Election Committee		Kingsley Wong	FTU	Pro-Beijing	1968	Party chairman	2022
GC	Kowloon Central		Yang Wing-kit	Independent	Pro-Beijing	1968	Legislative Councillor	2022
ECC	Election Committee		Peter Douglas Koon	Independent	Pro-Beijing	2 December 1965	Clergyman	2022
FC	Education		Tang Fei	FEW	Pro-Beijing	Unknown	Legislative Councillor	2022
GC	Kowloon East		Tang Ka-piu	FTU	Pro-Beijing	29 October 1979	Legislative Councillor; Community practitioner	2022
ECC	Election Committee		Lau Chi-pang	FEW	Pro-Beijing	1960	Professor	2022
FC	Sports, Performing Arts, Culture and Publication		Kenneth Fok	Independent (G19)	Pro-Beijing	2 July 1979	Merchant	2022
ECC	Election Committee		Carmen Kan	Independent (G19)	Pro-Beijing	1968	Solicitor; General Counsel of bank	2022
FC	Commercial (Third)		Erik Yim	Independent (G19)	Pro-Beijing	1972	Business Executive; Hong Kong Maritime and Port Development Board member	2022
ECC	Election Committee		Adrian Ho	NPP	Pro-Beijing	1977	Legislative Councillor	2022 (b)
ECC	Election Committee		Chan Wing-kwong	DAB	Pro-Beijing	1963	Chinese Medicine Practitioner; Legislative Councillor	2022 (b)
ECC	Election Committee		William Wong (Note: Resigned on 3 July 2026 over drink-driving and hit-and-run.)	Independent	Pro-Beijing	1960	Professor	2022 (b)
FC	Engineering		Aaron Bok	BPA	Pro-Beijing		Legislative Councillor	2026
GC	New Territories South East		Christine Fong	PP	Pro-Beijing		Legislative Councillor; Engineer	2026
ECC	Election Committee		Ginny Man	Independent	Pro-Beijing		Solicitor	2026
ECC	Election Committee		Chu Lap-wai	DAB/HKIF	Pro-Beijing		Legislative Councillor	2026
FC	Tourism		Vivian Kong	Independent	Pro-Beijing		Legislative Councillor	2026
ECC	Election Committee		Ng Wun-kit	Independent	Pro-Beijing		School principal Legislative Councillor	2026
ECC	Election Committee		Wu Yingpeng	Independent (G19)	Pro-Beijing		Barrister; Lawyer (China)	2026
FC	Accountancy		Webster Ng	Independent	Pro-Beijing		Legislative Councillor; Public accountant Tax adviser	2026
ECC	Election Committee		Elvin Lee	Independent (G19)	Pro-Beijing		Cultural Enterprise Management	2026
FC	Labour		Lee Kwong-yu	FTU	Pro-Beijing		Consultant	2026
FC	Commercial (First)		Jonathan Lamport	BPA	Pro-Beijing		Merchant	2026
FC	Labour		Lam Wai-kong	FTU	Pro-Beijing		District Councillor; Trade unionist	2026
FC	Transport		Lothair Lam	Independent (G19)	Pro-Beijing		Company chairman	2026
FC	Commercial (Second)		Andrew Yao	Independent (G19)	Pro-Beijing		Company chairman	2026
GC	New Territories North		Yiu Ming	DAB	Pro-Beijing		Legislative Councillor	2026
ECC	Election Committee		Alex Fan	Independent	Pro-Beijing		Barrister; Hainan International Arbitration Court president Lawyer (China); Adjunct professor	2026
ECC	Election Committee		Andrew Fan	Independent	Pro-Beijing		Public Accountants	2026
ECC	Election Committee		Hung Kam-in	DAB	Pro-Beijing			2026
FC	Social Welfare		Grace Chan	Independent	Pro-Beijing		Hong Kong Council of Social Service Chief Executive	2026
ECC	Election Committee		Alan Chan	Independent	Pro-Beijing		Chief Operations Officer	2026
ECC	Election Committee		Chan Cho-kwong	Independent	Pro-Beijing		Legislative Councillor; Media president	2026
FC	Agriculture and Fisheries		Chan Pok-chi	DAB	Pro-Beijing		Legislative Councillor	2026
FC	Legal		Nick Chan	Liberal	Pro-Beijing		Lawyer	2026
GC	New Territories South West		Kwok Fu-yung	DAB	Pro-Beijing		Legislative Councillor; District Councillor	2026
ECC	Election Committee		Albert Chuang	Independent (G19)	Pro-Beijing		Merchant	2026
GC	New Territories North West		Chong Ho-fung	Roundtable	Pro-Beijing		Legislative Councillor	2026
GC	Kowloon East		Cheung Pui-kong	DAB	Pro-Beijing		Legislative Councillor	2026
FC	Catering		Jonathan Leung	Liberal	Pro-Beijing		Legislative Councillor	2026
FC	Industrial (First)		Ray Wong	BPA	Pro-Beijing		Legislative Councillor; Innovative industrialist	2026
FC	Real Estate and Construction		Augustine Wong	Independent	Pro-Beijing		Henderson Land Development Executive Director	2026
ECC	Election Committee		Ken Wong	FEW	Pro-Beijing		School principal	2026
GC	Hong Kong Island East		Elaine Chik	DAB	Pro-Beijing		Legislative Councillor	2026
GC	New Territories South East		Chris Ip	DAB	Pro-Beijing		Company director	2026
FC	Architectural, Surveying, Planning and Landscape		Julia Lau	Independent	Pro-Beijing		Architect	2026
ECC	Election Committee		Lau Ka-keung	Independent (G19)	Pro-Beijing		Management	2026
ECC	Election Committee		Michelle Tang	BPA	Pro-Beijing		Civil engineer District Councillor	2026
FC	Import and Export		Tommy Chung	Independent (G19)	Pro-Beijing		Legislative Councillor	2026
ECC	Election Committee		Michael Ngai	Independent	Pro-Beijing		Businessman	2026
GC	New Territories North		Tam Chun-kwok	NTAS	Pro-Beijing		Legislative Councillor	2026
ECC	Election Committee		Thomas So	Independent	Pro-Beijing		Solicitor	2026

=== Changes ===
- 1 January 2026: Tang Fei (Education) declared his affiliation with FEW.
- 3 July 2026: William Wong resigns over drink driving and hit-and-run scandal.

== Committees ==
- House Committee
  - Parliamentary Liaison Subcommittee
- Finance Committee
  - Establishment Subcommittee
  - Public Works Subcommittee
- Public Accounts Committee
- Committee on Members' Interests
- Committee on Rules of Procedure

=== Panels ===
- Panel on Administration of Justice and Legal Services
- Panel on Commerce and Industry
- Panel on Constitutional Affairs
- Panel on Development
- Panel on Economic Development
- Panel on Education
- Panel on Environmental Affairs
- Panel on Financial Affairs
- Panel on Food Safety and Environmental Hygiene
- Panel on Health Services
- Panel on Home Affairs
- Panel on Housing
- Panel on Information Technology and Broadcasting
- Panel on Manpower
- Panel on Security
- Panel on Transport
- Panel on Welfare Services
