= 2026 President of the Hong Kong Legislative Council election =

Election for the President of the Eighth Legislative Council
- 8 January 2026
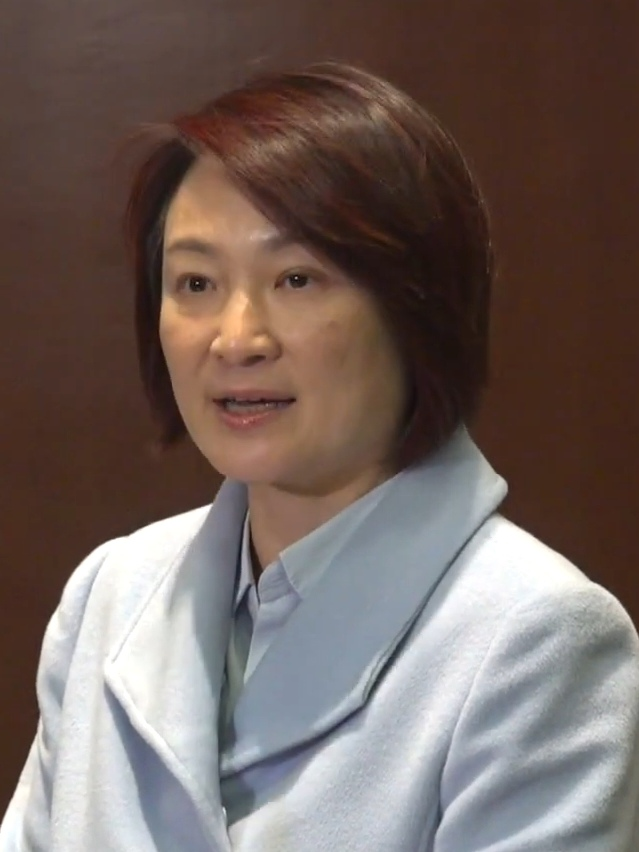

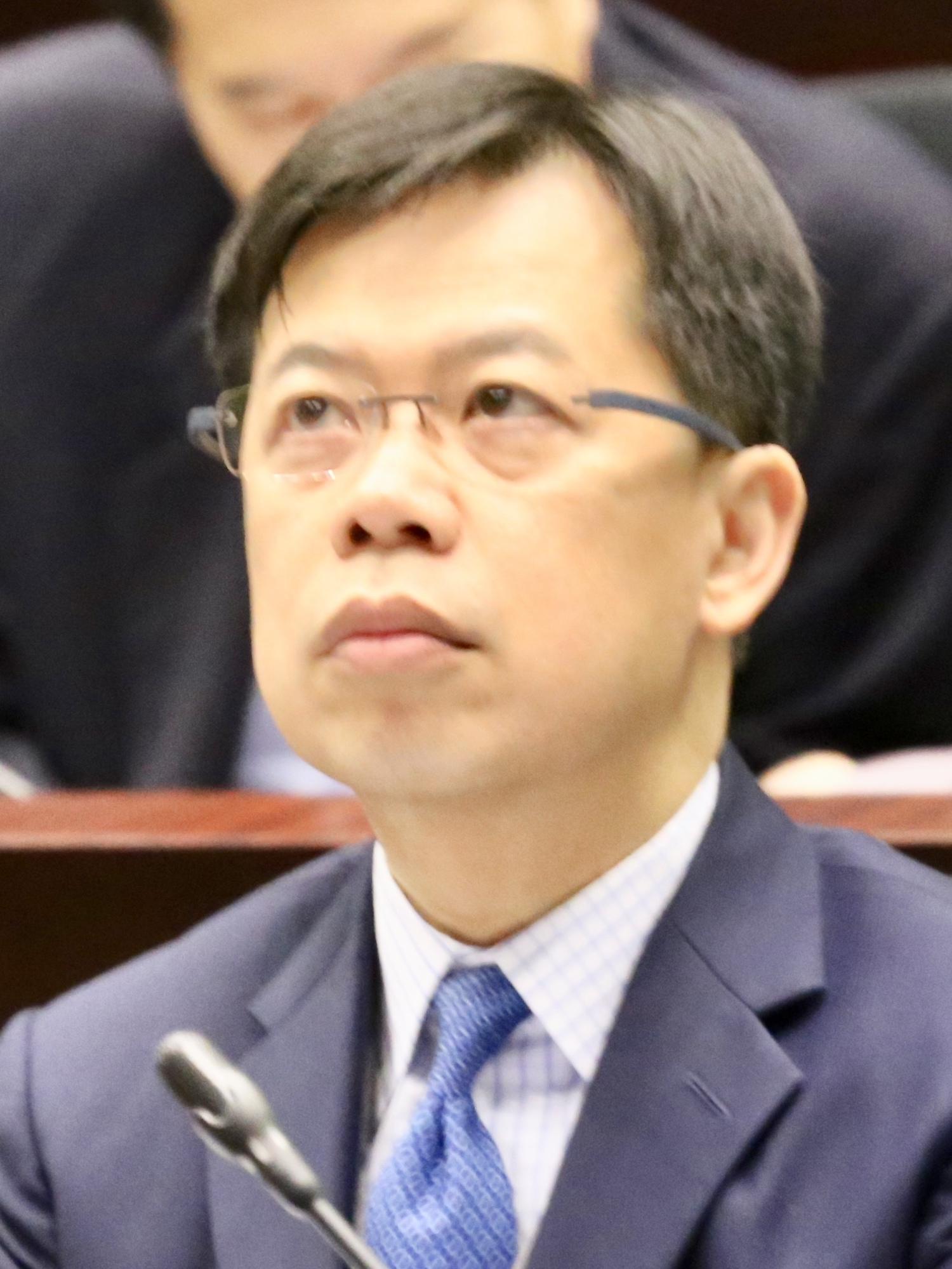
	Majority party	Minority party
Candidate	Starry Lee	Chan Chun-ying
Party	DAB	Independent
Constituency	Kowloon Central	Finance
Votes	47 (52.80%)	42 (47.20%)
President before election
Andrew Leung
BPA
Elected President
Starry Lee
DAB

The election for the president of the Eighth Legislative Council took place on 8 January 2026 for members of the 8th Legislative Council of Hong Kong to among themselves elect the president of the Legislative Council of Hong Kong for the duration of the council. Starry Lee, a serving member of the Standing Committee of the National People's Congress and former chairlady of the flagship pro-Beijing party DAB, defeated pro-business Chan Chun-ying and was elected as the president.

== Background ==
Andrew Leung, the two-term president of the legislature, retired from the Legislative Council before the general election begins citing age. Since then, Starry Lee, Chan Chun-ying, Martin Liao, and Chan Kin-por emerged as possible successors. After both Liao and Chan Kin-por announced their intention to stand down, the speakership is considered to be held by either Lee or Chan Chun-ying. Chan is seen more likely to win the race as Lee is also a member of the Standing Committee of the National People's Congress (NPCSC) which would require her attendance in Beijing and could be suspected for a conflict of role.

By Christmas it is expected that Chan would win unopposed without challenges from within the pro-Beijing camp. However, Lee hinted her wish to fight on by commenting that she could concurrently serve as the president of the legislature and a member of the NPCSC. Both Chan and Lee submitted their nomination by the end of the period on 2 January. This is the first contested election since the 2016 race, and the first between pro-Beijing members.

== Procedures ==
According to Article 71 of the Hong Kong Basic Law and Rule 4 of the Rules of Procedure of the Legislative Council, the president of the Legislative Council has to be a Chinese citizen of 40 years old or above, a permanent resident of Hong Kong with no right of abode in any foreign country, and has ordinarily resided in Hong Kong for not less than 20 years continuously. Schedule 1 of the Rules of Procedure of the Legislative Council stipulates the procedures of the election for president. The clerk to the Legislative Council will prepare a list of all the nominations in the order of receipt and distribute to all members at least two clear days before the day of the election. Before the election, candidates will be able to present their manifesto and answer questions in a special forum.

== Candidates ==
Candidate	Party affiliation	Political camp	Born	Political office
Starry Lee Wai-king	DAB	Pro-Beijing	13 March 1974 (age 51); Hong Kong	Member of Legislative Council for Kowloon West (2008–2012), District Council (Second) (2012–2021), Kowloon Central (since 2022) Chairman of House Committee (2016–2025); Member of the Executive Council (2012–2016); Chairman of the DAB (2015–2023)
Ronick Chan Chun-ying	Independent	Pro-Beijing	1961 (age 64–65); Hong Kong	Member of Legislative Council for Finance (since 2016) Chairman of Finance Committee (2022–2025)

== Results ==
According to media reports, the election was conducted under a free vote, despite party members could have still been whipped. DAB party grandees are said to have made strong effort and lobbying to secure sufficient support for Lee. Lee is believed to have the support of main parties, including DAB, FTU, Liberal, FEW, NTAS and at least five independents, while Chan was backed by mostly BPA, pro-business members, and independents. Eventually, Starry Lee was narrowly elected with 47 votes, a majority of 5, defeating Chan who secured 42 votes. Hoey Simon Lee, who was expected to support Chan, did not cast his vote due to a flight delay. There are also rumours that some voted in favour of Lee despite seconding Chan's nomination.

Lee thus became the second NPCSC member to be elected to the presidency after Rita Fan. Former opposition member Sin Chung-kai said the role of the president has shifted from referee to captain, while former veteran and chair of NPP Regina Ip said Starry Lee may eye for the position of Chief Executive, following the path of Macau's leader Ho Iat-seng. Chan was later elected to succeed Lee as the chairman of the House Committee.

Candidate	Ballots in favour	
Candidate	Votes	%
Starry Lee ✓	47	52.80
Chan Chun-ying	42	47.20
Turnout	89	98.89
