= G19 =

G19 may refer to:

- ARM Galeana (G19), an Auk-class minesweeper of the Mexican Navy
- County Route G19 (California)
- Glock 19, a pistol
- G19 (Hong Kong), a parliamentary group in Hong Kong
- HMS Leamington (G19), a Wickes-class destroyer of the Royal Navy
- Logitech G19, a computer keyboard
- SS France (1961) (hull number G19), a French ocean liner
