= G19 (Hong Kong) =

Political alliance in Hong Kong

- Convener: Chan Chun-ying
- Founder: Yiu Si-wing; Martin Liao; Ma Fung-kwok; Chan Kin-por; Chan Chun-ying
- Founded: October 2016
- Regional affiliation: Pro-Beijing camp
- Legislative Council: 17 / 90

Website
- www.g19hk.com

G19 (Group of 19) is a parliamentary group of independent pro-Beijing lawmakers in Hong Kong. First known as G6 when established after the 2016 legislative election, the group expanded after the 2021 election and is considered to be the second largest alliance in the Legislative Council of Hong Kong. All of their members were not elected by the public and sit in the legislature as functional constituency or Election Committee constituency members.

== History ==
Similar loose political alliance for functional constituency elected or appointed members was formed as early as 1991 under the name of "Breakfast Group". The group underwent transformations as members of the group come and go, having renamed to "The Alliance" in 2004 and "Professional Forum" in 2008. In 2012, members of the Professional Forum joined the pro-business Business and Professionals Alliance for Hong Kong.

A new group for the independent members from the functional constituency was formed after the 2016 election, with five inaugural members. Tony Tse joined as the sixth member after the 2018 by-election. It was therefore known as "G6" (Group of 6).

The 2021 election saw an influx of pro-Beijing members that were not directly elected nor affiliated to political parties. The G6 absorbed these newcomers, expanded into an alliance with 19 members, and rebranded as "G19". The members would meet regularly to share views, and will strengthen liaison with other lawmakers and with the public. Although G19 is not considered to be a political party, it is widely considered the second largest group in the legislature, just after the Democratic Alliance for the Betterment and Progress of Hong Kong. The new platform allows independent members to wield more influence in the assembly, and is seen as a move favoured by the Chinese authorities to counter the traditional parties. Forging an alliance is also seen to be necessary to join parliamentary panels, as the revamped panels accept members on a party-list nature.

After the 2025 election, four senior members of the group left the assembly. Chan Chun-ying succeeded Tony Tse as the new convener. The group retained the name of G19 despite having 17 members, including 7 new members.

== Members ==
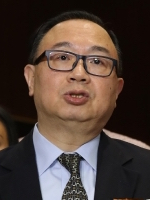
Martin Liao

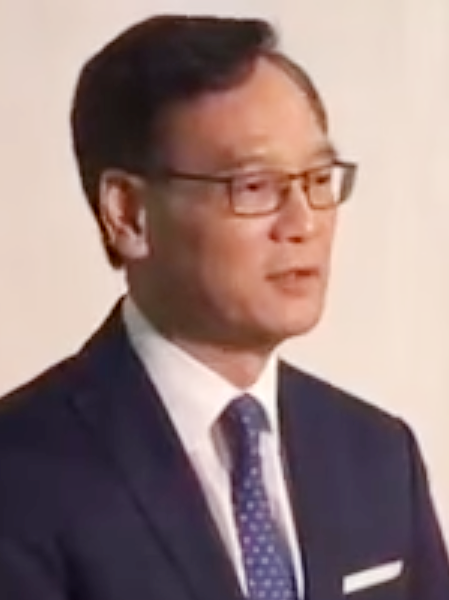
Tony Tse

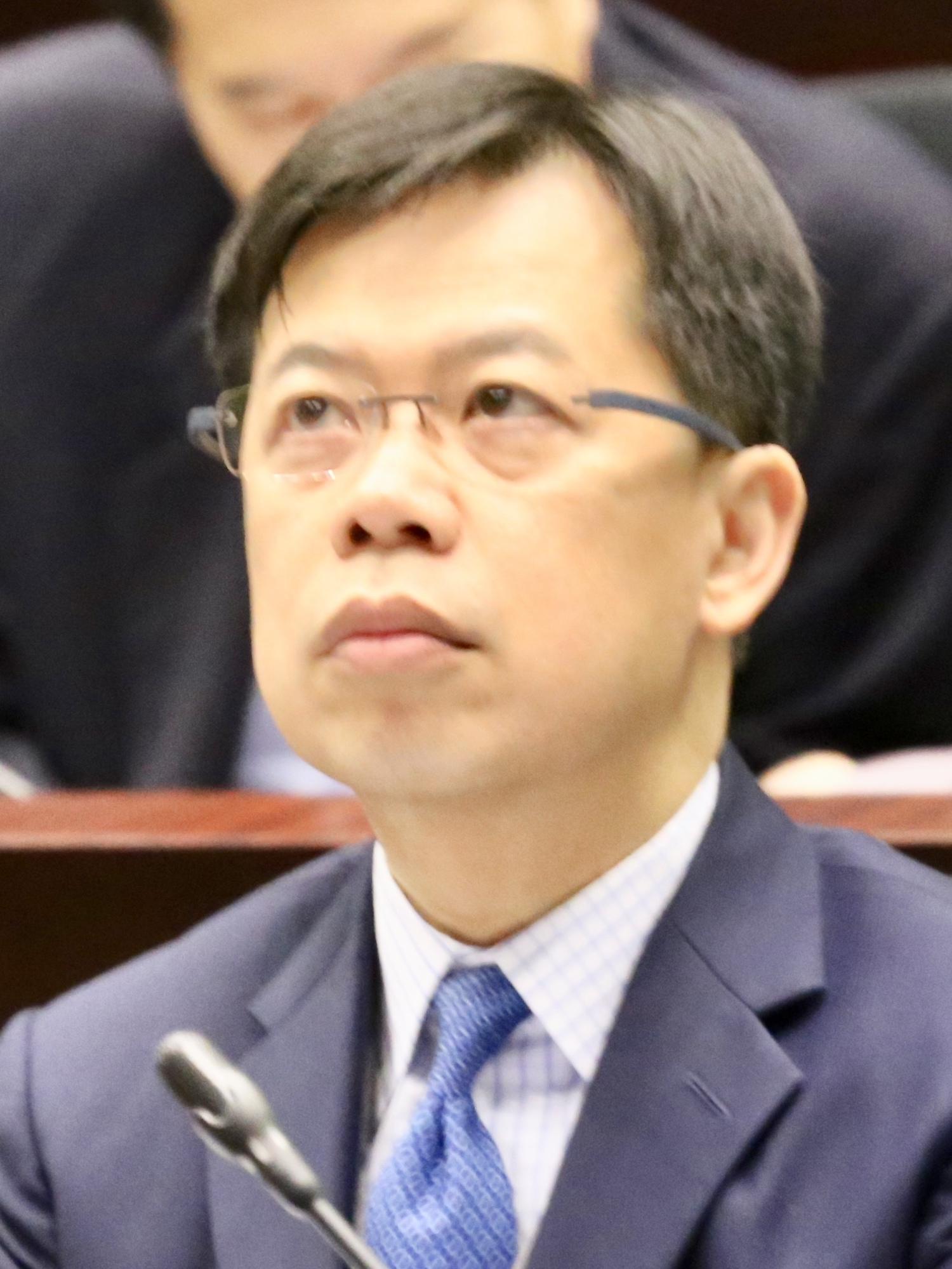
Chan Chun-ying

- Chan Chun-ying (2016–; convener since 2026)
- Kenneth Fok (2022–)
- Yiu Pak-leung (2022–)
- Erik Yim (2022–)
- Lee Wai-wang (2022–)
- Duncan Chiu (2022–)
- Hoey Simon Lee (2022–)
- Chan Pui-leung (2022–)
- Maggie Chan (2022–)
- Carmen Kan (2022–)
- Lothair Lam (2026–)
- Yao Cho-fai (2026–)
- Chung Ki-fung (2026–)
- Elvin Lee Ka-kui (2026–)
- Wu Yingpeng (2026–)
- Chuang Ka-pun (2026–)
- Lau Ka-keung (2026–)

=== Past members ===
- Yiu Si-wing (2016–2021)
- Martin Liao (2016–2025; convener from 2016 to 2020)
- Ma Fung-kwok (2016–2025; also a member of the New Century Forum)
- Chan Kin-por (2016–2025)
- Tony Tse (2018–2025; convener from 2021 to 2025)
- Stephen Wong (2022)
- Tan Yueheng (2022–2025)
- Wendy Hong (2022–2025)
- Leung Yuk-wai (2022–2025)
- Chow Man-kong (2022–2025)

== See also ==
- A4 Alliance
