= Ng Leung-sing =

- 吳亮星

Member of the Legislative Council
- In office 22 February 1997 – 4 April 1998 (Provisional Legislative Council)
- In office 2 July 1998 – 13 July 2004
- Constituency: Election Committee
- In office 10 October 2012 – 30 September 2016
- Preceded by: David Li
- Succeeded by: Chan Chun-ying
- Constituency: Finance

Personal details
- Born: 11 July 1949 (age 77) Hong Kong
- Spouse: Ng Chan Sau-han
- Children: One daughter and one son
- Education: Heung To Middle School; University of East Asia
- Occupation: Legislative Councillor; Vice-Chairman of the China & South Sea Bank Limited

Ng Leung-sing (Chinese: 吳亮星) is a former member of the Provisional Legislative Council and Legislative Council of Hong Kong for the Election Committee constituency and the Finance functional constituency from 1997 to 2004 and 2012 to 2016. He was also the Vice-chairman of the China & South Sea Bank Limited. He supported Leung Chun-ying in the 2012 Chief Executive race and is seen as an ally of CY Leung in the Legislative Council.

== Controversies ==
During the 2015 Hong Kong heavy metal in drinking water incidents, he became known for asking Carrie Lam whether there were any health benefits to consuming water "with an appropriate level of lead."

At 5 January 2016, he commented on the missing Causeway Bay bookseller incident, alleging that the missing booksellers were arrested for illegally entering the mainland to patronise prostitutes without any evidence. His comment was later reprimanded by the wife of one of the missing booksellers, Lee Bo, who stated that she retained her right to sue for libel.

Legislative Council of Hong Kong
New parliament	Member of Provisional Legislative Council; 1997–1998	Replaced by Legislative Council
New parliament	Member of Legislative Council; Representative for Election Committee; 1998–2004	Constituency eliminated
Preceded by Tommy Cheung	Chairman of Finance Committee; 2013–2014	Succeeded by Tommy Cheung
Preceded by David Li	Member of Legislative Council; Representative for Finance; 2012–2016	Succeeded by Chan Chun-ying
