= David Li =

Hong Kong banker and politician (born 1939)

Sir David Li GBM GBS OBE JP
- 李國寶
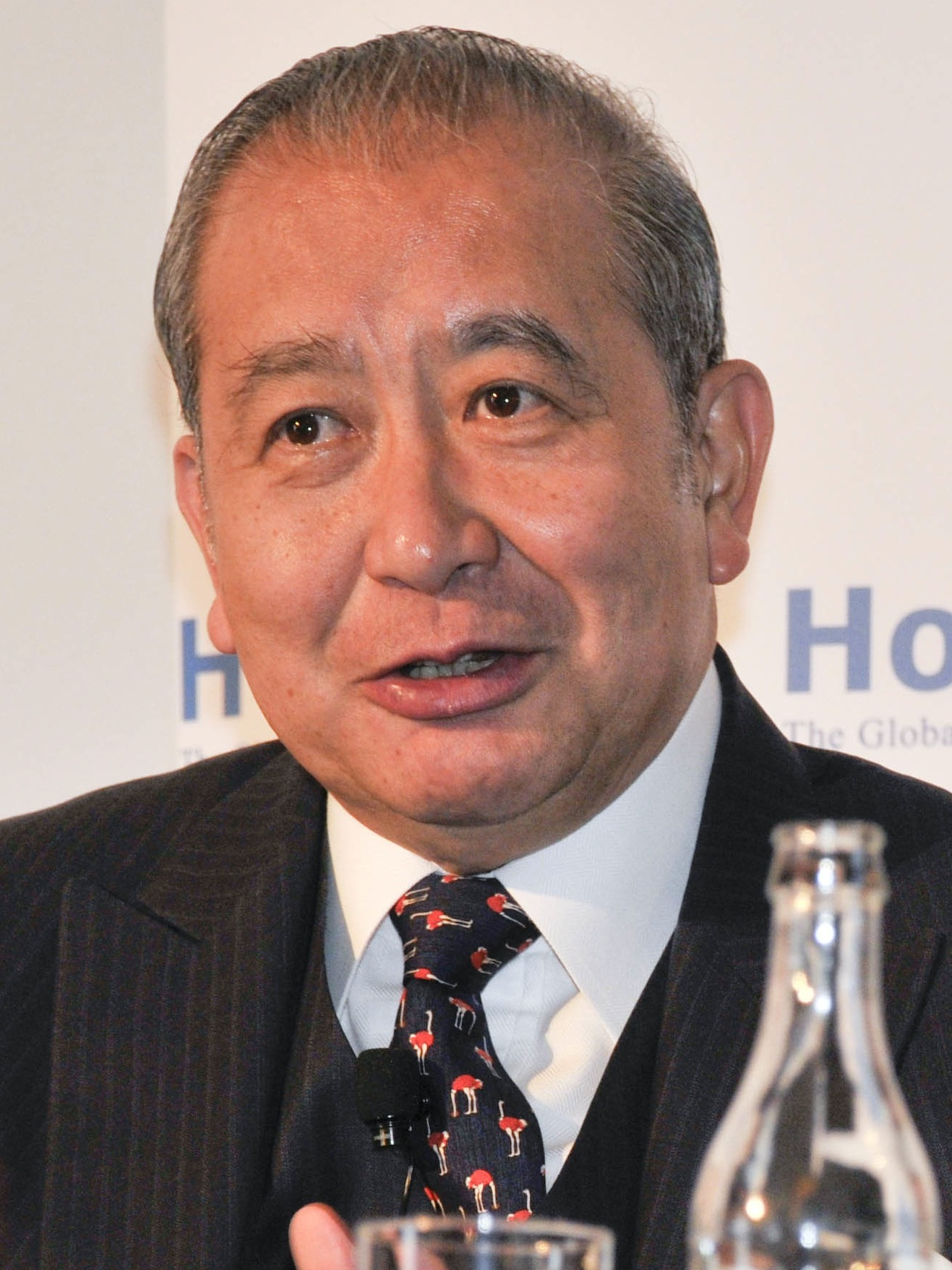
- Sir David Li Kwok-po at Horasis Global China Business Meeting, 2009

Chairman of the Bank of East Asia
- Incumbent
- Assumed office 9 April 1997

Non-official Member of the Executive Council of Hong Kong
- In office 1 November 2005 – 16 February 2008
- Appointed by: Donald Tsang

Member of the Legislative Council of Hong Kong
- In office 30 October 1985 – 30 June 1997
- Preceded by: New constituency
- Succeeded by: Replaced by Provisional Legislative Council
- Constituency: Financial/Finance
- In office 21 December 1996 – 30 June 1998 (Provisional Legislative Council)
- In office 1 July 1998 – 30 September 2012
- Preceded by: New parliament
- Succeeded by: Ng Leung-sing
- Constituency: Finance

Personal details
- Born: David Li Kwok-po; 13 March 1939 (age 87) London, England, UK
- Spouse: Penny Poon Kam-chui
- Children: Adrian David Li Man-kiu; Brian David Li Man-bun
- Education: Imperial College London; Selwyn College, Cambridge
- Occupation: Banker

David Li
- Traditional Chinese: 李國寶
Transcriptions
Yue: Cantonese
- Yale Romanization: Léih Gwok bóu
- Jyutping: Lei^{5} Gwok^{3} bou^{2}

Sir David Li Kwok-po GBM GBS OBE JP (Chinese: 李國寶; born 13 March 1939, London, England) is a Hong Kong banker and politician. He is the executive chairman of the Bank of East Asia and pro-chancellor of the University of Hong Kong. He was a member of the Legislative Council of Hong Kong and the Executive Council of Hong Kong in the 2000s.

== Family background ==
The Li family with roots in Heshan, Jiangmen, Guangdong, China has long had a prominent position in Hong Kong. David Li's great-grandfather, Li Shek-tang, made his fortune bringing rice to Hong Kong from Vietnam. In 1918, Li's grandfather, Li Koon-chun, along with his great-uncle, founded the Bank of East Asia, the first Chinese-owned bank in the territory. His father, Li Fook-shu, was a director of the Bank of East Asia, an Unofficial member of the Legislative Council and council member of the Chinese University of Hong Kong. Li's younger brother is Arthur Li Kwok-cheung, former Secretary for Education and Manpower and Chairman of the Council of the University of Hong Kong. David's cousins include the Hong Kong Court of Final Appeal's first Chief Justice Andrew Li Kwok-nang. One of his uncles is the late Simon Li Fook-sean, a senior judge who ran in the first election for chief executive in 1996, whose daughter is prominent democrat, barrister Gladys Li, and another the late Ronald Li Fook-siu, the disgraced former chairman of the Hong Kong Stock Exchange.

== Education ==
Li was educated at Uppingham School in the United Kingdom. He studied mathematics at Imperial College London, and then studied economics and law at Selwyn College, University of Cambridge.

He received an honorary doctorate in law from the University of Warwick in July 1994 and another one from the University of Hong Kong in March 1996. In November 1996, he received an honorary doctorate of social sciences from Lingnan College. Li joined the Bank of East Asia in 1969, becoming Chief Executive in 1981 and Chairman in 1997.

== Political and academic positions ==
Li was a member of the Legislative Council, elected unopposed in the Finance functional constituency in 2004 and 2008. From October 2005 until his resignation in February 2008, he was a member of the Executive Council, appointed after renouncing his British citizenship. He is currently Pro-Chancellor of the University of Hong Kong.

== Board memberships ==
Li is also a director at several Hong Kong listed companies including fixed line phone carrier PCCW, SCMP Group and Hong Kong and Shanghai Hotels. In addition, he is chairman of the Chinese Banks Association Ltd.

== Legal issues ==
=== Dow Jones ===
On 1 May 2007, News Corporation made a public announcement of its bid for Dow Jones & Company. The United States Securities and Exchange Commission filed an initial complaint seven days later naming Wong Kan-king and his wife Charlotte, both residents of Hong Kong, as defendants after its investigation of suspicious share price movements in the run-up to the announcement. The SEC alleged that the couple purchased 415,000 shares through a Merrill Lynch Hong Kong account between 13 and 30 April, and had reaped a US$8.2 million profit on disposal following announcement of the bid.

The SEC later filed an amended complaint ("The First Amended Complaint") identifying the source of the information as David Li, who had obtained the information by being a board member of Dow Jones. The SEC alleged that Li had informed his close friend and business associate Michael Leung, who in turn told his daughter and son-in-law. The amended complaint added David Li and Michael Leung as co-defendants and details how Leung traded through the account of his daughter and son-in-law with their assistance.

At the end of January 2008, a settlement was reached where Li was ordered to pay an $8.1 million civil penalty, Leung to pay $8.1 million in disgorgement and an $8.1 million penalty; K. K. Wong would pay $40,000 in disgorgement plus prejudgment interest and a $40,000 civil penalty. Li would neither admit nor deny any wrongdoing.

Li's integrity is being questioned by Legislators, and corporate gadfly David Webb was the first to put Li under pressure to relinquish his position as a member of both the Legislative and the Executive Councils of Hong Kong because of his implication in the affair. Several other legislators added to the pressure for Li to relinquish his cabinet (Exco) position, although there are divergent views on his continued LegCo membership. On 17 February 2008, Li announced his resignation from Exco.

=== Donald Tsang Yam-kuen ===
In January 2017, prosecutors claimed that, in July 2010, Li had assisted the then Chief Executive of the Hong Kong Special Administrative Region Donald Tsang Yam-kuen (through Tsang's wife) in the latter's attempt to cover up an alleged corrupt deal to secure a super-luxury apartment in Shenzhen, by drawing a HK$350,000 cash cheque and passing the money to Tsang's wife.

== Awards and recognition ==
Li was appointed an Officer of the Order of the British Empire in the 1991 New Year Honours. In 2001, he was awarded the Gold Bauhinia Star by the government of Hong Kong.

In the 2005 Queen's Birthday Honours, he was made a Knight Bachelor by the United Kingdom for his contributions to British education. He also has honorary doctorates from the University of Cambridge, Imperial College London, the University of Hong Kong and the Chinese University of Hong Kong. Li was awarded the Grand Bauhinia Medal in 2007.

== See also ==
- Bank of East Asia
- Legislative Council of Hong Kong

Legislative Council of Hong Kong
New constituency	Member of Legislative Council; Representative for Finance; 1985–1997	Replaced by Provisional Legislative Council
New parliament	Member of Provisional Legislative Council; 1997–1998	Replaced by Legislative Council
New parliament	Member of Legislative Council; Representative for Finance; 1998–2012	Succeeded by Ng Leung-sing
Business positions
Preceded by Li Fook-wo	Chairman of the Bank of East Asia; 1997–present	Incumbent
Order of precedence
Preceded by Rita Fan; Recipient of the Grand Bauhinia Medal	Hong Kong order of precedence Recipient of the Grand Bauhinia Medal	Succeeded by Andrew Li; Recipient of the Grand Bauhinia Medal
