= Ryan Ip =

Surveyor from Hong Kong, China

Ryan Ip Man Ki
- Chinese: 葉文祺
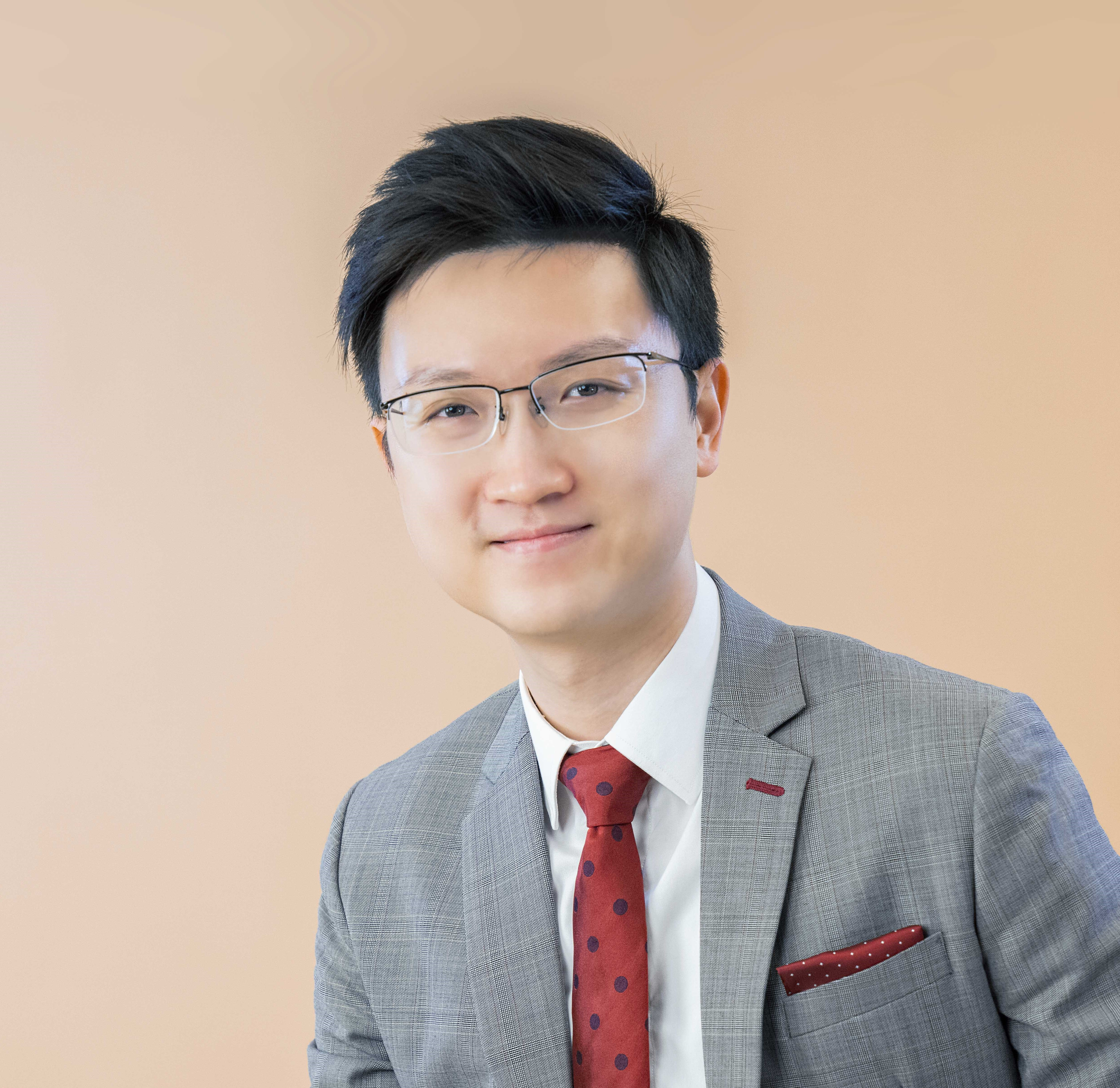
- Education: Chinese University of Hong Kong (Bec.); London School of Economics (MSc)
- Occupations: Surveyor; public policy advisor
- Title: Vice President and Executive Director of Public Policy Institute at Our Hong Kong Foundation
- Board member of: China Merchants Land; Town Planning Board; Hong Kong Maritime and Port Board; Hong Kong Proptech Association
- Awards: RICS Young Surveyor of the Year, Hong Kong 2020

Ryan Ip Man Ki (Chinese: 葉文祺) is a chartered surveyor and public policy advisor. He is the Vice President and Executive Director of the Public Policy Institute at Our Hong Kong Foundation, a non-profit think tank founded by the former Chief Executive of Hong Kong Tung Chee-hwa. He is also an independent non-executive director of China Merchants Land Limited, and a member of the Town Planning Board. He was named the Young Surveyor of the Year by the Royal Institution of Chartered Surveyors at its Hong Kong Awards 2020.

== Education and career ==
Ip graduated from the Chinese University of Hong Kong with first-class honours. He then received a Master of Science in Economics from the London School of Economics and Political Science. He joined Our Hong Kong Foundation in January 2017 and is the vice president of the foundation and executive director of its Public Policy Institute. Before joining Our Hong Kong Foundation, he was an economist at Hong Kong Monetary Authority and JLL. In May 2023, He was appointed as an independent non-executive director by China Merchants Land Limited, a Hong Kong-listed property development subsidiary of the state-owned China Merchants Group, and is the company's youngest independent director.

Ip is a frequent commentator of Hong Kong's real estate market and public policy in local and international media.

=== Public service ===
In April 2024, Ip was appointed by the Hong Kong Government as a member of the Town Planning Board and Hong Kong Maritime and Port Board. He was appointed a board member of the Estate Agents Authority in November of the same year. In December 2025, he was appointed as a member of the newly established Tourism Strategy Committee. He is also a member of the Advisory Committee on the Northern Metropolis, and the Land and Development Advisory Committee of the Hong Kong Government. He is also a vice president of the China Real Estate of Chamber of Commerce Hong Kong and International Chapters, and a board member of the Hong Kong Proptech Association.
