= Legislative Council of Hong Kong =

Unicameral legislature of Hong Kong

Legislative Council of the Hong Kong Special Administrative Region 香港特別行政區立法會
- 8th Legislative Council

Type
- Type: Unicameral

History
- Founded: 26 June 1843; 183 years ago (colonial); 25 January 1997; 29 years ago (provisional); 1 July 1998; 28 years ago (HKSAR)
- Preceded by: Provisional Legislative Council

Leadership
- President: Starry Lee, DAB since 8 January 2026
- House Committee Chairman: Ronick Chan, Independent since 12 January 2026
- Secretary General: Dora Wai, Independent since 1 August 2024

Structure
- Seats: 90
- Political groups: Pro-Beijing (89): DAB (20); BPA (8); FTU (7); Liberal (4); FEW (4); NPP (3); KWND (3); FLU (2); Roundtable (1); PP (1); PS (1); NTAS (1); Independent (34); Vacant (1)

Elections
- Voting system: Multiple non-transferable vote (EC); First-past-the-post (FCs); Single non-transferable vote (GCs)
- First general election: 24 May 1998
- Last general election: 7 December 2025
- Next general election: 2029

Meeting place
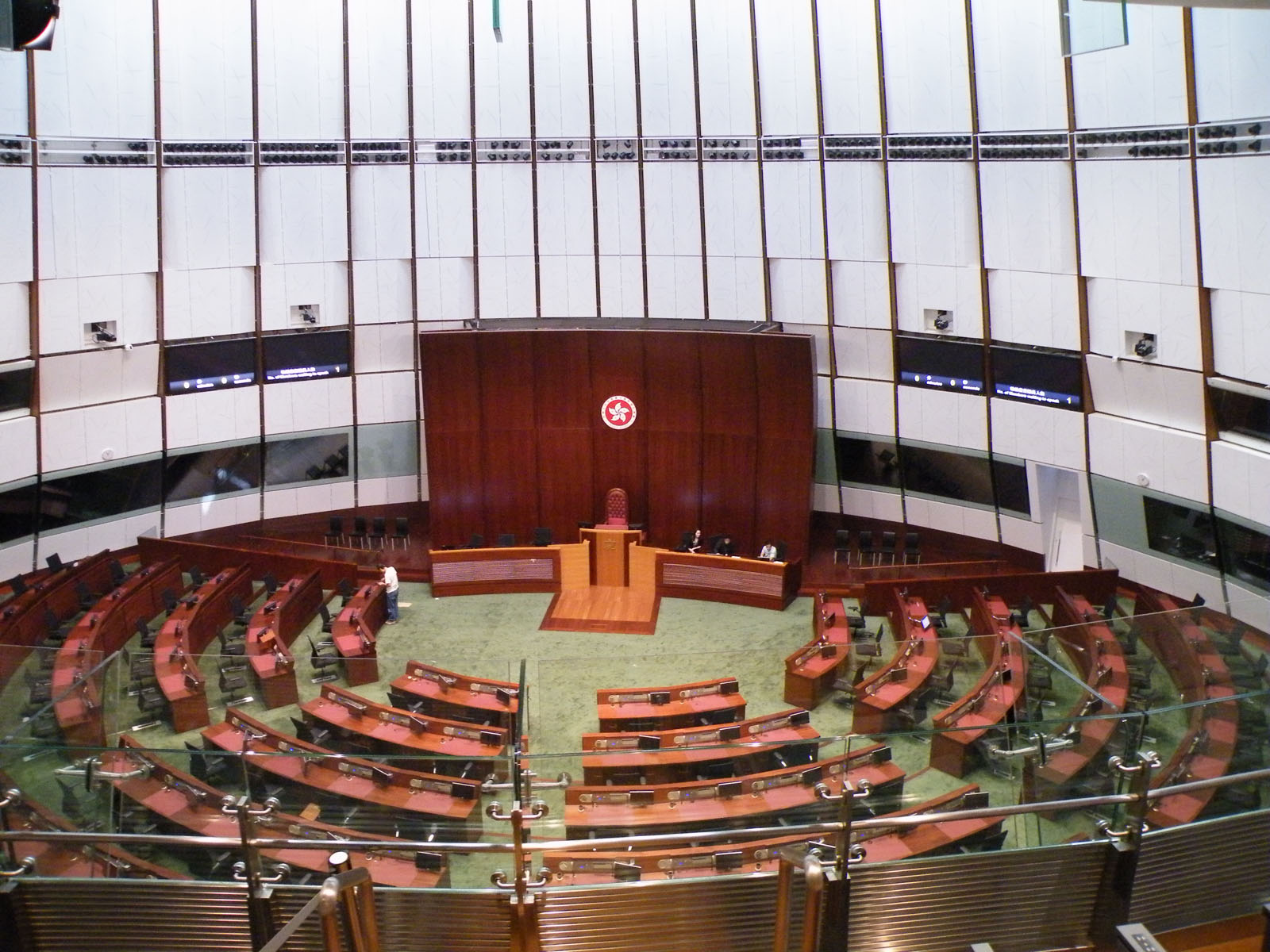
- Legislative Council Complex, 1 Legislative Council Road, Tamar, Central & Western District, Hong Kong

Website
- legco.gov.hk

Constitution
- Basic Law of Hong Kong and the Constitution of the People's Republic of China

Legislative Council of Hong Kong
- The Legislative Council Complex since 2011
- Traditional Chinese: 香港特別行政區立法會
- Simplified Chinese: 香港特别行政区立法会
Transcriptions
Standard Mandarin
- Hanyu Pinyin: Xiānggǎng Tèbiéxíngzhèngqū Lìfǎhuì
- Bopomofo: ㄒㄧㄤ ㄍㄤˇ ㄊㄜˋ ㄅㄧㄝˊ ㄒㄧㄥˊ ㄓㄥˋ ㄑㄩ ㄌㄧˋ ㄈㄚˇ ㄏㄨㄟˋ
- Wade–Giles: Hsiang^{1}-kang^{2} Tʻe^{4}-pieh^{2} Hsing^{2}-cheng^{4}-chʻü^{1} Li^{4}-fa^{3} Hui^{4}
- Tongyong Pinyin: Sianggǎng Tè-bié-síng-jhèng-cyu Lì-fǎ-huèi
- IPA: [ɕjáŋ.kàŋ tʰɤ̂.pjě.ɕǐŋ.ʈʂə̂ŋ.tɕʰý lî.fà.xwêɪ]
Yue: Cantonese
- Yale Romanization: Hēung góng dahk biht hàhng jing kēui laahp faat wúih
- Jyutping: hoeng1 gong2 dak6 bit6 hang4 zing3 keoi1 lap6 faat3 wui6
- IPA: [hœŋ˥ kɔŋ˧˥ tɐk̚˨ pit̚˨ hɐŋ˩ tsɪŋ˧ kʰɵɥ˥ lɐp̚˨ fat̚˧ wuj˨]

Legislative Council
- Traditional Chinese: 立法會
- Simplified Chinese: 立法会
Transcriptions
Standard Mandarin
- Hanyu Pinyin: Lìfǎhuì
- Bopomofo: ㄌㄧˋ ㄈㄚˇ ㄏㄨㄟˋ
- Wade–Giles: Li^{4}-fa^{3}-hui^{4}
- Tongyong Pinyin: Lì-fǎ-huèi
- IPA: [lî.fà.xwêɪ]
Yue: Cantonese
- Yale Romanization: Laahp faat wúih
- Jyutping: laap6 faat3 wui5
- IPA: [lɐp̚˨ fat̚˧ wuj˨]

Name before 1997
- Chinese: 立法局
Transcriptions
Standard Mandarin
- Hanyu Pinyin: Lìfǎjú
- Bopomofo: ㄌㄧˋ ㄈㄚˇ ㄐㄩˊ
- Wade–Giles: Li^{4}-fa^{3}-chü^{2}
- Tongyong Pinyin: Lì-fǎ-jyú
- IPA: [lî.fà.tɕy̌]
Yue: Cantonese
- Yale Romanization: Laahp faat guhk
- Jyutping: laap6 faat3 guk6
- IPA: [lɐp̚˨ fat̚˧ kʊk̚˨]

The Legislative Council of the Hong Kong Special Administrative Region, colloquially known as LegCo, is the unicameral legislature of Hong Kong. It follows China's "one country, two systems" constitutional arrangement, and is the legislative branch of Hong Kong's hybrid regime, though popular representation in the legislature has diminished since the 2020 Hong Kong national security law.

The historical Legislative Council of Hong Kong in the British colonial era was created under the 1843 Charter as an advisory council to the Governor. The authority of the colonial legislature expanded throughout its history. A parallel Provisional Legislative Council was established by China in 1997 to pass laws through the Hong Kong handover until the 1998 election. Following the 2019–2020 Hong Kong protests, the National People's Congress disqualified several opposition councillors and initiated an electoral overhaul in 2021. The current Legislative Council consists of three groups of constituencies—geographical constituencies (GCs), functional constituencies (FCs), and Election Committee constituencies—and has been dominated by the pro-Beijing camp since an opposition walkout in 2020. The 2021 changes resulted in a drop in the share of directly elected representatives from 50% to 22% and an increase in the overall number of seats from 70 to 90, along with the establishment of a screening committee to vet candidates. Since 2021, it is widely considered to be a rubber-stamp legislature due to the lack of opposition representatives and its frequent passing of laws with minimal discussion.

The functions of the Legislative Council are to enact, amend or repeal laws; examine and approve budgets, taxation and public expenditure; and raise questions on the work of the government. In addition, the Legislative Council has the power to endorse the appointment and removal of the judges of the Hong Kong Court of Final Appeal and the Chief Judge of the High Court, as well as the power to impeach the Chief Executive of Hong Kong. The original two groups (GCs and FCs) had constitutional significance. Government bills requires a simple majority of the council for passage, whereas private member bills requires simple majorities in two discrete divisions of geographical members and functional members for passage.

== History ==
=== Colonial period ===
The Legislative Council of Hong Kong was set up in 1843 for the first time as a colonial legislature under British rule. Hong Kong's first constitution, in the form of Queen Victoria's letters patent, issued on 27 June 1843 and titled the Charter of the Colony of Hong Kong, authorised the establishment of the Legislative Council to advise the Governor of Hong Kong's administration. The council had four official members including the governor who was president of the council when it was first established. The Letters Patent of 1888, which replaced the 1843 charter, added the significant words "and consent" after the words "with the advice". The Legislative Council was initially set up as the advisory body to the governor, and for most of the time, consisted half of official members, who were the government officials seated in the council, and half of unofficial members who were appointed by the Governor.

After the Sino-British Joint Declaration was signed on 19 December 1984 (in which the United Kingdom agreed to the handover of Hong Kong to the People's Republic of China on 1 July 1997), the Hong Kong government decided to start the process of democratisation based on the consultative document, Green Paper: the Further Development of Representative Government in Hong Kong on 18 July 1984.

The first elections to the Council were held in 1985, followed by the first direct elections of the Legislative Council held in 1991. The Legislative Council became a fully elected legislature for the first time in 1995 and extensively expanded its functions and organisations throughout the last years of the colonial rule.

The People's Republic of China government did not agree with reforms to the Legislative Council enacted by the last Governor Chris Patten in 1994. Therefore, it withdrew the previous so-called "through-train" policy that would have allowed for members elected to the colonial Legislative Council automatically becoming members of the Hong Kong Special Administrative Region (HKSAR) legislature. Instead, the Beijing government resolved to set up an alternative legislative council in preparation for the return of Hong Kong sovereignty from Britain to China.

Before the 1997 handover of Hong Kong, rather than working through the 1995 elected colonial legislature, the government of China, through the Preparatory Committee for the Hong Kong Special Administrative Region (HKSAR), unilaterally established, in 1996, the Provisional Legislative Council (PLC) in Shenzhen, under the National People's Congress of the People's Republic of China.

The Provisional Legislative Council, seen as unconstitutional by the British authorities and boycotted by most pro-democracy legislators, was in operation from 25 January 1997 to 30 June 1998 and held its meetings in Shenzhen until 30 June 1997, when the PLC moved to Hong Kong and replaced the elected legislature from the 1997 handover of Hong Kong until the 1998 Hong Kong legislative election. Since 2000, the terms of the Legislative Council have been four years, with the exception of the 6th Legislative Council.

=== Early SAR years ===
The current HKSAR Legislative Council was established on 1 October 1998 under the Hong Kong Basic Law. The first meeting of the council was held in July of the same year. Five subsequent Legislative Council elections have been held — the most recent being held on 4 September 2016. The Democratic Party had briefly held the largest-party status in the early years of the SAR period, but its support was slowly eaten away by its pro-democracy allies such as The Frontier and later the Civic Party. In the 2004 election, the pro-Beijing Democratic Alliance for the Betterment of Hong Kong (DAB) surpassed the Democrats as the largest party for the first time and has since held its superior status. Due to the indirectly elected trade-based functional constituencies which largely favour business interests — represented by the Liberal Party and subsequently the Business and Professionals Alliance for Hong Kong (BPA) — the pro-Beijing camp has been able to keep the majority in the legislature despite receiving fewer votes than the pro-democracy bloc in the direct elections.

Article 68 of the Hong Kong Basic Law states that the ultimate aim is the election of all the members of the Legislative Council by universal suffrage. This and a similar article dealing with election of the Chief Executive have made universal suffrage for the council and the Chief Executive a dominant issue in Hong Kong politics.

In 2010, the government's constitutional reform proposal became the first and only constitutional move to have been passed by the Legislative Council in the SAR era with the support of the Democratic Party after the Beijing government accepted the modified package as presented by the party, which increased the composition of the Legislative Council from 60 to 70 seats; adding five seats in the directly elected geographical constituencies and five new District Council (Second) functional constituency seats which are nominated by the District Councillors and elected by all registered electorates. The 2014 Hong Kong electoral reform proposal, which suggested the electoral method of the Legislative Council remain unchanged, was vetoed in 2015, after a massive occupation protest demanding universal suffrage — often dubbed the "Umbrella Revolution" — broke out in 2014.

The 2016 New Territories East by-election and September general election saw the rise of localist tide where a number of pro-independence candidates were elected to the council. In November, in Beijing's fifth interpretation of the Basic Law since the 1997 handover, the National People's Congress Standing Committee (NPCSC) disqualified two pro-independence legislators from assuming public office pursuant to Article 104. Four more pro-democracy and localist legislators were unseated in subsequent court cases. Returning officers also disqualified certain candidates who had advocated for Hong Kong self-determination, with or without option for independence, from running in the following by-elections; the government expressed support for such decisions.

=== National security overhaul ===
The 2019 amendment of the extradition bill caused a historic political upheaval, where intensive protests erupted throughout the city in the latter half of the year, including the storming of the Legislative Council Complex on the 22nd anniversary of the handover of Hong Kong on 1 July. In July 2020, in light of the pro-democrats' attempt to seize the majority of the Legislative Council in the midst of the largely unpopular Carrie Lam government, the government postponed the seventh general election, citing the COVID-19 spike. At variance with the four-year term set out in the Basic Law, the NPCSC decided in August that the sitting Legislative Council should continue with its duties for at least one year; however, the term of the upcoming LegCo would remain four years. The NPCSC disqualified four LegCo members, impacting sitting legislators whose candidacies had been invalidated in the postponed election. After the disqualification, the 15 remaining pro-democracy legislators announced their resignation in protest, leaving the legislature with virtually no opposition.

On 27 January 2021, CCP general secretary Xi Jinping said that Hong Kong could only maintain its long-term stability and security by ensuring "patriots governing Hong Kong" when he reviewed a work report delivered by Carrie Lam. In March 2021, China's National People's Congress passed a resolution that authorised an overhaul of Hong Kong's electoral system, including that of the Legislative Council. The reform would allow a new Candidate Eligibility Review Committee, composed entirely of principal officials from the Hong Kong government, to vet candidates for the Legislative Council and would increase its total number of seats from 70 to 90. However, the seats that were directly elected would be reduced from 35 to 20, the five directly elected District Council (Second) seats would also be removed, while an additional 40 seats would be elected by the pro-Beijing Election Committee and 30 seats would remain trade-based functional constituencies. Every candidate must have nominations from each of the five sectors in the Election Committee.

The 7th Legislative Council term, beginning in January 2022 and the first after the China-imposed reform, was criticised for lacking meaningful debates. A survey in 2023 found that half of Hongkongers were unable to name any serving lawmaker, with another 12% naming somebody not a current lawmaker. The council also fast-tracked multiple legislations including national security ordinance. In addition, at least 66% of bills passed were done with less than half of all Legislative Council members present, below the 50% attendance threshold for a quorum. The Chinese national emblem was installed in the chamber above the Hong Kong emblem for the first time.

== Functions ==
The functions of the Legislative Council are to enact, amend or repeal laws; examine and approve budgets, taxation and public expenditure; and raise questions on the work of the government. In addition, the Legislative Council has the power to endorse the appointment and removal of the judges of the Hong Kong Court of Final Appeal and the Chief Judge of the High Court, as well as the power to impeach the Chief Executive of Hong Kong.

== The Legislative Council Building ==
Past meeting venues of the Legislative Council

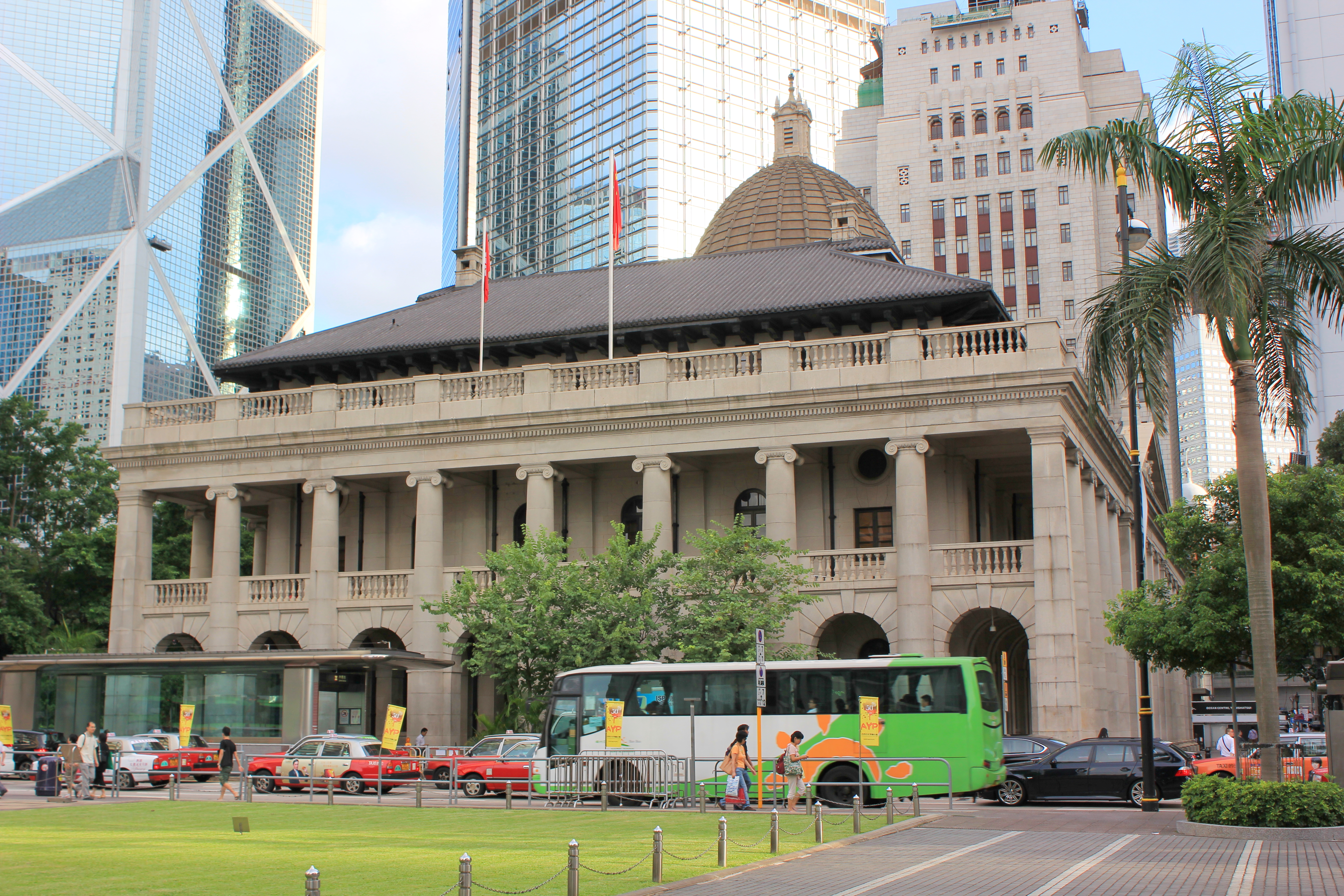
The Legislative Council Building, 1985–2011

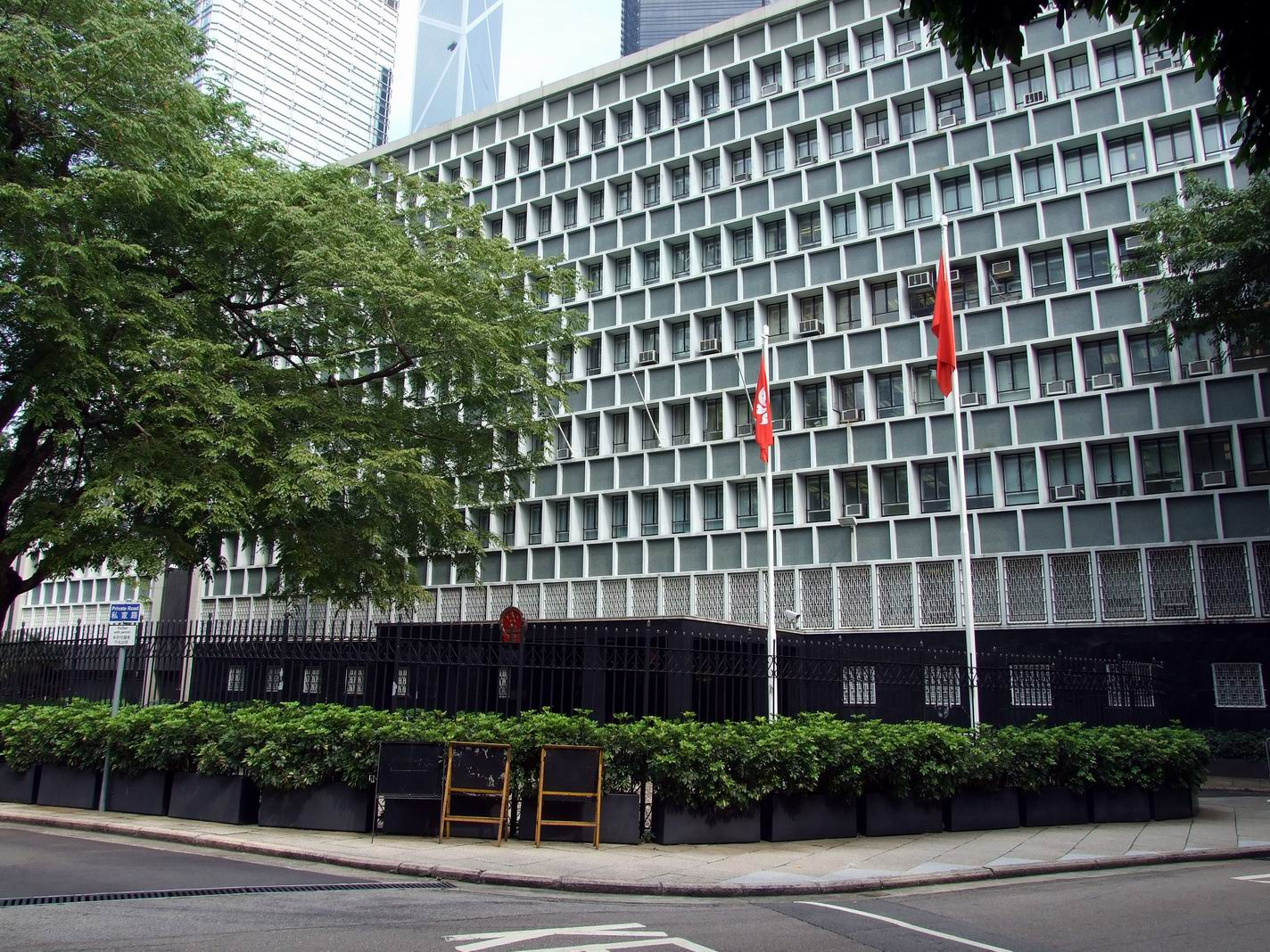
Central Government Offices, 1950s–1985

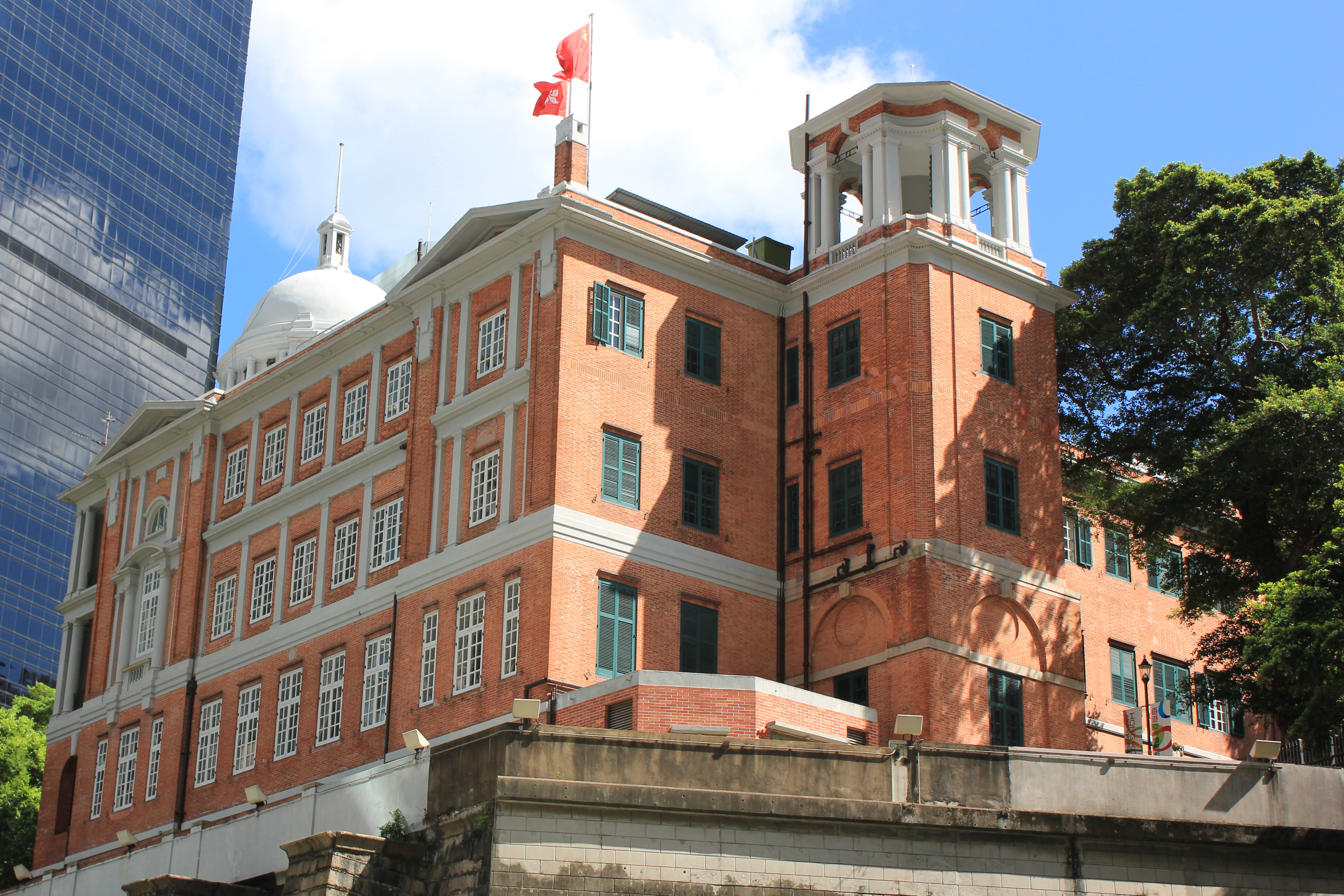
French Mission Building, in 1840s

The first meetings of the Legislative Council of Hong Kong, from 1844 to 1846, were likely convened in the residence of Governor Pottinger (later to be the French Mission Building), still standing at Government Hill. From 1848 to 1954 (interrupted by renovation in 1928-9 and the Japanese occupation in 1941–5), it was housed on the upper floor of the Colonial Secretariat Building, Lower Albert Road, replaced in 1957 by the Annex to the Central Government Offices Main Wing, on the same site. In 1985, LegCo moved down to the nearby Old Supreme Court building (22°16′52″N 114°09′36″E) in Central Hong Kong where it remained until November 2011. It took up residence in its present accommodation at the Legislative Block of the Central Government Complex, Tamar in December 2011.

Unlike many other former and current Commonwealth legislatures, the Hong Kong Legislative Council does not have a ceremonial mace placed in its chambers. However, the high courts of Hong Kong use a mace to open sessions, and it represents the authority and powers of the court.

To provide a long-term solution to the space shortage problem facing both the Government and the Legislative Council, the Government commissioned the Tamar Development for the design and construction of the Central Government Complex, the Legislative Council Complex and other ancillary facilities in 2008. The Legislative Council Complex comprises a low block and a high block: the low block, which will be named the Council Block, mainly houses conference facilities including the Chamber, major conference rooms, and communal facilities such as library, cafeteria and education facilities. The range of education facilities for visit by the public includes video corner, visitors' sharing area, exhibition area, children's corner, viewing gallery and access corridors, memory lane, education activities rooms and education galleries. The high block, which will be named as the Office Block, mainly houses offices for members and staff of the Legislative Council Secretariat. Officially opened on 1 August 2011, administrative staff had already taken occupation on 15 January 2011.

== Membership composition ==
Changes to the composition of the Legislative Council: 2016 composition (70 seats) Directly elected geographical constituencies (35) Nominated by District Councillors, directly elected District Council (Second) functional constituency (5) Indirectly elected trade-based functional constituencies (30) 2021 composition (90 seats) Directly elected geographical constituencies (20) Indirectly elected trade-based functional constituencies (30) Reintroduced Election Committee constituency (40)

Under the 2021 Hong Kong electoral changes initiated by the National People's Congress, the Legislative Council is now composed of 90 members returned from 3 constituencies: the Election Committee Constituency, Functional Constituencies and Geographical Constituencies by popular vote.

Composition of the Legislative Council (2022-)
	No. of Members	Returned by	Voting Method	No. of Voters (2021)
Election Committee Constituency	40	Members of the Election Committee	Plurality block voting	1,448
Functional Constituencies	30	Members of specified associations or professions	First-past-the-post voting / Plurality block voting	210,675 (individual voters); 8,579 (body voters)
Geographical Constituencies	20	Direct elections	Single non-transferable vote	4,472,863

The term of office of a member is constitutionally four years except for the first term (1998 to 2000) which was set to be two years according to Article 69 of the Basic Law. An exception was the 6th Legislative Council's term of office of over five years from 2016 to 2021.

In both the 2008 and 2004 elections, 30 members were directly elected by universal suffrage from geographical constituencies (GCs) and 30 were elected from functional constituencies (FCs). In the 2000 election, 24 were directly elected, six elected from an 800-member electoral college known as the Election Committee of Hong Kong, and 30 elected from FCs. Since the 2004 election, all the seats are equally divided between geographical and functional constituencies.

According to The Basic Law, while the method for forming the Legislative Council shall be specified in accordance with the principle of gradual and orderly progress, the ultimate aim is to elect all Council members by universal suffrage (Article 68 of The Basic Law of Hong Kong). However, under the 2021 overhaul, the seats that were directly elected would be reduced from 35 back down to 20, the five directly elected District Council (Second) seats would also be removed, while an additional 40 seats would be elected by the Beijing-controlled Election Committee and 30 seats would remain trade-based functional constituencies, reducing the proportion of directly elected seats from 50% to 22%. Additionally all candidates must now be approved by the HKSAR government via the Candidate Eligibility Review Committee. This has led to all parties that are not pro-Beijing declining to run in the elections, as it is now reasonable to assume that any pro-democracy candidates fielded that might be electable will be disqualified prior to the election.

Capacity	Constituency	Portrait	Elected Members	Elected Party	Political Alignment	Born	Occupation(s)	Assumed Office
President of the Legislative Council
GC	Kowloon Central		Starry Lee	DAB	Pro-Beijing	13 March 1974	Accountant; Legislative Councillor	2008
Other members
GC	New Territories North East		Chan Hak-kan	DAB/NTAS	Pro-Beijing	24 April 1976	Legislative Councillor	2008
ECC	Election Committee		Priscilla Leung	BPA/KWND	Pro-Beijing	18 November 1960	Professor; Barrister-at-law	2008
ECC	Election Committee		Steven Ho	DAB	Pro-Beijing	30 November 1979	Legislative Councillor	2012
ECC	Election Committee		Chan Han-pan	DAB/NTAS	Pro-Beijing	1975	Legislative Councillor	2012
ECC	Election Committee		Elizabeth Quat	DAB	Pro-Beijing	23 December 1966	Legislative Councillor	2012
FC	Industrial (Second)		Jimmy Ng	BPA	Pro-Beijing	17 June 1969	Company Director	2016
ECC	Election Committee		Junius Ho	Independent	Pro-Beijing	4 June 1962	Solicitor	2016
GC	New Territories North West		Holden Chow	DAB/NTAS	Pro-Beijing	7 June 1979	Solicitor	2016
FC	Wholesale and Retail		Shiu Ka-fai	Liberal	Pro-Beijing	22 April 1970	Company Director	2016
FC	Finance		Chan Chun-ying	Independent (G19)	Pro-Beijing	1961	Advisor	2016
FC	Heung Yee Kuk		Kenneth Lau	BPA	Pro-Beijing	1966	Company vice-chairman	2016
GC	Kowloon West		Vincent Cheng	DAB	Pro-Beijing	18 July 1979	Legislative Councillor	2018 (b)
ECC	Election Committee		Hoey Simon Lee	Independent (G19)	Pro-Beijing	1977	Chief Strategy Officer	2022
FC	Financial Services		Robert Lee	Independent (G19)	Pro-Beijing	1980	Company Director	2022
GC	New Territories North East		Dominic Lee	NPP/CF	Pro-Beijing	22 January 1984	Company Director	2022
ECC	Election Committee		Lee Chun-keung	Liberal	Pro-Beijing	22 August 1984	Legislative Councillor; Engineer; Manager	2022
GC	Hong Kong Island East		Stanley Ng	FTU	Pro-Beijing	1970	Trade unionist	2022
ECC	Election Committee		Johnny Ng	Independent	Pro-Beijing	1974	Company Director	2022
FC	Labour		Chau Siu-chung	FLU	Pro-Beijing	1970	Trade unionist	2022
FC	Medical and Health Services		David Lam	Independent	Pro-Beijing	1966	Surgeon	2022
ECC	Election Committee		Lam Chun-sing	FLU	Pro-Beijing	1981	Trade Unionist	2022
ECC	Election Committee		Nixie Lam	DAB	Pro-Beijing	13 March 1982	Legislative Councillor; Board member	2022
ECC	Election Committee		Andrew Lam	Independent	Pro-Beijing	1961	Company Chairman	2022
FC	Technology and Innovation		Duncan Chiu	Independent (G19)	Pro-Beijing	1974	Merchant	2022
ECC	Election Committee		Yiu Pak-leung	Independent (G19)	Pro-Beijing	11 March 1974	Chairman of China Travel Service (Hong Kong)	2022
ECC	Election Committee		Dennis Leung	FTU	Pro-Beijing	6 October 1973	Legislative Councillor	2022
GC	Kowloon West		Leung Man-kwong	KWND	Pro-Beijing	3 August 1984	Legislative Councillor	2022
ECC	Election Committee		Rock Chen	DAB	Pro-Beijing	6 June 1966	Investment Manager	2022
FC	Insurance		Chan Pui-leung	Independent (G19)	Pro-Beijing	1959	Legislative Councillor; China Taiping Insurance (HK) General Manager	2022
FC	HKSAR members of NPC and CPPCC, Representatives of National Organisations		Chan Yung	DAB/NTAS	Pro-Beijing	6 June 1966	Hong Kong Deputies to National People's Congress; Legislative Councillor; Social Worker	2022
FC	Textiles and Garment		Sunny Tan	BPA	Pro-Beijing	1973	Legislative Councillor; Senior Advisor	2022
GC	Hong Kong Island West		Judy Chan	NPP	Pro-Beijing	4 April 1980	Legislative Councillor	2022
ECC	Election Committee		Maggie Chan	Independent (G19)	Pro-Beijing	3 February 1969	Solicitor	2022
ECC	Election Committee		Chan Siu-hung	Independent	Pro-Beijing	1958	Engineer; Legislative Councillor	2022
ECC	Election Committee		Chan Hoi-yan	Independent	Pro-Beijing	19 November 1977	Legislative Councillor; Company Director	2022
GC	New Territories South West		Joephy Chan	FTU	Pro-Beijing	16 December 1989	Trade Unionist	2022
GC	Hong Kong Island West		Chan Hok-fung	DAB	Pro-Beijing	1976	Banker	2022
ECC	Election Committee		Kingsley Wong	FTU	Pro-Beijing	1968	Party chairman	2022
GC	Kowloon Central		Yang Wing-kit	Independent	Pro-Beijing	1968	Legislative Councillor	2022
ECC	Election Committee		Peter Douglas Koon	Independent	Pro-Beijing	2 December 1965	Clergyman	2022
FC	Education		Tang Fei	FEW	Pro-Beijing	Unknown	Legislative Councillor	2022
GC	Kowloon East		Tang Ka-piu	FTU	Pro-Beijing	29 October 1979	Legislative Councillor; Community practitioner	2022
ECC	Election Committee		Lau Chi-pang	FEW	Pro-Beijing	1960	Professor	2022
FC	Sports, Performing Arts, Culture and Publication		Kenneth Fok	Independent (G19)	Pro-Beijing	2 July 1979	Merchant	2022
ECC	Election Committee		Carmen Kan	Independent (G19)	Pro-Beijing	1968	Solicitor; General Counsel of bank	2022
FC	Commercial (Third)		Erik Yim	Independent (G19)	Pro-Beijing	1972	Business Executive; Hong Kong Maritime and Port Development Board member	2022
ECC	Election Committee		Adrian Ho	NPP	Pro-Beijing	1977	Legislative Councillor	2022 (b)
ECC	Election Committee		Chan Wing-kwong	DAB	Pro-Beijing	1963	Chinese Medicine Practitioner; Legislative Councillor	2022 (b)
ECC	Election Committee		William Wong (Note: Resigned on 3 July 2026 over drink-driving and hit-and-run.)	Independent	Pro-Beijing	1960	Professor	2022 (b)
FC	Engineering		Aaron Bok	BPA	Pro-Beijing		Legislative Councillor	2026
GC	New Territories South East		Christine Fong	PP	Pro-Beijing		Legislative Councillor; Engineer	2026
ECC	Election Committee		Ginny Man	Independent	Pro-Beijing		Solicitor	2026
ECC	Election Committee		Chu Lap-wai	DAB/HKIF	Pro-Beijing		Legislative Councillor	2026
FC	Tourism		Vivian Kong	Independent	Pro-Beijing		Legislative Councillor	2026
ECC	Election Committee		Ng Wun-kit	Independent	Pro-Beijing		School principal Legislative Councillor	2026
ECC	Election Committee		Wu Yingpeng	Independent (G19)	Pro-Beijing		Barrister; Lawyer (China)	2026
FC	Accountancy		Webster Ng	Independent	Pro-Beijing		Legislative Councillor; Public accountant Tax adviser	2026
ECC	Election Committee		Elvin Lee	Independent (G19)	Pro-Beijing		Cultural Enterprise Management	2026
FC	Labour		Lee Kwong-yu	FTU	Pro-Beijing		Consultant	2026
FC	Commercial (First)		Jonathan Lamport	BPA	Pro-Beijing		Merchant	2026
FC	Labour		Lam Wai-kong	FTU	Pro-Beijing		District Councillor; Trade unionist	2026
FC	Transport		Lothair Lam	Independent (G19)	Pro-Beijing		Company chairman	2026
FC	Commercial (Second)		Andrew Yao	Independent (G19)	Pro-Beijing		Company chairman	2026
GC	New Territories North		Yiu Ming	DAB	Pro-Beijing		Legislative Councillor	2026
ECC	Election Committee		Alex Fan	Independent	Pro-Beijing		Barrister; Hainan International Arbitration Court president Lawyer (China); Adjunct professor	2026
ECC	Election Committee		Andrew Fan	Independent	Pro-Beijing		Public Accountants	2026
ECC	Election Committee		Hung Kam-in	DAB	Pro-Beijing			2026
FC	Social Welfare		Grace Chan	Independent	Pro-Beijing		Hong Kong Council of Social Service Chief Executive	2026
ECC	Election Committee		Alan Chan	Independent	Pro-Beijing		Chief Operations Officer	2026
ECC	Election Committee		Chan Cho-kwong	Independent	Pro-Beijing		Legislative Councillor; Media president	2026
FC	Agriculture and Fisheries		Chan Pok-chi	DAB	Pro-Beijing		Legislative Councillor	2026
FC	Legal		Nick Chan	Liberal	Pro-Beijing		Lawyer	2026
GC	New Territories South West		Kwok Fu-yung	DAB	Pro-Beijing		Legislative Councillor; District Councillor	2026
ECC	Election Committee		Albert Chuang	Independent (G19)	Pro-Beijing		Merchant	2026
GC	New Territories North West		Chong Ho-fung	Roundtable	Pro-Beijing		Legislative Councillor	2026
GC	Kowloon East		Cheung Pui-kong	DAB	Pro-Beijing		Legislative Councillor	2026
FC	Catering		Jonathan Leung	Liberal	Pro-Beijing		Legislative Councillor	2026
FC	Industrial (First)		Ray Wong	BPA	Pro-Beijing		Legislative Councillor; Innovative industrialist	2026
FC	Real Estate and Construction		Augustine Wong	Independent	Pro-Beijing		Henderson Land Development Executive Director	2026
ECC	Election Committee		Ken Wong	FEW	Pro-Beijing		School principal	2026
GC	Hong Kong Island East		Elaine Chik	DAB	Pro-Beijing		Legislative Councillor	2026
GC	New Territories South East		Chris Ip	DAB	Pro-Beijing		Company director	2026
FC	Architectural, Surveying, Planning and Landscape		Julia Lau	Independent	Pro-Beijing		Architect	2026
ECC	Election Committee		Lau Ka-keung	Independent (G19)	Pro-Beijing		Management	2026
ECC	Election Committee		Michelle Tang	BPA	Pro-Beijing		Civil engineer District Councillor	2026
FC	Import and Export		Tommy Chung	Independent (G19)	Pro-Beijing		Legislative Councillor	2026
ECC	Election Committee		Michael Ngai	Independent	Pro-Beijing		Businessman	2026
GC	New Territories North		Tam Chun-kwok	NTAS	Pro-Beijing		Legislative Councillor	2026
ECC	Election Committee		Thomas So	Independent	Pro-Beijing		Solicitor	2026

=== Geographical constituencies ===
The Geographical Constituency (GC) seats are returned by universal suffrage. 20 seats of the Legislative Council are returned by GCs through single non-transferable vote with a district magnitude of 2 ("binomial system"). The binomial system was instituted by the Standing Committee of the National People's Congress in its amendment to Annex 2 of the Basic Law on 30 March 2021.

Geographical constituency	Number of voters	Number of seats	Voting system
Hong Kong Island East	424,849	2	Single non-transferable vote
Hong Kong Island West	374,795	2	Single non-transferable vote
Kowloon East	475,223	2	Single non-transferable vote
Kowloon West	381,484	2	Single non-transferable vote
Kowloon Central	454,595	2	Single non-transferable vote
New Territories South East	472,751	2	Single non-transferable vote
New Territories North	431,604	2	Single non-transferable vote
New Territories North West	468,752	2	Single non-transferable vote
New Territories South West	510,558	2	Single non-transferable vote
New Territories North East	478,252	2	Single non-transferable vote

Geographical constituencies were first introduced in Hong Kong's first legislative election with direct elections in 1991. The electoral system and boundaries of GCs have since changed:

Election Year	Voting system	Number of constituencies	District magnitude	Total number of GC seats	Proportion of LegCo seats
1991	Plurality-at-large	9 constituencies	2 seats	18 seats	29.5%
1995	First-past-the-post voting	20 constituencies	1 seat	20 seats	33.3%
1998	Proportional representation (Largest remainder method: Hare quota)	5 constituencies	3-9 seats	20 seats	33.3%
2000	Proportional representation (Largest remainder method: Hare quota)	5 constituencies	3-9 seats	24 seats	40%
2004	Proportional representation (Largest remainder method: Hare quota)	5 constituencies	3-9 seats	30 seats	50%
2008	Proportional representation (Largest remainder method: Hare quota)	5 constituencies	3-9 seats	30 seats	50%
2012	Proportional representation (Largest remainder method: Hare quota)	5 constituencies	3-9 seats	35 seats	50%
2016	Proportional representation (Largest remainder method: Hare quota)	5 constituencies	3-9 seats	35 seats	50%
2021	Single non-transferable vote	10 constituencies	2 seats	20 seats	22.2%

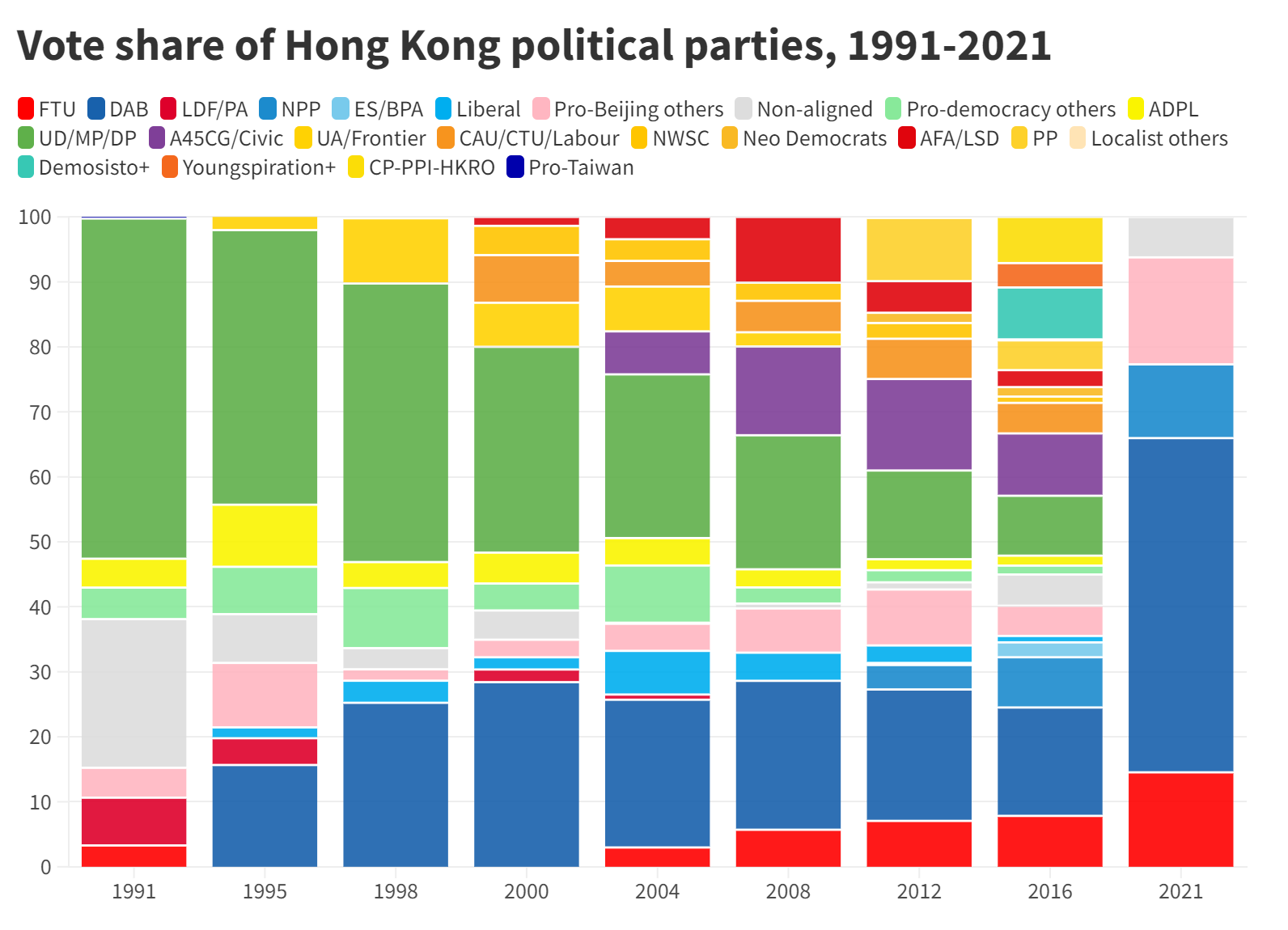
Vote share of Hong Kong political parties, 1991–2021

Between 1998 and 2016, the voting system adopted in GCs is a system of party-list proportional representation, with seats allocated by the largest remainder method using the Hare quota as the quota for election.

Geographical constituencies	No. of Seats					
Geographical constituencies	1998	2000	2004	2008	2012	2016
Hong Kong Island	4	5	6	6	7	6
Kowloon East	3	4	5	4	5	5
Kowloon West	3	4	4	5	5	6
New Territories East	5	5	7	7	9	9
New Territories West	5	6	8	8	9	9
Total	20	24	30	30	35	35

=== Functional constituencies ===
Under the 2021 Hong Kong electoral changes, 28 functional constituencies (FC) return 30 members. The Labour Functional Constituency returns three members by block voting. The other FCs return one member each with first-past-the-post voting.

Before the 2021 elections, the Heung Yee Kuk, Agriculture and Fisheries, Insurance, and Transport FCs where a preferential elimination system is used due to the small number of voters. In the preferential elimination system, a voter must indicate preferences rather than approval/disapproval or a single choice. District Council (Second) uses the same voting rule in Geographical constituencies for the 5 seats. Neither the Heung Yee Kuk nor the Commercial (Second) FCs have held an actual election, as only one candidate has stood for each FC in every election since their establishment in 1991 and 1985, respectively.

Following the 2021 reform, Functional constituencies are now principally elected by body votes; the number of FCs with individual votes were reduced, together with elimination of mixed individual and body voting systems. Competitions were also seen in all constituencies between pro-Beijing candidates.

Registered voters in the functional constituencies of Hong Kong in 2021
Functional constituency		Number of registered electors		
Functional constituency		Bodies	Individuals	Total
1	Heung Yee Kuk		161	161
2	Agriculture and Fisheries	176		176
3	Insurance	126		126
4	Transport	223		223
5	Education		85,117	85,117
6	Legal		7,549	7,549
7	Accountancy		27,778	27,778
8	Medical and Health Services		55,523	55,523
9	Engineering		10,772	10,772
10	Architectural, Surveying and Planning		9,123	9,123
11	Labour	697		697
12	Social Welfare		13,974	13,974
13	Real Estate and Construction	463		463
14	Tourism	192		192
15	Commercial (First)	1,041		1,041
16	Commercial (Second)	421		421
17	Commercial (Third)	288		288
18	Industrial (First)	421		421
19	Industrial (Second)	592		592
20	Finance	114		114
21	Financial Services	760		760
22	Sports, Performing Arts, Culture and Publication	257		257
23	Import and Export	231		231
24	Textiles and Garment	348		348
25	Wholesale and Retail	2,015		2,015
26	Technology and Innovation	73		73
27	Catering	141		141
28	HKSAR members of NPC and CPPCC, representatives of national organisations		678	678
Total		8,579	210,675	219,254

=== Election Committee Constituency ===
The Election Committee constituency was one of the three constituencies designed in the Basic Law of Hong Kong next to the directly elected geographical constituencies and the indirectly elected functional constituencies for the first and second-term Legislative Council in the early SAR period. With the last British Governor Chris Patten's electoral reform, the ECC was composed of all elected District Board members who had been elected in 1994. The Single Transferable Vote system was used in the 1995 election.

After the handover of Hong Kong, the ECC was allocated 10 seats out of the total 60 seats in the SAR Legislative Council, comprising all members of the Election Committee which also elected the Chief Executive every five years. The size of the constituency reduced to six seats in 2000 and was entirely abolished and replaced by the directly elected geographical constituency seats in the 2004 election. The plurality-at-large voting system was used in 1998 and 2000.

In the 2021 electoral overhaul, the Election Committee constituency was reintroduced, taking 40 of the 90 seats, almost half, of the Legislative Council with plurality-at-large voting system. The electorate is composed of all newly expanded 1,500 members in the Election Committee.

== Committee system ==
Committees perform LegCo's functions of scrutinizing bills, approving public expenditure and monitoring Government's work. There are several types of committees, with most committees additionally divided into subcommittees. The chairman of each committee is elected by the committee from among its members.

=== Standing Committees ===
There are three standing committees. which have the power to summon any person to give evidence and produce documents.

- Finance Committee
  - Establishment Subcommittee
  - Public Works Subcommittee
- Public Accounts Committee
- Committee on Members' Interests

=== Other committees ===
- House Committee
  - Parliamentary Liaison Subcommittee
- Committee on Rules of Procedure
- Committee on Access to the Legislature's Documents and Records
- Investigation committees
- Bills committees
- Select committees
- Panels

==== Panels ====
The 18 panels monitor and examine government policy, and provide a forum for lawmakers to deliberate on policy matters. A panel may appoint a subcommittee to study a specific issue and report to the panel.

- Panel on Administration of Justice and Legal Services
- Panel on Commerce and Industry
- Panel on Constitutional Affairs
- Panel on Development
- Panel on Economic Development
- Panel on Education
- Panel on Environmental Affairs
- Panel on Financial Affairs
- Panel on Food Safety and Environmental Hygiene
- Panel on Health Services
- Panel on Home Affairs
- Panel on Housing
- Panel on Information Technology and Broadcasting
- Panel on Manpower
- Panel on Public Service
- Panel on Security
- Panel on Transport
- Panel on Welfare Services

== President of the Legislative Council ==
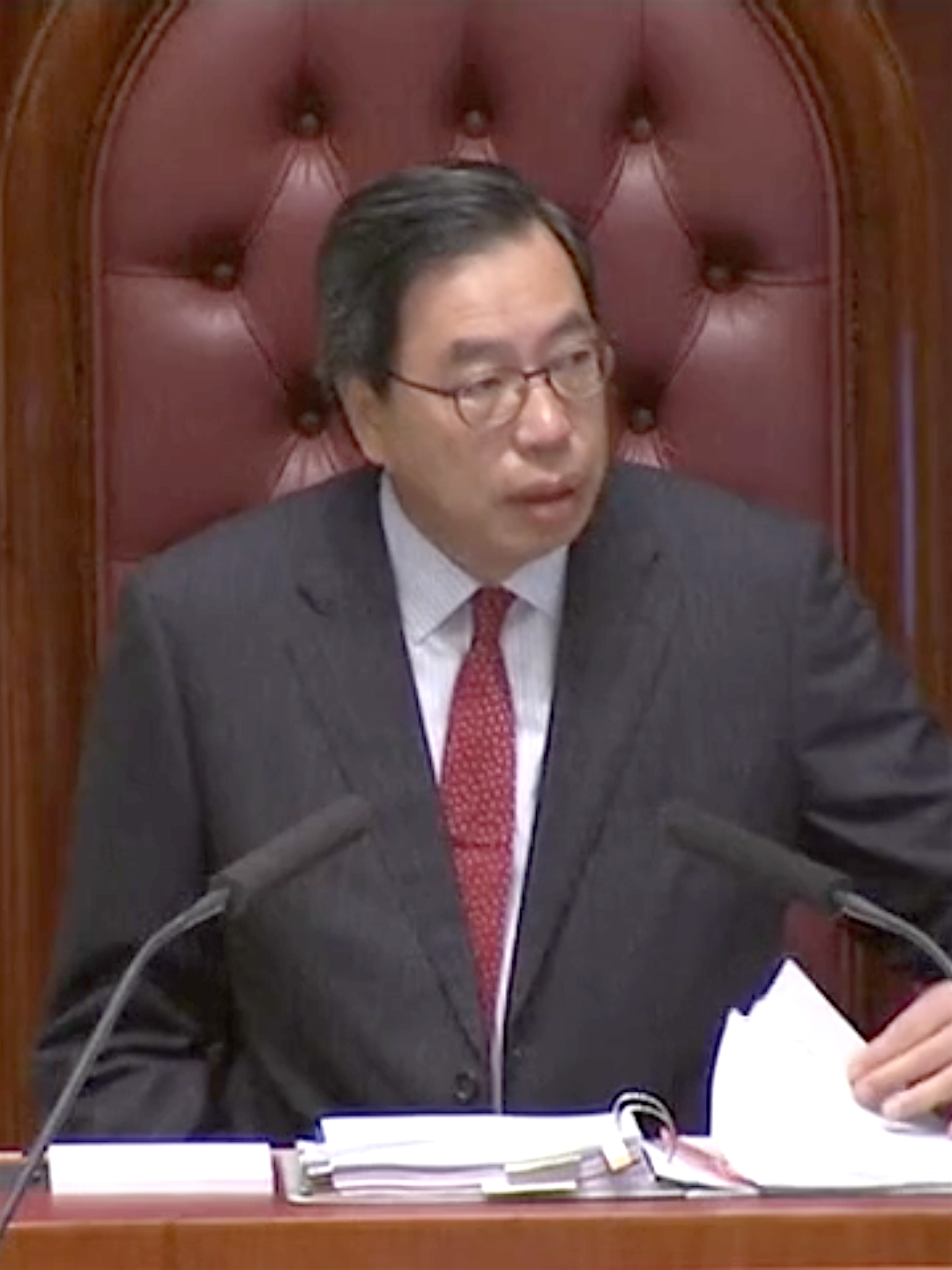
Andrew Leung, the President of the Legislative Council from 2016 to 2025.

From the establishment of the Legislative Council in 1843 to 1993, the Governor was the President and a member of the council, and until 1917 the Governor was required to act with the advice but not necessary the consent of the Legislative Council. The Letters Patent of 1917 changed such practice by requiring the Governor to act "with advice and consent" of the Legislative Council.

Under the Basic Law (Article 72), the President has the powers and functions to preside over meetings, decide on the agenda, including giving priority to government bills for inclusion in the agenda, decide on the time of meetings, call special sessions during the recess, call emergency sessions on the request of the Chief Executive, and exercise other powers and functions as prescribed in the rules of procedure of the Legislative Council. However, the president of the legislative council may not vote in most situations regarding government bills, and is encouraged to remain impartial towards all matters in the LegCo. The President of the Legislative Council has to meet the eligibility requirements set out in the Basic Law that he or she shall be a Chinese citizen of not less than 40 years of age, who is a permanent resident of the HKSAR with no right of abode in any foreign country and has ordinarily resided in Hong Kong for a continuous period of not less than 20 years.

The President is elected by and from among Council members. The first President (1997–2008) was Rita Fan; the most recent president, elected in 2026, is Starry Lee of the pro-Beijing Democratic Alliance for the Betterment and Progress of Hong Kong.

=== Primacy of President ===
In a controversial move directed at reining in democratic legislators (most of whom were elected by universal suffrage and six of whose seats had been vacated by a controversial court order of disqualification), amendments to the Rules of Procedure were passed on 15 December 2017 giving sweeping powers to the President to control the business of the legislature. Among them is the power to vet proposed motions and amendments to bills, require legislators to explain them and to reject or merge them. Prior notice must be given of any notice of motion and the President may reconvene the chamber immediately after any failure to meet quorum.

== Procedure ==
The quorum for meetings of the council is half of all LegCo Members; while the quorum for meetings of a committee of the whole during second reading of bills is 20, i.e. only 22 per cent of membership, having been reduced from 35 on 15 December 2017.

After the 15 December 2017 amendments to procedure, a petition is to be submitted to the House Committee only with at least 35 signatures of members, effectively blocking democrat-sponsored scrutiny of government action.

=== Passage of Bills ===
Passage of bills introduced by the government require only a simple majority of votes of the members of the Legislative Council present; whereas passage of motions, bills or amendments to government bills introduced by individual LegCo members shall require a simple majority of votes of each of the two groups of members present: namely members returned by the Election Committee and members returned by functional constituencies and geographical constituencies.

Motions on amendments to the Basic Law require a two-thirds vote in the Legislative Council, without a specific requirement in each group of constituencies. After passing the council, the Basic Law amendment must obtain the consent of two-thirds of Hong Kong's deputies to the National People's Congress, and also the Chief Executive (the Chief Executive is vested with the veto power). The National People's Congress reserves the sole power to amend the Basic Law.

Traditionally, the President does not vote. However, this convention is not a constitutional requirement. In 2024 the President broke with convention and voted yes for the Safeguarding National Security Bill.

==== List of government defeats ====
Since the handover, the pro-Beijing bloc has retained the majority of Legislative Council and thus government bills are rarely defeated in the Legislative Council except the following:

- Registration of Same-sex Partnerships Bill: the second reading of the bill was defeated 14–71 (with 1 abstention) on 10 September 2025. While the government was backed by Executive Council members and the New People's Party, 71 pro-Beijing conservative members decided not to support the bill.
- Motion Concerning the Amendment to the Method for the Selection of the Chief Executive of the Hong Kong Special Administrative Region (the 2015 electoral reform): the motion was defeated 8–28 without reaching the two-thirds majority on 18 June 2015.
- Marriage (Amendment) Bill 2014: the second reading of the bill was defeated 11–40 (with 5 abstentions) on 22 October 2014. 20 pro-democratic members rejected the bill as too harsh to transgender citizens, while the other 20 pro-Beijing conservatives said the bill is not in line with Hong Kong's traditional values.
- Motion "The Amendment to the Method for the Selection of the Chief Executive" and "The Amendment to the Method for the Formation of the Legislative Council" (the 2005 electoral reform): both motions were defeated 34–24 (with 1 abstain) without reaching the two-thirds majority on 21 December 2005.

== Elections of the Legislative Council ==
Legislative Council general elections are held every four years in accordance with Article 69 of the Basic Law of HKSAR. The most recent election was held on 7 December 2025. The pro-Beijing camp had absolute control of the Legislative Council with the Democratic Alliance for the Betterment and Progress of Hong Kong (DAB) as the largest party.

== Seating arrangement ==
In a typical Council meeting in the old Legislative chamber, members were seated to the left and front of the President's chair in the Chamber patterned after the adversarial layout of Westminster system legislatures. The three rows to the right were reserved for government officials and other people attending the meetings.

At the new LegCo site at Tamar, members sit facing the President (and council officers) in a hemicycle seating arrangement.

== Legislative Council Secretariat ==
At present, the Secretariat, headed by the Secretary General, provides administrative support and services to the Council through its ten divisions. In addition to being the chief executive of the Secretariat, the Secretary General is also the Clerk to the Legislative Council responsible for advising the President on all matters relating to the procedure of the council.

== List of Legislative Council compositions ==
Composition of political bloc since 1985 election: Pro-Beijing camp Conservative camp (later merged into Pro-Beijing camp) Pro-democracy camp Localist groups Unaffiliated members Ex-officio members

The following lists the composition of Legislative Council seats since its establishment:

Number of seats in Legislative Council according to election method
	Officials (Note: Including the Governor.)	Appointed	Indirectly elected		Directly elected	Total
	Officials	Appointed	by Electoral College (inc. Election Committee)	by functional constituencies	Directly elected	Total
1843	4	–	–	–	–	4
1844	6	–	–	–	–	6
1845	4	–	–	–	–	4
1850	6	2	–	–	–	8
1857	6	3	–	–	–	9
1858	7	3	–	–	–	10
1868	6	4	–	–	–	10
1883	7	5	–	–	–	12
1896	8	6	–	–	–	14
1917	8	6	–	–	–	14
1928	10	8	–	–	–	18
1964	13	13	–	–	–	26
1972	15	15	–	–	–	30
1976	23	23	–	–	–	46
1977	25	25	–	–	–	50
1980	27	27	–	–	–	54
1983	29	29	–	–	–	58
1984	29	32	–	–	–	61
1985–88	11	22	12	12	–	57
1988–91	11	20	12	14	–	57
1991–95	4	18	–	21	18	61
1995–97	–	–	10	30	20	60
1997–98	–	–	60	–	–	60
1998–2000	–	–	10	30	20	60
2000–04	–	–	6	30	24	60
2004–12	–	–	–	30	30	60
2012–21	–	–	–	35	35	70
2021–29	–	–	40	30	20	90

The following chart lists the composition of the Legislative Councils of Hong Kong since the Special Administrative Region (SAR) period from 1998, the composition and diagram indicate the seats controlled by the camps (green for the pro-democracy camp and red for the pro-Beijing camp) at the beginning of the sessions.

Term (Election)	Diagram	Composition (by alignment)	President	DAB	BPA	FTU	Lib	NPP	DP	Civ
1st (1998)		20:40	Rita Fan (Independent)	9	–	–	10	–	13	–
2nd (2000)		21:39	Rita Fan (Independent)	11	–	–	8	–	12	–
3rd (2004)		25:35	Rita Fan (Independent)	12	–	1	10	–	9	–
4th (2008)		23:37	Jasper Tsang (DAB)	13	–	1	7	–	8	5
5th (2012)		27:1:42	Jasper Tsang (DAB)	13	–	6	5	2	6	6
6th (2016)		29:1:40	Andrew Leung (BPA)	12	7	5	4	3	7	6
7th (2021)		1:89	Andrew Leung (BPA)	19	7	8	4	5	–	–
8th (2025)		90	Starry Lee (DAB)	20	8	7	4	3	–	–

== Officers of the Legislative Council ==
Services to members were originally provided by the Office of the Clerk to the Legislative Council which was part of the Government Secretariat. Additional support later came from other administrative units, i.e. the Unofficial Members of the Executive and Legislative Councils (UMELCO) Secretariat and its variants, in consideration of the gradually rising volume of work in Council business.

With the establishment of UMELCO in 1963, public officers were seconded to UMELCO to assist members to deal with public complaints and build up public relations with the local community. During their secondments, public officers took instructions only from Council members. The practice remained when the Office of the Members of the Executive and Legislative Councils (OMELCO) replaced UMELCO in 1986.

In 1991, the OMELCO Secretariat was incorporated. As a result of the complete separation of membership of the Executive and Legislative Councils, OMELCO was renamed the Office of Members of Legislative Council (OMLEGCO).

The Legislative Council Commission, a statutory body independent of the Government, was established under The Legislative Council Commission Ordinance on 1 April 1994. The Commission integrated the administrative support and services to the council by the Office of the Clerk to the Legislative Council and the OMLEGCO Secretariat into an independent Legislative Council Secretariat. The Commission replaced all civil servants by contract staff in the 1994–1995 session.

== See also ==
- Commonwealth Association of Legislative Counsel
- Executive Council of Hong Kong
- Legislative Assembly of Macau
- List of Members of the Legislative Council of Hong Kong
- Politics of Hong Kong
- Senior Chinese Unofficial Member
- Senior Unofficial Member
