= Technology and Innovation functional constituency =

Hong Kong functional constituency

Technology and Innovation 科技創新界
- Functional constituency for the Legislative Council of Hong Kong
- Region: Hong Kong
- Electorate: 71

Current constituency
- Created: 2021
- Number of members: One
- Member: Duncan Chiu (Independent)
- Created from: Information Technology

The Technology and Innovation functional constituency (Chinese: 科技創新界功能界別) is a functional constituency in the elections for the Legislative Council of Hong Kong first created in 2021, replacing the Information Technology functional constituency. The constituency has the fewest electorate among all constituencies, composing only 73 designated bodies relating to technology and innovation, including 25 national level research platforms, 11 public organisations, and 41 academic organisations and professional bodies participating in government's consultation on the development of innovation and technology, as compared to the 12,091 registered voters in the previous Information Technology constituency.

== Return members ==
Election	Member	Party
2021	Duncan Chiu	Independent
2025	Duncan Chiu	Independent

== Electoral results ==
=== 2020s ===
2025 Legislative Council election: Technology and Innovation
Party	Candidate	Votes	%	±%
Independent	Duncan Chiu	65	91.55	+10.25
Independent	Mak Hin-yu	6	8.45	
Majority		59	83.10	
Total valid votes		71	100.00	
Rejected ballots		0		
Turnout		71	100.00	+1.37
Registered electors		71		
Independent hold		Swing		

2021 Legislative Council election: Technology and Innovation
Party	Candidate	Votes	%	±%
Independent	Duncan Chiu	59	83.10	
Independent	Wu Chili	12	16.90	
Majority		47	66.20	
Total valid votes		71	100.00	
Rejected ballots		1		
Turnout		72	98.63	
Registered electors		73		
Independent win (new seat)				
