= Commercial (Third) functional constituency =

Commercial (Third) 商界（第三）
- Functional constituency for the Legislative Council of Hong Kong
- Country: Hong Kong
- Electorate: 307

Current constituency
- Created: 2021
- Number of members: One
- Member: Erik Yim (Independent)

The Commercial (Third) functional constituency (Chinese: 商界（第三）功能界別) is a functional constituency in the elections for the Legislative Council of Hong Kong first created in 2021. Derived from the former Hong Kong Chinese Enterprises Association Subsector in the Election Committee, the constituency is composed of 288 corporate members of the Hong Kong Chinese Enterprises Association entitled to vote at general meetings of the Association.

== Return members ==
Election	Member	Party
2021	Erik Yim	Independent
2025	Erik Yim	Independent

== Electoral results ==
=== 2020s ===
2025 Legislative Council election: Commercial (Third)
Party	Candidate	Votes	%	±%
Independent	Erik Yim Kong	199	65.25	+3.98
DAB	Cheung Ki-tang	106	34.75	
Majority		93	30.50	
Total valid votes		305	100.00	
Rejected ballots		2		
Turnout		307	100.00	+1.04
Registered electors		307		
Independent hold		Swing		

2021 Legislative Council election: Commercial (Third)
Party	Candidate	Votes	%	±%
Independent	Erik Yim Kong	174	61.27	
Independent	Yau Wai-kwong	110	38.73	
Majority		64	22.54	
Total valid votes		284	100.00	
Rejected ballots		1		
Turnout		285	98.96	
Registered electors		288		
Independent win (new seat)				
