= Finance (constituency) =

Hong Kong functional constituency

Finance 金融界
- Functional constituency for the Legislative Council of Hong Kong
- Region: Hong Kong
- Electorate: 91

Current constituency
- Created: 1985
- Number of members: One
- Member: Chan Chun-ying (Independent)

Finance
- Traditional Chinese: 金融界功能界別
Transcriptions
Yue: Cantonese
- Yale Romanization: Gām yùhng gaai gūng nàhng gaai biht
- Jyutping: Gam1 jung4 gaai3 gung1 nang4 gaai3 bit6

The Finance functional constituency, formerly called the Financial functional constituency between 1985 and 1991, is a functional constituency in the elections for the Legislative Council of Hong Kong first created in 1985. It was one of the 12 original functional constituency seats created for the first ever Legislative Council election in 1985 and was divided into Finance and Financial Services in 1991. It has the fewest electorates among all constituencies, composing of 114 banks and deposit-taking companies as corporate electors.

Since its creation, it had held by David Li, chairman of the Bank of East Asia, uncontestedly with the exception of 2000 Legislative Council election which was the only election held in the constituency. Li retired from the office in 2012 and was replaced by Ng Leung-sing. Since 2016 until now, it has been represented by Chan Chun-ying, the former board secretary of the state-owned Bank of China (Hong Kong).

== Return members ==
Election	Member	Party
1985	David Li	Independent
1988	David Li	Independent
1991	David Li	Independent
1995	David Li	Independent
Not represented in the PLC (1997–1998)
1998	David Li	Independent
2000	David Li	Independent
2004	David Li	Independent
2008	David Li	Independent
2012	Ng Leung-sing	Independent
2016	Chan Chun-ying	Independent
2021	Chan Chun-ying	Independent
2025	Chan Chun-ying	Independent

== Electoral Results ==
=== 2020s ===
2025 Legislative Council election: Finance
Party	Candidate	Votes	%	±%
Independent	Chan Chun-ying	42	56.00	−19.00
Independent	Ip Tsz-kin	33	44.00	
Majority		9	12.00	
Total valid votes		75	100.00	
Rejected ballots		1		
Turnout		76	83.52	+10.89
Registered electors		91		
Independent hold		Swing		

2021 Legislative Council election: Finance
Party	Candidate	Votes	%	±%
Independent	Chan Chun-ying	51	75.00	
Independent	Owens Chan Chi-fai	17	25.00	
Majority		34	50.00	
Total valid votes		68	100.00	
Rejected ballots		1		
Turnout		69	72.63	
Registered electors		95		
Independent hold		Swing		

=== 2010s ===
2016 Legislative Council election: Finance
Party	Candidate	Votes	%	±%
Independent	Chan Chun-ying	Unopposed		
Registered electors		125		
Independent gain from Independent		Swing		

2012 Legislative Council election: Finance
Party	Candidate	Votes	%	±%
Independent	Ng Leung-sing	Unopposed		
Registered electors		128		
Independent hold		Swing		

=== 2000s ===
2008 Legislative Council election: Finance
Party	Candidate	Votes	%	±%
Independent	David Li Kwok-po	Unopposed		
Registered electors		140		
Independent hold		Swing		

2004 Legislative Council election: Finance
Party	Candidate	Votes	%	±%
Independent	David Li Kwok-po	Unopposed		
Registered electors		154		
Independent hold		Swing		

2000 Legislative Council election: Finance
Party	Candidate	Votes	%	±%
Independent	David Li Kwok-po	89	73.55	
Independent	Kung Lin-cheng	32	26.45	
Majority		57	47.10	
Total valid votes		121	100.00	
Rejected ballots		2		
Turnout		123	86.01	
Registered electors		143		
Independent hold		Swing		

=== 1990s ===
1998 Legislative Council election: Finance
Party	Candidate	Votes	%	±%
Independent	David Li Kwok-po	Unopposed		
Registered electors		207		
Independent hold		Swing		

1995 Legislative Council election: Finance
Party	Candidate	Votes	%	±%
Independent	David Li Kwok-po	Unopposed		
Registered electors		246		
Independent hold		Swing		

1991 Legislative Council election: Finance
Party	Candidate	Votes	%	±%
Independent	David Li Kwok-po	Unopposed		
Registered electors		234		
Independent hold		Swing		

=== 1980s ===
1988 Legislative Council election: Financial
Party	Candidate	Votes	%	±%
Independent	David Li Kwok-po	Unopposed		
Independent hold		Swing		

1985 Legislative Council election: Financial
Party	Candidate	Votes	%	±%
Independent	David Li Kwok-po	Unopposed		
Independent win (new seat)				
