= Ken Wong =

Hong Kong actor

Ken Wong Hoi-wai (Chinese: 王凱韋; born 1966 or 1967,) originally named Ken Wong Hap-hei (Chinese: 王合喜) is a former Hong Kong Olympic windsurfing team athlete who later became an entertainer. He is a former TVB actor and windsurfing coach.

== Biography ==
Wong was born in British Hong Kong, with ancestral roots in Dongguan, Guangdong. He attended the now-defunct Oberlin College (Shau Kei Wan branch) during his secondary school years, and was a former representative of windsurfing in Hong Kong.

He made his film debut in 1997 in Downtown Torpedoes; in 2005, he joined TVB and subsequently starred in several television dramas, including Women on the Run, Maidens' Vow, and The Seventh Day. He left TVB in 2009, and The Stew of Life was his last work.

Wong has two children.
