= Erik Yim =

Hong Kong politician

The Honourable Erik Yim
- 嚴剛
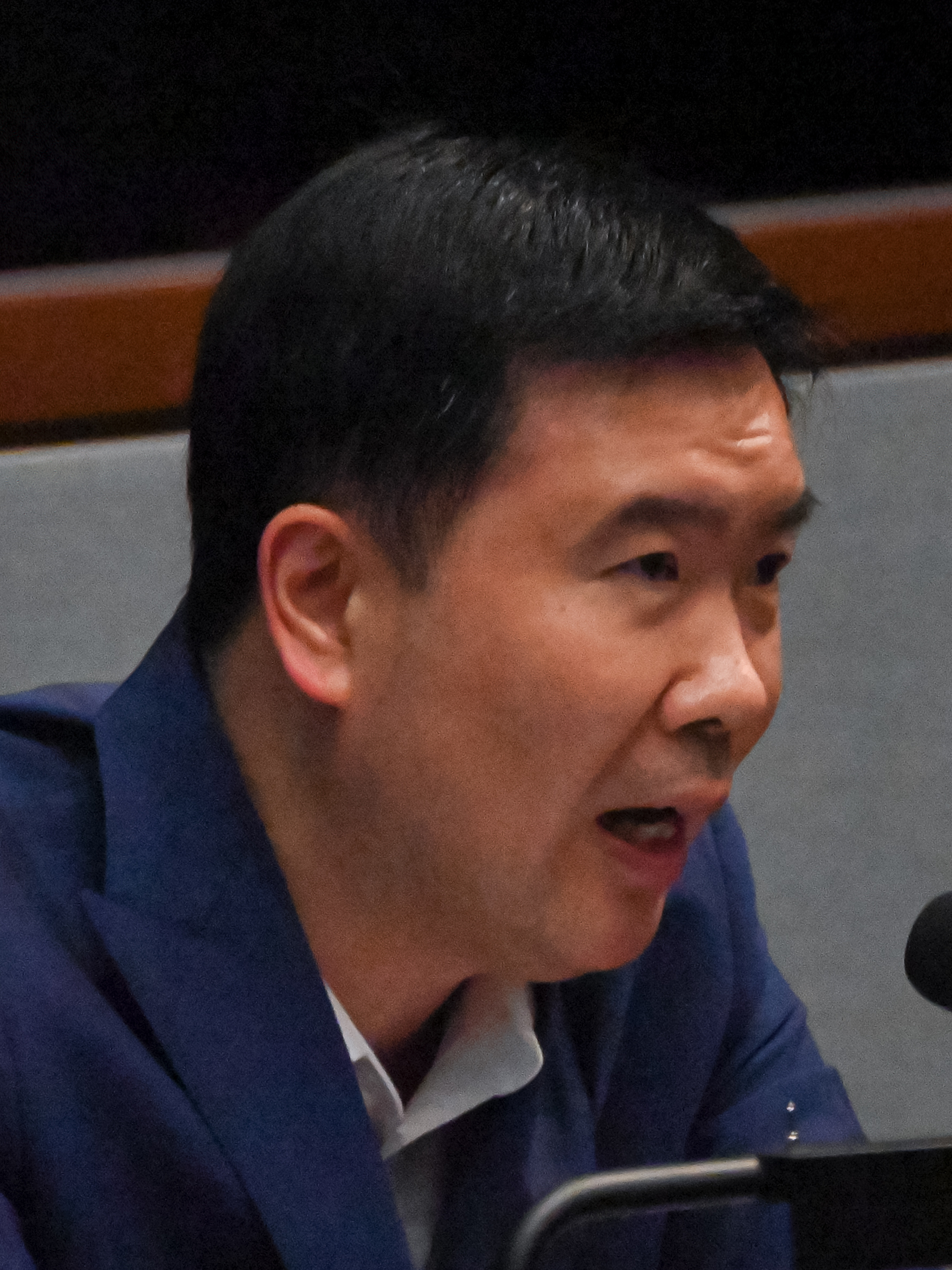
- Yim in 2023

Member of the Legislative Council
- Incumbent
- Assumed office 1 January 2022
- Preceded by: Constituency created
- Constituency: Commercial (Third)

Personal details
- Born: Yan Gang; May 1972 (age 54)
- Education: Xiamen University (BIT); Maastricht School of Management (MBA)

Erik Yim Kong (Chinese: 嚴剛; born May 1972) is a Hong Kong businessman and politician who is the chief operational officer and general manager of the China Merchants Port. In 2021, he was elected as the member of the Legislative Council for Commercial (Third) for the first time, a newly created functional constituency under the 2021 Hong Kong electoral changes. He was re-elected in 2025.

== Electoral history ==
2025 Legislative Council election: Commercial (Third)
Party	Candidate	Votes	%	±%
Independent	Erik Yim Kong	199	65.25	+3.98
DAB	Cheung Ki-tang	106	34.75	
Majority		93	30.50	
Total valid votes		305	100.00	
Rejected ballots		2		
Turnout		307	100.00	+1.04
Registered electors		307		
Independent hold		Swing		

2021 Legislative Council election: Commercial (Third)
Party	Candidate	Votes	%	±%
Independent	Erik Yim Kong	174	61.27	
Independent	Yau Wai-kwong	110	38.73	
Majority		64	22.54	
Total valid votes		284	100.00	
Rejected ballots		1		
Turnout		285	98.96	
Registered electors		288		
Independent win (new seat)				

Legislative Council of Hong Kong
New constituency	Member of Legislative Council; Representative for Commercial (Third); 2022–present	Incumbent
