= Duncan Chiu =

Hong Kong politician

The Honourable Duncan Chiu
- 邱達根
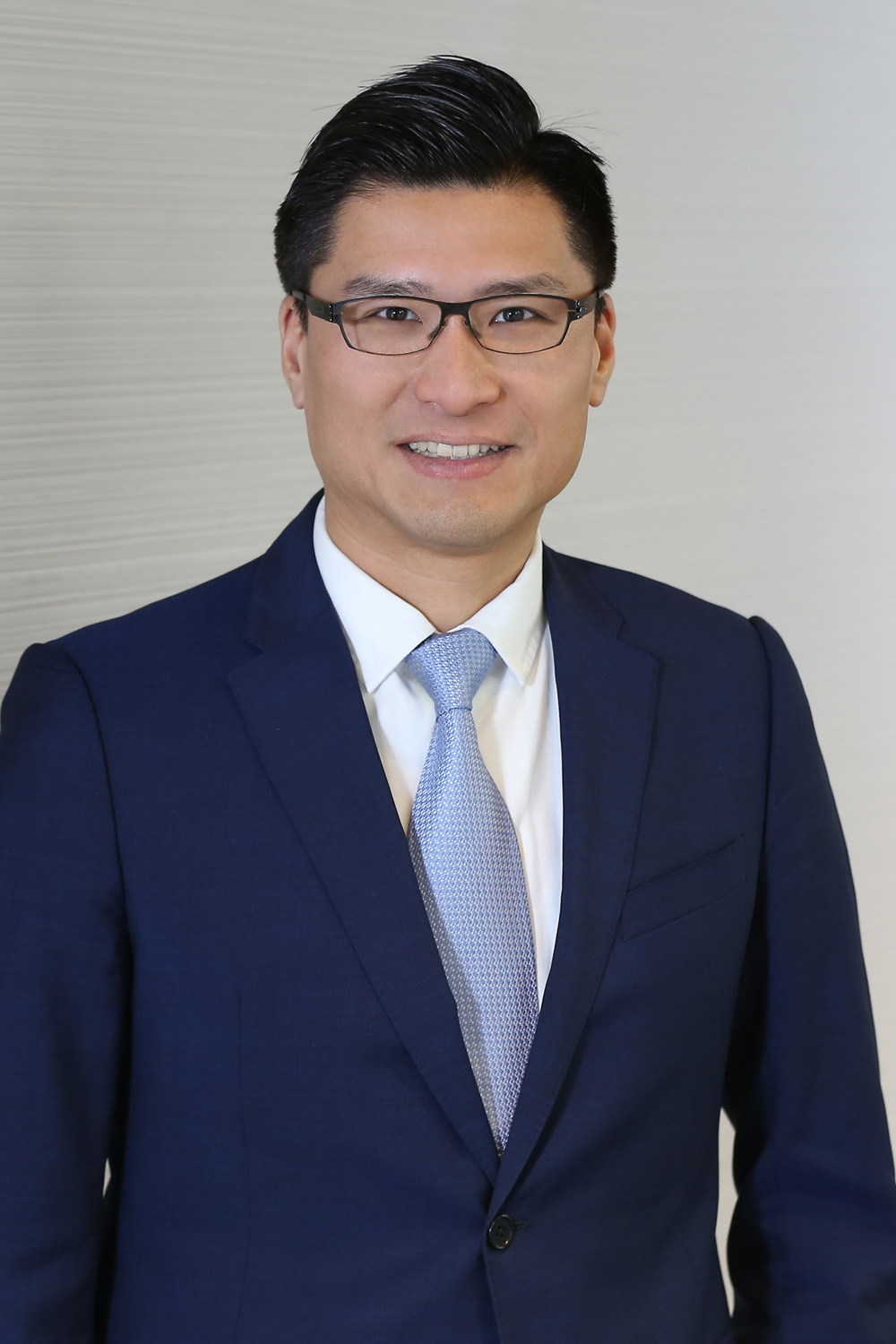
- Duncan Chiu

Member of the Legislative Council
- Incumbent
- Assumed office 1 January 2022
- Preceded by: Charles Mok (Information Technology)
- Constituency: Technology and Innovation

Personal details
- Born: 1974 (age 51–52)
- Education: Pepperdine University (BSc)

Duncan Chiu Tat-kun (born 1974, Chinese: 邱達根) is a Hong Kong politician serving as a member of the Legislative Council for the Technology and Innovation functional constituency since 2021. He is the youngest child of Hong Kong entrepreneur Deacon Chiu.

Chiu is the President of the Hong Kong Information Technology Joint Council (HKITJC) and the Convenor of Innovate for Future, a think tank representing some technology start-ups in Hong Kong. He is also the Chairman of HKTDC Information & Communications Technology (ICT) Services Advisory Committee and the Chairman of Information Technology Services Committee of the Hospital Authority. Chiu also serves as a chair at Hong Kong Squash.

On 5 January 2022, Carrie Lam announced new warnings and restrictions against social gathering due to potential COVID-19 outbreaks. One day later, it was discovered that Chiu attended a birthday party hosted by Witman Hung Wai-man, with 222 guests. At least one guest tested positive with COVID-19, causing many guests to be quarantined.

In October 2022, Chiu defended the government's decision to grant special COVID-19 exemptions to overseas guests attending the Global Financial Leaders' Investment Summit and Hong Kong FinTech Week, exemptions which will allow them to eat at restaurants and visit other venues when normal arrivals to Hong Kong are banned from eating at restaurants in their first 3 days after landing in the city. Chiu said "Participants of FinTech week and investment summit are all top talent who require special care."

In November 2023, he was part of a group of lawmakers who said that the 2023 Gay Games may infringe on the national security law.

In December 2025, he was re-elected as a member of Legislative Council.

== Property ==
According to Chiu's January 2022 declaration of assets, he owns land in Hong Kong and Japan, as well as property in Hong Kong, Japan, and the United Kingdom. Additionally, he owns shares in about 40 separate companies.

== Electoral history ==
2021 Legislative Council election: Technology and Innovation
Party	Candidate	Votes	%	±%
Nonpartisan	Duncan Chiu	59	83.10	
Nonpartisan	Wu Chili	12	16.90	
Majority		47	66.20	
Total valid votes		71		
Rejected ballots				
Turnout				
Registered electors		73		
Nonpartisan win (new seat)				

Legislative Council of Hong Kong
Preceded by Charles Mok (Information Technology)	Member of Legislative Council; Representative for Technology and Innovation; 2022–present	Incumbent
