= Chan Chun-ying =

Hong Kong banker and politician

The Honourable Chan Chun-ying
- 陳振英
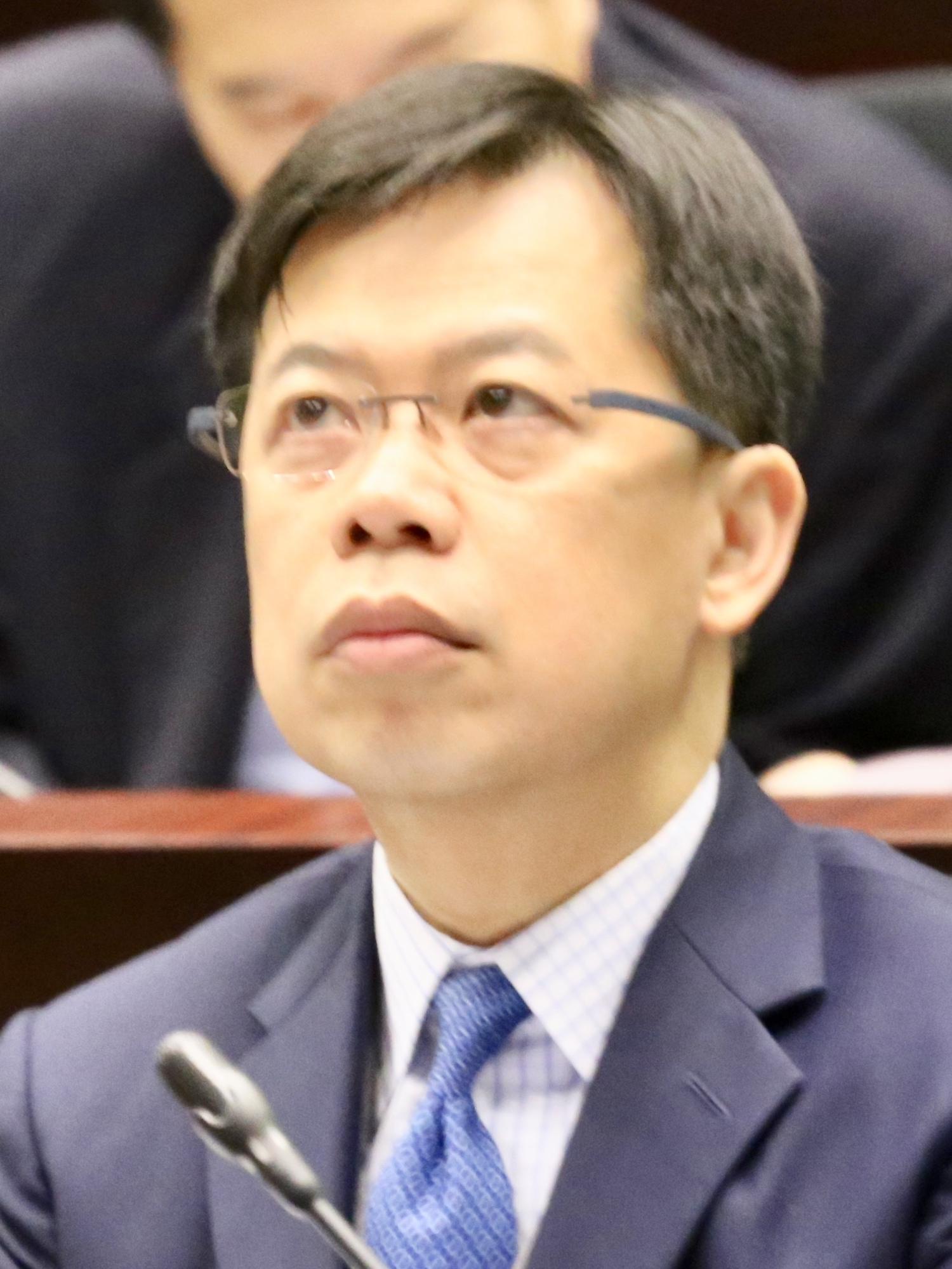

Member of the Legislative Council
- Incumbent
- Assumed office 1 October 2016
- Preceded by: Ng Leung-sing
- Constituency: Finance

Personal details
- Born: 1961 (age 64–65) Hong Kong
- Education: Northeast Louisiana University
- Occupation: Banker

Chan Chun-ying
- Traditional Chinese: 陳振英
Transcriptions
Yue: Cantonese
- Yale Romanization: Chàhn Jan yīng
- Jyutping: Can^{4} Zan^{3} jing^{1}

Ronick Chan Chun-ying (Chinese: 陳振英; born 1961) is a Hong Kong banker and politician. He was the board secretary and is now an advisor at Bank of China (Hong Kong) and the vice-chairman as well as Secretary General of the Chinese Banking Association of Hong Kong. In the 2016 Hong Kong Legislative Council election, he was elected without opposition in the Finance functional constituency for the Legislative Council of Hong Kong, representing the banking sector. He was elected in 2021 and 2025 through the same constituency.

== Biography ==
Chan was born and educated in Hong Kong. He received an MBA from Northeast Louisiana University in the United States. He started his career in a travel firm and entered banking in 1992, dealing with syndicated loans at Nanyang Commercial Bank before joining the Bank of China (Hong Kong). He went on to become the board secretary and company secretary of the BOC Hong Kong (Holdings) on 1 April 2011.

In 2016, Chan became the vice-chairman of the Chinese Banking Association of Hong Kong which was founded by 32 mainland banks with a presence in Hong Kong to spearhead banking policies and seek to create opportunities related to China's 13th five-year plan and One Belt One Road objectives.

In the 2016 Hong Kong Legislative Council election, he was elected without opposition in the Finance functional constituency for the Legislative Council of Hong Kong, replacing outgoing Ng Leung-sing to represent the banking sector. He was backed by his employer, Bank of China (Hong Kong), HSBC, Standard Chartered Bank, Citibank and Bank of East Asia.

In December 2021, Chan was re-elected through the same constituency with 51 votes.

In December 2022, Chan said that fundraising requests could move through the Legislative Council more quickly due to all lawmakers being "patriots," with no more dissent and filibustering.

In December 2025, Chan was re-elected through the same constituency with 42 votes, only 9 votes more than his opponent, IP Tsz Kin.

In January 2026, Chan lost to Starry Lee in the election of the president of Legislative Council by 5 votes. One week later, Chan was elected as the president of House Committee of Legislative Council.

Legislative Council of Hong Kong
Preceded by Ng Leung-sing	Member of Legislative Council; Representative for Finance; 2016–present	Incumbent
Order of precedence
Preceded by Pierre Chan; Member of the Legislative Council	Hong Kong order of precedence Member of the Legislative Council	Succeeded by Tanya Chan; Member of the Legislative Council
