= Hong Kong Maritime and Port Development Board =

Government body

- 香港海運港口發展局

Agency overview
- Formed: 1 July 2025
- Preceding agency: Hong Kong Maritime and Port Board
- Jurisdiction: Government of Hong Kong
- Agency executive: Moses Cheng, Chairman
- Website: Official website

Hong Kong Maritime and Port Development Board
- Traditional Chinese: 香港海運港口局
Transcriptions
Yue: Cantonese
- Yale Romanization: Hēung góng hói wahn góng háu guhk
- Jyutping: Heong^{1} gong^{2} hoi^{2} wan^{6} gong^{2} hau^{2} guk^{6}

The Hong Kong Maritime and Port Development Board (Chinese: 香港海運港口發展局) is a Hong Kong Government advisory body for maritime initiatives.

Its precursor could be traced back to Port Development Board (港口發展局), which was subsequently reorganised into Hong Kong Port and Maritime Board (香港港口及航運局) in June 1998 with new responsibilities to promote the shipping industry and develop international shipping centre. In 2003 the Board was divided into two bodies, the Hong Kong Port Development Council (香港港口發展局) and the Hong Kong Maritime Industry Council (香港航運發展局) , before merging back in April 2016 and renamed Hong Kong Maritime and Port Board (香港海運港口局). The move was welcomed by the maritime industry as signalling more support for them.

The Chief Executive announced in 2024 that the Board was renamed to the current name and upgraded to a "high‑level advisory body", responsible for assisting the Government in formulating policies and long‑term development strategies. It will strengthen the promotional work and step up manpower training, while promoting the sustainable development of the maritime industry. It was officially reconstituted on 1 July 2025, with unofficial member chairing the agency for the first time.

== Members ==
The board will be chaired by a non‑official member. Other members largely come from the maritime sector. Under the Board there are four committees: Port Development Committee, Maritime Services Development Committee, Promotion and External Relations Committee, and Manpower Development Committee.

=== Chairman ===
- Secretary for Transport (1998–2002)
- Secretary for Environment, Transport and Works (1998–2002)
- Secretary for Transport and Housing (July 2007 – June 2022)
- Secretary for Transport and Logistics (July 2022 – June 2025)
- Moses Cheng Mo-chi (July 2025 – )
