= Kenneth Fang =

Hong Kong businessman (1938–2022)

Dr Kenneth Fang GBS CBE JP
- 方鏗
- Born: November 20, 1938; Jiangsu, China
- Died: August 28, 2022 (aged 83); Hong Kong
- Education: University of Michigan Massachusetts Institute of Technology
- Occupations: Businessman, philanthropist
- Children: Katherine Fang (Daughter) Susanna Fang (Daughter) Jean Fang (Daughter) Douglas Fang (Son)
- Relatives: Vincent Fang (Brother)

Chinese name
- Chinese: 方鏗
Transcriptions

Kenneth Fang Hung GBS CBE JP (Chinese: 方鏗; November 20, 1938 - August 28, 2022) was a Hong Kong billionaire industrialist, politician, and philanthropist. He was known as the "King of Textiles".

== Early life ==
Fang was born on November 20, 1938, in Xiaohai Town, Nantong City, Jiangsu Province. He lived in Hong Kong from the 1950s onward. For his early education, he graduated from Pui Ching Secondary School in 1956. Fang received a Bachelor of Science from the University of Michigan and a Masters of Science in chemical engineering from the Massachusetts Institute of Technology.

== Family background ==
The Fang family with roots in Haimen, Nantong, Jiangsu, China has long had a prominent position in Hong Kong. They are deemed by Forbes as "the largest amongst the dozen-or-so of families that dominate Asia's textile industry".

Fang's father, Fang Shui Chow (Chinese: 方肇周), made his first fortune in the yarn trade in Shanghai. Fang Shui Chow later moved to Hong Kong on the eve of the Communist takeover in 1949, shipping hundreds of the most technologically advanced cotton spindles to the entrepôt before his arrival. He later founded S.C. Fang & Sons that same year, which became Hong Kong’s largest textile maker. He was regarded as one of the pioneers of Hong Kong's 20th century industrial boom. One of Fang's brothers is Vincent Fang, who inherited and was the chief executive of the Toppy Group, overseeing the family's multi-billion-dollar apparel retailing operations. He is also the former chairman & leader of the Liberal Party of Hong Kong, and a former member of the Legislative Council of Hong Kong.

== Career ==
=== Textile and apparel manufacturing ===
In the 1960s, Fang joined his father's textile-making business, S.C. Fang & Sons, for one year. Fang’s family was one of the largest holders under the textile quota system, which was in place throughout the second half of the 20th century and abolished in 2005. They held near-monopolistic control and investments in the textile industry.

Fang was best known for founding Fang Brothers Knitting Limited (Chinese: 肇豐針織) in 1965, which was the world's largest producer of knitwear and garments throughout the second half of the 20th century, and remains one of the largest. After shopping at name-brand department stores Jordan Marsh and Filene's during his studies at MIT, he saw the demand for simply constructed sweaters, which led him to manufacture knitwear on a private-label basis. As of 2002, Fang Brothers Knitting operated 25 factories in mainland China, Hong Kong, Thailand, Malaysia, Mexico, Honduras, the United States and the United Kingdom; employed over 25,000 workers; produced over 30 million pieces of high quality knitwear annually (also produced undocumented amounts of t-shirts, sweaters, and other garments). The firm supplied to companies including Ralph Lauren, Burberry, Brooks Brothers, J.Crew, and more.

Fang was widely regarded as the leader of Hong Kong's textile & garment industry for his contributions. Fang was credited with modernizing the industry by introducing Western production and business formats and employing vertical-integration practices. During the 1980s, he led and successfully defended Hong Kong against a case raised by the US Department of Commerce on a US Anti-Dumping Duty Order against MMF Sweaters from Hong Kong. In 1999, he chaired the Textiles and Garment Industry Revitalisation Committee and established a plan to strengthen Hong Kong’s position as a world fashion hub, which was implemented by the Hong Kong government in 2000. In 2001, he led the establishment the Hong Kong Fashion and Design Centre.

=== Fang Brothers Holdings Limited ===
Fang was also the chairman of Fang Brothers Holdings Limited, which he founded to consolidate his expansive interests and wealth. Through Fang Brothers Holdings, he diversified beyond the textile industry, investing into retail & trading, real estate, electronics, and energy storage amongst other sectors.

Fang started the retailing & trading arm in 1973, his portfolio of owned brands included Pringle of Scotland, Episode, Jessica, Color Eighteen, Jean-Pierre, and Excursion amongst others, operating over 1,000 stores worldwide. He also owned significant stakes in other fashion houses. The success of Fang's homegrown brands led him to be considered "Hong Kong's fashion pioneer of the middle market", and at one point "gave the impression that [he] owns every other shop in Hong Kong, all the busiest ones", according to the New York Times. Luxury knitwear fashion-house Pringle of Scotland, acquired in 2000, holds a royal warrant and is one of the world's oldest continually operating fashion companies. He has reportedly personally invested over £100 million into the brand. GRI, a subsidiary operating Fang's licensing and franchising business, distributes a wide range of brands, including being the exclusive licensee of Nine West, Anne Klein New York, and Easy Spirit in Asia and Europe.

Fang's electronics arm included several companies primarily focused on the mainland China region. He acquired Yeebo International Holdings (SEHK: 259) in 1997, a manufacturer of liquid crystal displays, OLED, and eyewear. He was deemed a "white knight" by the media for turning around the company's debt and legal issues. Yeebo Display, a subsidiary, is the world's largest manufacturer of flat-panel LCD displays. In 2005, he acquired a controlling stake in Nantong Jianghai Capacitor Co (SHE: 002484), China's largest manufacturer of capacitors, from a state-owned enterprise. Its core business focuses on producing aluminium electrolytic capacitors. Since taking the company public in 2010, the stock has risen over 300% to-date. In collaboration with CITIC Capital, through China Auto System Technologies, he also held a major stake in Aotecar (SHE: 002239), China's largest manufacturer of air conditioning compressors and HVAC systems.

Fang was praised for re-investing heavily into his hometown, Nantong, and other regions in Jiangsu. He reportedly established over ten businesses in the retail, beer, printing, real estate, and healthcare industries. Amongst those businesses included hypermarket chain Times Ltd, which he sold to Lotte Shopping in 2009 for US$630 million, remaining as the largest acquisition of a Chinese company by a Korean firm to date. He personally pocketed over US$450 million from the sale. Another was Jiangsu Dafuhao Breweries, one of China's 10 most popular beer brands and the most popular in the Jiangsu province. It was later sold to Heineken for an undisclosed amount.

== Positions ==
=== Business ===
- Chairman of Fang Brothers Holdings Limited and related companies (肇豐集團)
- Chairman of Fang Brothers Knitting Limited (肇豐針織)
- Chairman of S.C. Fang & Sons Limited
- Chairman of Yeebo (International Holdings) Limited
- Non-executive Director of the Hongkong and Shanghai Banking Corporation
- Independent non-executive director of Wing Tai Properties Limited
- Independent non-executive director of Jiangsu Expressway Company Limited
- Independent non-executive director of Nan Hai Corporation Limited

=== Community ===
- Chairman of the Hong Kong Productivity Council
- Chairman of the Hong Kong Research Institute of Textiles and Apparel
- Chairman of Hong Kong Examinations Authority
- Chairman of the Board of Governors of the Prince Philip Dental Hospital
- Honorary Chairman of the Hong Kong General Chamber of Textiles
- Honorary Chairman of the Hong Kong Textile Council
- Honorary Life President of the Hong Kong Polytechnic University
- Honorary President of the HKBU Foundation
- Honorary Member of the Court of the Hong Kong University of Science and Technology
- Honorary Member of the Board of Trustees of Nanjing University
- Member of the Court of the University of Hong Kong
- Member of the Court of the Hong Kong Polytechnic University
- Member of the Court of the City University of Hong Kong
- Member of the Textile Advisory Board of the Hong Kong Government

=== Political ===
Fang, as a pro-Beijing entrepreneur, maintained good relations with the Chinese government, and was appointed a member of the National Committee of the Chinese People’s Political Consultative Conference, and a member of the Standing Committee of Chinese People’s Political Consultative Conference of Jiangsu Province.

Some of his other past appointments include:

- Member of the Selection and Preparatory Committee for the first Government of the Hong Kong Special Administrative Region
- Member of the Election Committee (Hong Kong)
- Member of the Hong Kong Affair Advisers to Beijing
- Member of the One Country Two Systems Research Institute
- Member of the Hong Kong Coalition

== Awards and recognition ==
Fang received several honours and awards:

- Justice of the Peace (Hong Kong, 1986)
- Most Excellent Order of the British Empire (United Kingdom, 1990)
- Commander of the Most Excellent Order of the British Empire (United Kingdom, 1997)
- Gold Bauhinia Star (Hong Kong, 2004)
- Honorary Citizen of Nantong, PRC
- Honorary University Fellow by the University of Hong Kong (Hong Kong, 2002)
- Honorary Degree of Doctor of Business Administration by the Hong Kong Polytechnic University (Hong Kong, 2005)
- Honorary Doctorate by the Nanjing University (PRC, 2014)
- Industrialist of the Year by the Federation of Hong Kong Industries (2002)
- Outstanding Leader in Business by the Sing Tao News Corporation (2011)
- First awardee of "Jiangsu Overseas Chinese Entrepreneurs Charity Star" (2013)

== Personal life ==
Fang was married to Diana Bin since April 1967, with three daughters and one son, Katherine, Susanna, Jean, and Douglas. He lived on Osmanthus Road, Kowloon Tong.

In 2009, Forbes estimated his fortune at US$1.6 billion (10 billion Yuan).

Fang was frequently involved in philanthropic activities. Since 1990 he has donated more than $100 million to his hometown, Nantong. These include the construction of several primary and secondary schools in the city, establishment of a program that sent gifted students to Hong Kong each year on a multi-day exchange, donation of $10 million to Nantong University, donation of $3 million to found a cultural arts museum, and gift of $35 million worth of textile weaving equipment. He also made significant contributions to higher education institutions. He donated over $40 million to Nanjing University, where the gymnasium & multi-sports complex is named in honour of his late father. In 2004, he donated $5 million to Shanghai Jiao Tong University, establishing the Kenneth Fang Reward Fund. He made several donations to his alma mater, Massachusetts Institute of Technology, including a $1 million endowment to found the Chinese Language Program in 1992. His son, Douglas, is a member of the MIT Corporation. In 2004, the Fang Brothers Whole Person Development endowment fund at the City University of Hong Kong was established with a large donation, which continues to provides annual scholarships. He established the Fang Professorship in Engineering at the Hong Kong University of Science and Technology, which has been in place since 2016.
