= Transport and Communication (constituency) =

Transport and Communication 運輸及通訊界
- Former Functional constituency for the Legislative Council of Hong Kong
- Electorate: 109,716

Former constituency
- Created: 1995
- Abolished: 1997
- Number of members: One
- Member: Miriam Lau (Liberal)
- Replaced by: Transport

The Transport and Communication functional constituency was in the elections for the Legislative Council of Hong Kong first created in 1995 as one of the nine new functional constituencies under the electoral reform carried out by the then Governor Chris Patten, in which the electorate consisted of total 109,716 eligible voters worked related to the transport and communication industry.

== History ==
Transport and Communication was created as part of the Governor of Hong Kong, Chris Patten's electoral reforms scheduled for the 1995 Hong Kong legislative election, the last Legislative Council election to be held in under British rule before the handover of Hong Kong to China. In the election, it was won by the Liberal Party's Miriam Lau.

Due to the People's Republic of China viewing that Patten's electoral reforms and 1995 election were incompatible with the Sino-British Joint Declaration or Hong Kong Basic Law, that they claimed would leave the legislature as it was when it was signed in 1985. They refused to recognised the elections or reforms as valid and refused to allow the elected Hong Kong Legislative Council elected to continue to sit in the "through-train" arrangement following the Handover. The constituency was abolished with the colonial Legislative Council dissolved after the transfer of the sovereignty in 1997 but Lau continued to sit in the Provisional Legislative Council after being elected to their version of the Transport and Communication constituency in 1996 by the Chinese Selection Committee.

A similar Transport functional constituency was created for the 1998 election by the Hong Kong Special Administrative Region government with a much narrow electorate base in which only 149 electors were eligible, down from 304,000, and eligibility was limited only to transportation associations. Both Lau and Yuen Mo initially proposed expanding the electorate for the new constituency to be similar to Transport and Communication, but both withdrew their proposed amendments.

== Councillors represented ==
Election	Member	Party
1995	Miriam Lau	Liberal
1997	Legislative Council dissolved	

== Election results ==
1995 Legislative Council election: Transport and Communication
Party	Candidate	Votes	%	±%
Liberal	Miriam Lau Kin-yee	14,233	32.89	
FTU	Cheuk Siu-yee	12,617	29.16	
CTU	Ip Kwok-fen	12,055	27.86	
Independent	Cheng Kai-ming	2,324	5.37	
Independent	Cheung Pak-chi	2,042	4.72	
Majority		1,616	3.73	
Total valid votes		43,271	100.00	
Rejected ballots		2,113		
Turnout		45,384	41.36	
Registered electors		109,716		
Liberal win (new seat)				
