= Frankie Yick =

Hong Kong engineer and businessman

The Honourable Frankie Yick Chi-ming SBS
- 易志明
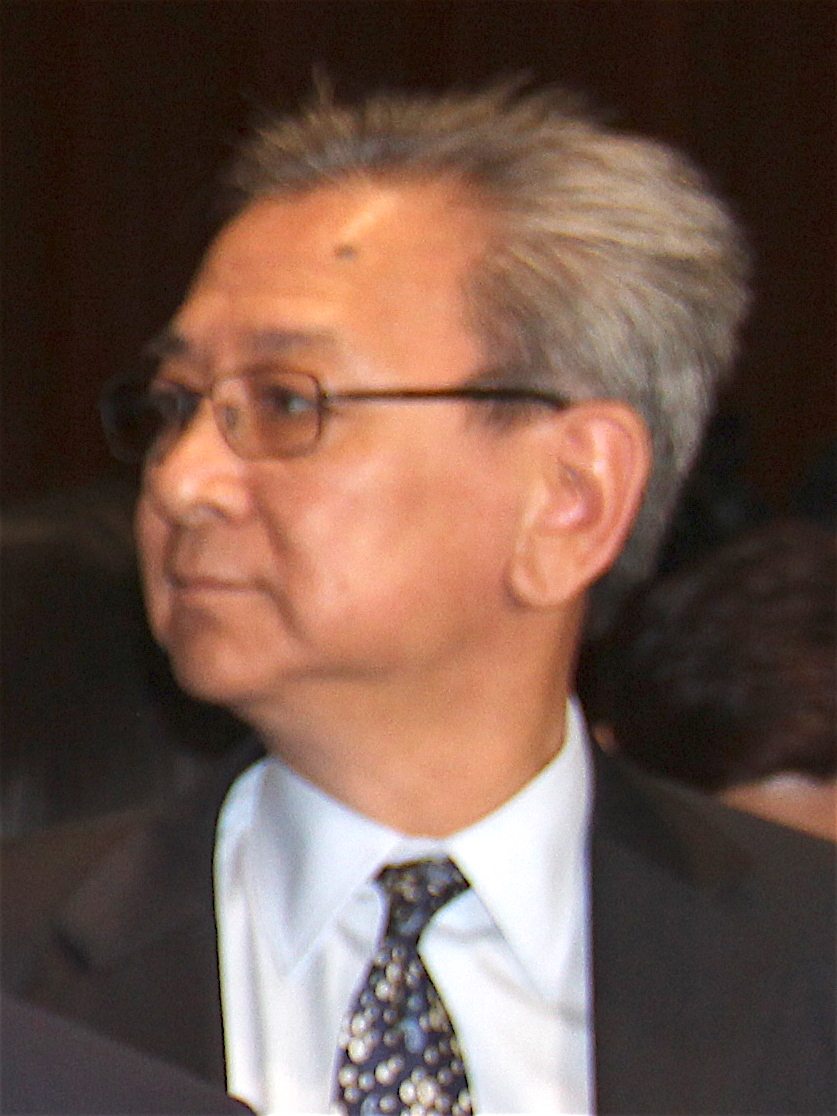

Member of the Legislative Council
- Incumbent
- Assumed office 1 October 2012
- Preceded by: Miriam Lau
- Constituency: Transport FC

Personal details
- Born: 1953 (age 72–73) Hong Kong
- Party: Liberal Party
- Education: University of Hong Kong; University of Birmingham
- Occupation: Company director
- Profession: Engineer

Frankie Yick Chi-ming, SBS (Chinese: 易志明, born 1953) is an engineer, businessman and member of the Legislative Council of Hong Kong for the Transport functional constituency. He was awarded the Silver Bauhinia Star by the Hong Kong SAR Government in 2017.

== Background ==
Yick received a Bachelor of Engineering from the University of Hong Kong and Master of Science in Management from the University of Birmingham. He became fellow of the Chartered Institute of Logistics and Transport, chartered engineer of the Engineering Council and corporate member of the Institution of Engineering and Technology and the Chartered Institute of Purchasing and Supply, all United Kingdom institutions.

Yick has worked extensively in the public transportation and logistics industry. He joined Wharf in 1994 and has been its company director. He has been managing director and director of two of its subsidiaries, Star Ferry Company and Hong Kong Tramways, respectively. He also serves as a director of Hong Kong Air Cargo Terminals Limited, an associate. Yick also held a non-executive director position in Harbour Centre Development in July 2012.

In 1998, he served in the Election Committee for the Transport constituency. Later that year, he was elected to the Legislative Council of Hong Kong as an uncontested candidate, representing the Liberal Party, succeeding incumbent Miriam Lau. He has been a director of the Airport Authority Hong Kong since 1 June 2014.

Legislative Council of Hong Kong
| Preceded by Miriam Lau | Member of Legislative Council; Representative for Transport; 2012–present | Incumbent |
Order of precedence
| Preceded by Steven Ho; Member of the Legislative Council | Hong Kong order of precedence Member of the Legislative Council | Succeeded by Wu Chi-wai; Member of the Legislative Council |
