= Selina Chow =

Hong Kong television executive and politician

Selina Chow Liang Shuk-yee GBS OBE JP
- 周梁淑怡
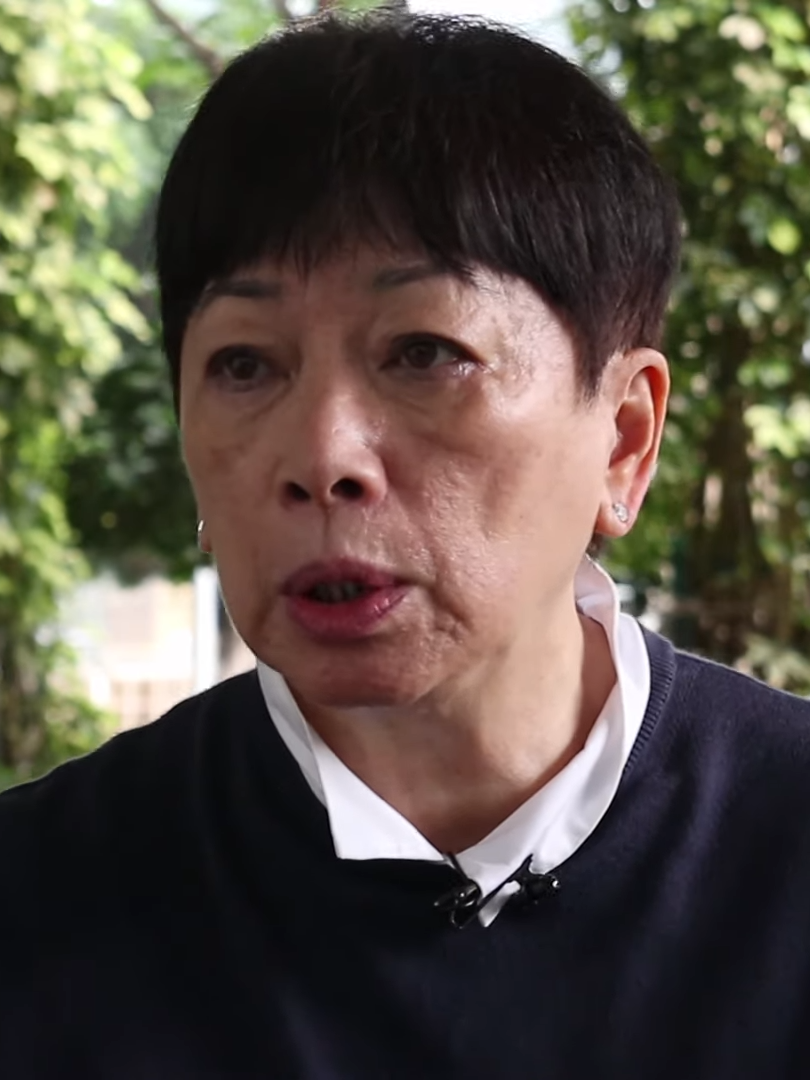
- Selina Chow in 2020

Chairwoman of the Liberal Party
- In office 15 December 2012 – 1 December 2014
- Leader: James Tien
- Preceded by: Vincent Fang (acting)
- Succeeded by: Felix Chung

Non-official Member of the Executive Council
- In office 1991–1992
- Appointed by: Sir David Wilson
- In office 22 September 2003 – 19 September 2008
- Appointed by: Tung Chee-hwa; Donald Tsang
- Preceded by: James Tien

Member of the Legislative Council
- In office 1 September 1981 – 31 July 1995
- Appointed by: Sir Murray MacLehose; Sir Edward Youde; Sir David Wilson
- In office 11 October 1995 – 30 September 2004
- Preceded by: New constituency
- Succeeded by: Vincent Fang
- Constituency: Wholesale and Retail
- In office 1 October 2004 – 30 September 2008
- Preceded by: New seat
- Succeeded by: Wong Kwok-hing
- Constituency: New Territories West

Chairwoman of the Hong Kong Tourism Board
- In office 1 April 2000 – 1 April 2007
- Preceded by: Lo Yuk-sui
- Succeeded by: James Tien

Personal details
- Born: Liang Shuk-yee; 25 January 1945 (age 81) Hong Kong, Empire of Japan
- Party: Liberal Party (1993–2022)
- Spouse: Joseph Chow Ming-kuen (m. 1969; died 2018)
- Children: 2
- Education: St. Paul's Co-Educational College; University of Hong Kong; Rose Bruford College of Speech and Drama

Selina Chow Liang Shuk-yee GBS OBE JP (Chinese: 周梁淑怡; born 25 January 1945) is a former Hong Kong television executive and politician. She was a member of the Legislative Council for nearly three decades, and was also a member of the Executive Council. She is honorary chairwoman of the Liberal Party, having formerly been its chairwoman.

Joining Television Broadcasts Limited (TVB) after graduating from the University of Hong Kong (HKU), she was Hong Kong's first weather girl. She went on to executive roles at all three of Hong Kong's major television broadcasting companies: TVB from 1967 to 1977, general manager of Commercial Television (CTV) from 1977 to 1978 and chief executive of Asia Television (ATV) from 1988 to 1991.

She was first appointed to the Legislative Council in 1981 and the Executive Council in 1991. She was the founding member of the pro-business Liberal Party and the vice-chairwoman from 1998 to 2008. She was appointed to the Executive Council for the second time in 2003. In 2004, she won a directly elected seat in New Territories West but lost in her re-election in 2008. She continued to serve as party chairwoman from 2011 to 2012 and chairwoman from 2012 to 2014.

== Education and television career ==
Selina was born Liang Shuk-yee on 25 January 1945 in Hong Kong. She was educated at St. Paul's Co-educational College and earned a bachelor's degree in English from the University of Hong Kong in 1965. She later obtained a postgraduate diploma from the Rose Bruford College of Speech and Drama and Licentiateship in Drama (Teacher and Performer) of the Royal Academy of Music in the United Kingdom.

Liang started her career in Hong Kong's television broadcasting industry as the first weather girl in Hong Kong at the first wireless TV station Television Broadcasts Limited (TVB) in 1967. She was an assistant producer at TVB in Broadcast Drive for the English and Chinese channels under general manager Colin Bednall before being promoted to Assistant General Manager to run the entire programming section.

Thinking her career in TVB had reached the glass ceiling, Chow left TVB in 1977 and joined Commercial Television (CTV) as general manager in an attempt to resurrect the ailing station, along with around 200 former TVB personnel including Tsui Hark, Patrick Tam and Ringo Lam in a bidding war between CTV and TVB. However, despite spending HK$50 million on production in just three years, CTV was unable to survive in the highly competitive television broadcasting industry and ceased transmissions in 1978. After she left CTV, Chow codirected her only feature film, No Big Deal in 1979, a teen comedy, with Po-Chih Leong.

In August 1988, Lai Sun Group founder Lim Por-yen took over Asia Television (ATV) and hired Chow as the station's chief executive. Chow proceeded in the same month to unveil a $233 million six-year investment plan to improve ATV's competitive edge against TVB. Chow's first year in office saw ATV's annual budget rocket to an estimated $300–350 million, just $100–150 million less than TVB. It also poached many talents from TVB, including comedy stars Lydia Shum and Eric Tsang, as well as producers, technical staff and administrators. The growing deficit sapped Chow's power as chief executive and in March 1991 she was formally dismissed and replaced by Lam Por-yen himself.

== Legislative Council ==
=== Colonial period ===
Chow first stepped into politics when she was appointed to the Urban Council in 1980. She was subsequently appointed to the Legislative Council in 1981 by Governor Murray MacLehose. She also held numerous public offices at the time, including the membership of the Law Reform Commission, the Housing Authority and the Education Commission, a well as the chairmanship of the Consumer Council.

In 1991, she was appointed to the Executive Council, the top advisory board in the government, by Governor David Wilson. She resigned the following year after the arrival of the last Governor Chris Patten who wanted to reshuffle the council. Chow was also a member of the Co-operative Resources Centre (CRC) headed by Senior Member of the Legislative Council Allen Lee consisting of the appointed members who aimed to counter the rise of the United Democrats of Hong Kong (UDHK) in the legislature after their landslide victory in the first ever direct election in 1991.

The CRC soon transformed into the Liberal Party to actively lobby against Chris Patten's constitutional reform proposal, which they thought would damaged the smooth transfer of sovereignty of Hong Kong due to Beijing's strong opposition. In the 1995 Legislative Council election, Chow contested in the Wholesale and Retail functional constituency and won the seat against Wong Kwok-hing of the Beijing-loyalist Democratic Alliance for the Betterment of Hong Kong (DAB). She was later elected to the Beijing-controlled Provisional Legislative Council (PLC) after the dismantling of the "through train" of the last colonial Legislative Council.

=== SAR period ===
In the first SAR Legislative Council election in 1998, Allen Lee resigned as Liberal Party chairman lost in the direct election. James Tien succeeded as chairman and Chow became party vice-chairwoman. After 1997, the Liberal Party became the partner in Tung Chee-hwa's "governing coalition" which saw Chow being appointed to the Hong Kong Tourist Association before it was transformed into the Hong Kong Tourism Board in 2001.

She has also been a board member of the Hong Kong Airport Authority, honorary adviser to Against Child Abuse, and director of the Hong Kong Intellectual Property Society. As the most senior member in the Legislative Council, she was also the chairwoman of the House Committee of the Legislative Council from 2000 to 2003. From 2003 to 2008, she was also a member of the 10th National Committee of Chinese People's Political Consultative Conference (CPPCC).

Public opposition to the national security legislation of the Basic Law Article 23, and the historic 2003 July 1st protest against it, led to the resignation of Liberal Party chairman James Tien from the Executive Council on 6 July. Without Liberal support in the legislature, the government was short of sufficient votes to pass the bill, which it later shelved. In September 2003, Chow was appointed to the Executive Council to fill Tien's vacancy.

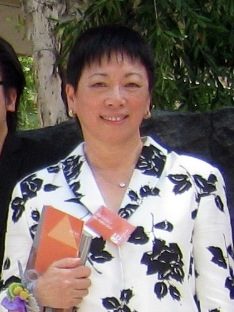
Chow, the then-chairwoman of Liberal Party, in 2008

Riding on the popularity from the 2003 crisis, Chow and Tien left their trade-based functional constituencies and ran in geographical constituencies. Chow won a seat in New Territories West with more than 50,000 votes, more than 10 per cent of the vote share, and was elected with Tien.

In the 2008 Legislative Council election, she lost her re-election in the New Territories West by receiving only about 21,000 votes, ending her 27 years of service in the legislature. Chow blamed the loss of her seat on Heung Yee Kuk chairman and Liberal Party member Lau Wong-fat for canvassing for the DAB candidate Cheung Hok-ming during the elections. As a result, both Tien and Chow resigned from the party organ with Chow also resigned from the Executive Council.

== After Legislative Council ==
Selina Chow and James Tien returned to the party leadership after the intra-party split between James's brother Michael Tien and Tommy Cheung over the Minimum Wage Bill which resulted Michael's departure from the party. In January 2011, Chow succeeded Tommy Cheung as the vice-chairwoman for the second time. In the 2012 Chief Executive election, the Liberals initially supported their former member and Chief Secretary for Administration Henry Tang but withdrew their support after Henry Tang's illegal basement controversy. However, they refused to support another Beijing-supported candidate Leung Chun-ying. Selina Chow and party chairwoman Miriam Lau defended their null vote as "the responsible decision" as they could not with all conscience vote for either Tang or Leung; their internal poll of 1,900 people showed 30 percent would cast blank votes.

After Miriam Lau was defeated in Hong Kong Island in the 2012 Legislative Council election and resigned as party chairwoman, Selina Chow was elected chairwoman, unopposed, on 15 December 2012. Under her chairmanship, the new office of party leader was created and assumed by James Tien. She held the chairmanship for two years until she was succeeded by Felix Chung and became the party honorary chairwoman.

In the 2017 Chief Executive election, she split with other party figures in the election to nominate former Financial Secretary John Tsang on the capacity as an Election Committee member for Wholesale and Retail with James Tien, Miriam Lau and Felix Chung against the former Chief Secretary for Administration, the Beijing-supported Carrie Lam.

== Personal life ==
Liang is married to engineer Joseph Chow Ming-kuen, having proposed on the phone when he was in Britain in 1968. The couple have two daughters, Chee-may and Chee-kay, she also has five grandchildren ages 13, 11, 11, 8 and 2

== See also ==
- List of graduates of University of Hong Kong

Political offices
Preceded by Gallant Ho	Chairman of Hong Kong Consumer Council; 1984–1988	Succeeded by Martin Lee
Preceded by Lo Yuk-sui	Chairman of the Hong Kong Tourist Association; 2000–2001	Succeeded by Herself as Chairman of the Hong Kong Tourism Board
Preceded by Herself as Chairman of the Hong Kong Tourist Association	Chairman of the Hong Kong Tourism Board; 2001–2007	Succeeded by James Tien
Business positions
Preceded by Vacant	Chief Executive of Asia Television; 1988–1991	Succeeded by Lim Por-yen
Legislative Council of Hong Kong
New constituency	Member of Legislative Council; Representative for Wholesale and Retail; 1995–1997	Replaced by Provisional Legislative Council
New parliament	Member of Provisional Legislative Council; 1997–1998	Replaced by Legislative Council
New parliament	Member of Legislative Council; Representative for Wholesale and Retail; 1998–2004	Succeeded by Vincent Fang
Preceded by Leong Che-hung	Chairman of House Committee; 2000–2003	Succeeded by Miriam Lau
New seat	Member of Legislative Council; Representative for New Territories West; 2004–2008	Succeeded by Wong Kwok-hing
Party political offices
Preceded by Steven Poon	Vice-Chairperson of the Liberal Party; 1998–2008; With: Ronald Arculli (1998–2000); Miriam Lau (2000–2008)	Succeeded by Tommy Cheung
Preceded by Tommy Cheung	Vice-Chairperson of the Liberal Party; 2011–2012; Served alongside: Vincent Fang	Succeeded by Felix Chung
Preceded by Vincent Fang as Acting Chairman	Chairperson of the Liberal Party; 2012–2014	Succeeded by Felix Chung
Order of precedence
Preceded by Lee Shing-see; Recipients of the Gold Bauhinia Star	Hong Kong order of precedence Recipients of the Gold Bauhinia Star	Succeeded by Chang Hsin-kang; Recipients of the Gold Bauhinia Star
