= Vincent Fang (entrepreneur) =

Hong Kong entrepreneur and politician

Vincent Fang Kang GBS, JP
- 方剛
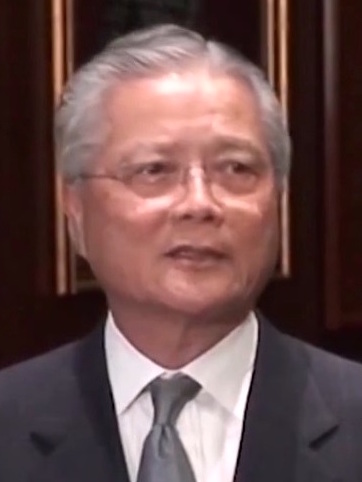

Leader of the Liberal Party
- In office 1 December 2014 – 7 October 2016
- Preceded by: James Tien
- Succeeded by: Felix Chung

Member of the Legislative Council
- In office 1 October 2004 – 30 September 2016
- Preceded by: Selina Chow
- Succeeded by: Shiu Ka-fai
- Constituency: Wholesale and Retail

Personal details
- Born: 7 May 1943 (age 83) Shanghai, Republic of China
- Party: Liberal Party
- Spouse: Patricia Tsang Lai-sheung
- Relations: Kenneth Fang (Brother) Douglas Fang (Nephew)
- Education: Wah Yan College; North Carolina State University (BSc, MSc)
- Occupation: Legislative Councillor

Vincent Fang
- Traditional Chinese: 方剛
- Simplified Chinese: 方刚
Transcriptions
Standard Mandarin
- Hanyu Pinyin: Fāng Gāng
Yue: Cantonese
- Jyutping: Fong1 Gong1

Vincent Fang Kang, GBS, JP (born 7 May 1943) is a Chinese businessman in the garment industry. He is the former chairman and leader of the Liberal Party of Hong Kong and a former member of the Legislative Council of Hong Kong, representing the Wholesale and Retail functional constituency.

== Early life, family, education and business career ==
Fang was born into the Fang family in Shanghai, China on 7 May 1943 during the Second Sino-Japanese War. His older brother is the billionaire industrialist Kenneth Fang, who is known as the "King of Textiles" and founded Fang Brothers Knitting, one of the world's largest apparel-manufacturing business that is separate from the family's textile operations. One of Fang's nephews is Douglas Fang, the son of Kenneth Fang and the chairman of Fang Brothers Holdings, which manages business interests of the descendants of his late father, and is engaged in electronics, retail, property development, energy storage, and auto parts sectors. Fang's son, Alan Fang, is chief executive of Novo Holdings, China's largest multi-brand fashion retailer. He is also known for bringing Formula Electric Racing to Hong Kong in 2016, and is the principal backer of privately-funded Kaleido Park, a 11-hectare European-style floral cultural garden in Lantau Island.

He moved to Hong Kong and attended Wah Yan College, a Jesuit all-boys secondary school, graduating in 1962. He earned bachelor's and master's degrees in Science of Textiles Engineering from the North Carolina State University in 1967 and 1969. After he returned to Hong Kong, he became the chief executive of the Toppy Group, managing over 350 stores and 500 outlets worldwide. Under his leadership, Toppy Group has grown into "the Hong Kong fashion industry's greatest success", and amongst its accolades include the International Award at the Hong Kong Business Awards. He was also managing director of Fantastic Garments Limited.

Fang has been an Independent Non Executive Director of The Wharf (Holdings) Limited since July 1993. He also served as honorary advisor of Hong Kong Retail Management Association, chairman of the Association of Better Business & Tourism Services and the Director of The Federation of Hong Kong Garment Manufacturers.

== Legislative Councillor ==
Fang is a core member of the pro-business Liberal Party. In the 2004 Legislative Council election, he succeeded Selina Chow Liang Shuk-yee to as member of the Legislative Council of Hong Kong through Wholesale and Retail functional constituency when Chow contested in the geographical constituency direct election in New Territories West.

In 2008 after Chairman James Tien Pei-chun and Vice-chairwoman Selina Chow both resigned from the posts after their defeat in the Legislative Council election, he became the vice-chairman with Tommy Cheung Yu-yan. He acted as Chairman when Miriam Lau Kin-yee resigned as chairwoman after she failed to bid for a seat in Hong Kong Island in the 2012 Legislative Council election. He became the Leader of the Liberal Party in 2014, when James Tien was stripped from the Chinese People's Political Consultative Conference after calling for Chief Executive CY Leung to resign during the 2014 Hong Kong protests.

In April 2010, Fang's suggestion that the minimum wage should be set at HK$20 per hour drew fire both from the public and from his own party. His statement made a case for those in the community who criticise functional constituency lawmakers as disconnected from the worries and realities of the public at large. He also had the lowest attendance and voting record among lawmakers in the 2008–2012 Legislative Council.

Fang has been appointed member of the Hong Kong Hospital Authority (2000–2006), Hong Kong Tourism Board (2003–2009) and Hong Kong Housing Authority (2009–2015). He is also a member of the Operations Review Committee of the Independent Commission Against Corruption (ICAC) and a board member of the Hong Kong Airport Authority (2005–2011). He was awarded the Silver Bauhinia Star (SBS) by the Hong Kong SAR Government in 2008, and later on a Gold Bauhinia Star (GBS).

Legislative Council of Hong Kong
Preceded by Selina Chow	Member of Legislative Council; Representative for Wholesale and Retail; 2004–present	Succeeded by Shiu Ka-fai
Party political offices
Preceded by Miriam Lau	Vice-Chairperson of the Liberal Party; 2008–2014	Succeeded by Peter Shiu
Preceded by Miriam Lau	Chairperson of the Liberal Party; Acting; 2012	Succeeded by Selina Chow
Preceded by James Tien	Leader of the Liberal Party; 2014–present	Incumbent
Order of precedence
Preceded by Chan Kam-lam; Recipients of the Gold Bauhinia Star	Hong Kong order of precedence Recipients of the Gold Bauhinia Star	Succeeded by Anissa Wong; Recipients of the Gold Bauhinia Star
