= Felix Chung =

Hong Kong politician

The Honourable Felix Chung
- 鍾國斌
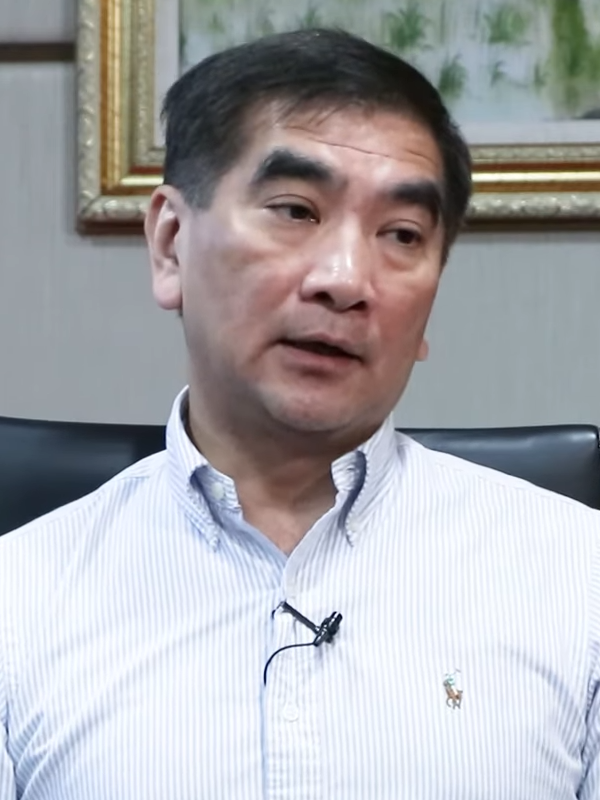
- Felix Chung in 2020

Member of the Legislative Council
- In office 1 October 2012 – 31 December 2021
- Preceded by: Sophie Leung
- Succeeded by: Sunny Tan
- Constituency: Textiles and Garment

Leader of the Liberal Party
- In office 7 October 2016 – 10 May 2022
- Preceded by: Vincent Fang
- Succeeded by: Tommy Cheung

Chairman of the Liberal Party
- In office 1 December 2014 – 7 October 2016
- Leader: Vincent Fang
- Preceded by: Selina Chow
- Succeeded by: Tommy Cheung

Personal details
- Born: 4 November 1963 (age 62) Hong Kong
- Party: Liberal Party (since 2009)
- Education: Robert Gordon University (BSc); Stirling University (MBA)
- Occupation: Legislative Councillor; Merchant

Chinese name
- Traditional Chinese: 鍾國斌
Transcriptions
Yue: Cantonese
- Yale Romanization: Jūng Gwok bān
- Jyutping: Zung^{1} Gwok^{3} ban^{1}

Felix Chung Kwok-pan (Chinese: 鍾國斌, born 4 November 1963) is a former member of the Legislative Council of Hong Kong for the Textiles and Garment constituency, representing the Liberal Party. He was the leader of the Liberal Party from 2016 to 2022 and the party chairman from 2014 to 2016.

== Early career ==
He was born in 1963 to a garment business family who owns the Chungweiming Knitting Factory Limited. He was educated in Scotland, graduating from Robert Gordon University in Aberdeen with a bachelor's degree of science in 1986 and Stirling University with a degree of Master of Business Administration in 1988. He returned to Hong Kong in 1987 when he was 24 and joined a local surveying firm and later helped his father with his garment business of manufacturing wool knitwear and cotton knitted wear in 1988.

He later became the chairman of the Hong Kong Apparel Society and challenged as an independent for the Textiles and Garment functional constituency against a long-time incumbent Sophie Leung of the Liberal Party in the 2008 Legislative Council election. Chung received 711 votes, as compared to Leung's 1,255 votes, who soon fell out with the Liberals and left with two other legislators to form the Economic Synergy.

== Legislative Councillor ==
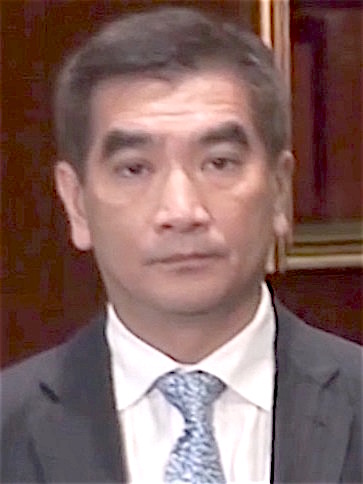
Chung in 2015

He was invited by the Liberal Party honorary chairman James Tien to join the party in 2009. In the 2012 Legislative Council election, he challenged again in the same constituency against Henry Tan, CEO and president of Luen Thai Holdings, after Leung announced her retirement. He defeated Tan by 1,076 votes and took back the constituency for the Liberals. He became the vice-chairman after the election. When both James Tien and Selina Chow stepped down as party leader and chair, Chung was nominated to be the party vice-chairman on 1 December 2014.

He engaged in a debate with Chief Executive Leung Chun-ying over Leung's "appropriately proactive" economic policies on newspaper in 2015. He thought that Leung abandoning the "positive non-interventionism" for "appropriately proactive" policies was worrisome, in which the "visible hand" would "go beyond the line".

He retained his seat in the 2016 Legislative Council election by winning more than 75 percent of the votes. After the election, he succeeded the retiring Vincent Fang to become the leader of the Liberal Party.

He is also a member of the Advisory Committee on Textile & Clothing Industries, a director of the Chinese Manufacturers' Association of Hong Kong and a director of Hong Kong Brand Development Council. He was also a member of the 9th Guangdong Provincial Committee of the Chinese People's Political Consultative Conference in 1998. He has also been member of the Election Committee since 2006.

In the 2021 LegCo election, Chung became one of the two defeated incumbents after winning only 82 votes, half of votes received by his challenger Sunny Tan, thus ending his nine years of tenure. He stayed as the party leader until the next May, when he was succeeded by Tommy Cheung.

Legislative Council of Hong Kong
Preceded by Sophie Leung	Member of Legislative Council; Representative for Textiles and Garment; 2012–2021	Succeeded by Sunny Tan
Party political offices
Preceded by Selina Chow	Vice-Chairperson of the Liberal Party; 2012–2014; Served alongside: Vincent Fang	Succeeded by Peter Shiu
Preceded by Selina Chow	Chairman of the Liberal Party; 2014–2016	Succeeded by Tommy Cheung
Preceded by Vincent Fang	Leader of the Liberal Party; 2016–present	Incumbent
Order of precedence
Preceded by Lo Wai-kwok; Member of the Legislative Council	Hong Kong order of precedence Member of the Legislative Council	Succeeded by Alvin Yeung; Member of the Legislative Council
