= Vincent Fang =

Vincent Fang is the name of:

- Vincent Fang (lyricist), Taiwanese lyricist
- Vincent Fang (entrepreneur), Hong Kong entrepreneur and member of the Legislative Council
