= Peter Shiu =

Hong Kong politician (born 1970)

The Honourable Shiu Ka-fai
- 邵家輝
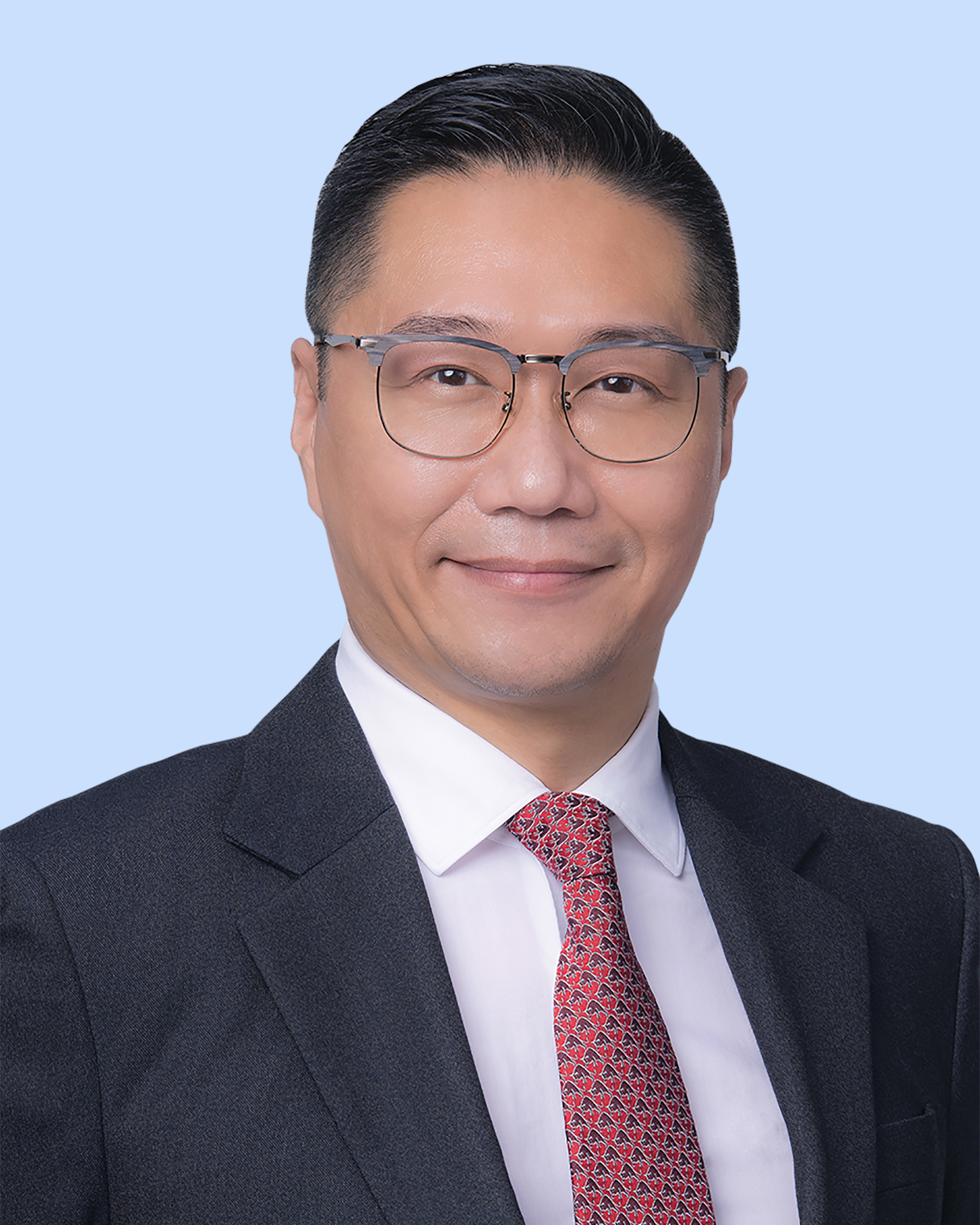

Chairman of Liberal Party
- Incumbent
- Assumed office 10 May 2022
- Leader: Tommy Cheung (until 2026)
- Preceded by: Tommy Cheung

Member of the Legislative Council
- Incumbent
- Assumed office 1 October 2016
- Preceded by: Vincent Fang
- Constituency: Wholesale and Retail

Personal details
- Born: 22 April 1970 (age 56) Hong Kong
- Party: Liberal Party
- Education: University of Auckland

Peter Shiu Ka-fai (Chinese: 邵家輝, born 22 April 1970) is the current Chairman of the Liberal Party and a member of the Legislative Council of Hong Kong. He is also a former member of Eastern District Council, for Braemar Hill constituency on Hong Kong Island.

He graduated from the University of Auckland in New Zealand. He is a Liberal Party member and has been a member of the executive committee since 2009. He is the chairperson of the Liberal Party's Ban Gay Marriage Hong Kong and has suggested that children reading books about homosexuality might confuse them or distort how they think about families. In December 2014, he was elected vice-chairman of the party with Vincent Fang Kang and Felix Chung Kwok-pan as the party Leader and chairman respectively.

In the 2016 Hong Kong legislative election, Shiu won a seat in the Wholesale and Retail functional constituency, keeping the seat in Liberal hands, with 65 percent of the vote.

He was appointed to the Buildings Appeal Tribunal Panel, Independent Police Complaints Commission and Observers and Business Facilitation Advisory Committee. He has been a member of the Eastern District Council since the 2007 District Council elections through the Braemar Hill constituency. In the 2011 Election Committee elections, he was elected to the Election Committee through Hong Kong and Kowloon District Council subsector.

In March 2021, Shiu claimed that RTHK was too biased against the Hong Kong Police Force, and asked if the government intended to "fix" it.

He is a director of the Master Proofer Corporation.

In August 2023, he called on the Hong Kong justice department to continue to try to ban the song Glory to Hong Kong, after a judge ruled against a proposed ban by the government.

In November 2023, he was part of a group of lawmakers who said that the 2023 Gay Games may infringe on the national security law.

In the 2025 Hong Kong legislative election, Shiu won a seat in the Wholesale and Retail functional constituency again with 827 votes, keeping the seat in Liberal hands.

== See also ==
- LGBT rights in Hong Kong

Political offices
Preceded by Chan Bing-woon	Member of Eastern District Council; Representative for Braemar Hill; 2008–2019	Succeeded by Kenny Yuen Kin-chung
Party political offices
Preceded by Vincent Fang; Felix Chung	Vice-chairperson of Liberal Party; 2014–present	Incumbent
Legislative Council of Hong Kong
Preceded by Vincent Fang	Member of Legislative Council; Representative for Wholesale and Retail; 2016–present	Incumbent
Order of precedence
Preceded by Holden Chow; Member of the Legislative Council	Hong Kong order of precedence Member of the Legislative Council	Succeeded by Shiu Ka-chun; Member of the Legislative Council
