= Sunny Tan =

Hong Kong politician

The Honourable Sunny Tan
- 陳祖恒
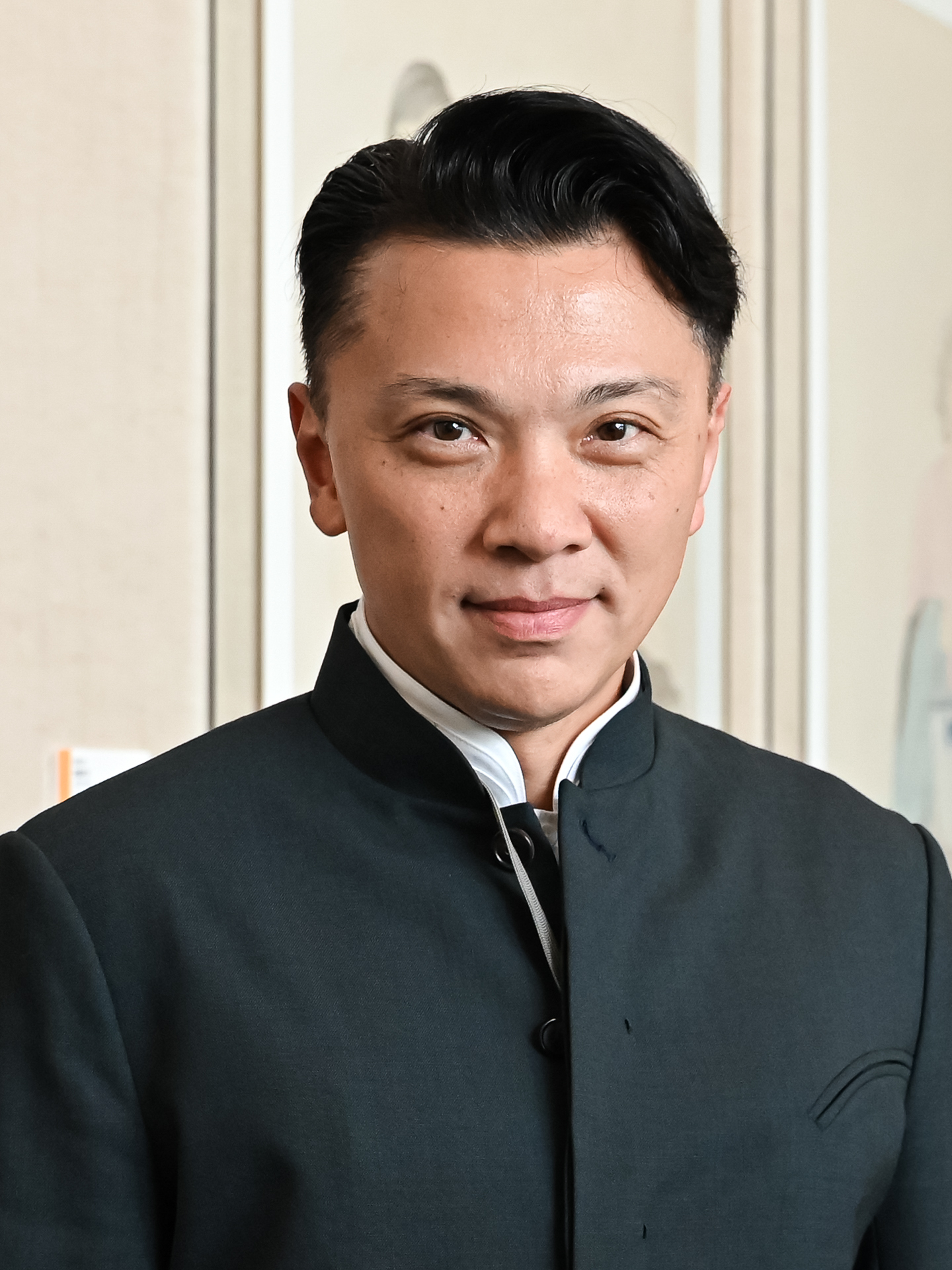
- Tan in 2023

Member of the Legislative Council
- Incumbent
- Assumed office 1 January 2022
- Preceded by: Felix Chung
- Constituency: Textiles and Garment

Personal details
- Born: 1973 (age 52–53)
- Party: BPA
- Education: Stanford University (MSc); University of Wisconsin-Madison (BBA)

Sunny Tan (Chinese: 陳祖恒) is a Hong Kong businessman and politician who has been one of the four executive deputy chairmen of the Federation of Hong Kong Industries. He is a Legislative Councilor since 2022. He joined the pro-Beijing Business and Professionals Alliance for Hong Kong Party (BPA) in 2022.

== Electoral history ==
2021 Legislative Council election: Textiles and Garment
Party	Candidate	Votes	%	±%
Nonpartisan	Tan Sunny	172	67.72	
Liberal	Chung Kwok Pan	82	32.28	−43.64
Majority		90	35.43	
Total valid votes		254		
Turnout				
Nonpartisan gain from Liberal				

Legislative Council of Hong Kong
Preceded by Felix Chung	Member of Legislative Council; Representative for Textiles and Garment; 2022–present	Incumbent
