= Braemar Hill (constituency) =

Hong Kong constituency

- Elected constituency for the Eastern District Council
- Boundary of Braemar Hill in Eastern District
- District: Eastern
- Legislative Council constituency: Hong Kong Island East
- Population: 16,259 (2019)
- Electorate: 7,884 (2019)

Current constituency
- Created: 1994
- Number of members: One
- Member: Kenny Yuen Kin-chung (Liberal)

Braemar Hill (Chinese: 寶馬山), formerly called Causeway Bay South before 1994, is one of the 35 constituencies in the Eastern District.

The constituency returns one district councillor to the Eastern District Council, with an election every four years. The seat is currently held by Kenny Yuen Kin-chung of the Liberal Party.

Braemar Hill constituency is loosely based on Braemar Hill with estimated population of 16,259.

== Councillors represented ==
Election	Member	Party	%
1994	Chan Bing-woon	Independent	74.62
1999	Chan Bing-woon	Independent	N/A
2003	Chan Bing-woon	Independent	55.59
2007	Peter Shiu Ka-fai	Liberal	54.81
2011	Peter Shiu Ka-fai	Liberal	N/A
2015	Peter Shiu Ka-fai	Liberal	N/A
2019	Kenny Yuen Kin-chung	Liberal	55.23

== Election results ==
=== 2010s ===
Eastern District Council Election, 2019: Braemar Hill
Party	Candidate	Votes	%	±%
Liberal	Kenny Yuen Kin-chung	3,111	55.23	
Nonpartisan	Matthew Lai Kwok-him	2,522	44.77	
Majority		589	10.46	
Turnout		5,660	71.79	
Liberal hold		Swing		

Eastern District Council Election, 2015: Braemar Hill
Party	Candidate	Votes	%	±%
Liberal	Shiu Ka-fai	Uncontested		
Liberal hold		Swing		

Eastern District Council Election, 2011: Braemar Hill
Party	Candidate	Votes	%	±%
Liberal	Shiu Ka-fai	Uncontested		
Liberal hold		Swing		

=== 2000s ===
Eastern District Council Election, 2007: Braemar Hill
Party	Candidate	Votes	%	±%
Liberal	Shiu Ka-fai	1,385	54.81	
Civic	James Lo Yuen-ho	1,142	45.19	
Majority		243	0.62	
Liberal gain from Independent		Swing		

Eastern District Council Election, 2003: Braemar Hill
Party	Candidate	Votes	%	±%
Independent	Chan Bing-woon	1,108	55.59	
Independent	Chu Fung-chee	885	44.41	
Independent hold		Swing		

=== 1990s ===
Eastern District Council Election, 1999: Braemar Hill
Party	Candidate	Votes	%	±%
Independent	Chan Bing-woon	Uncontested		
Independent hold		Swing		

Eastern District Board Election, 1994: Braemar Hill
Party	Candidate	Votes	%	±%
Independent	Chan Bing-woon	1,185	74.62	
Liberal	Poon Ka-fung	403	25.38	
Majority		782	49.24	
Independent win (new seat)				
