= Tommy Cheung =

Hong Kong politician (born 1949)

The Honourable Tommy Cheung GBS, JP
- 張宇人
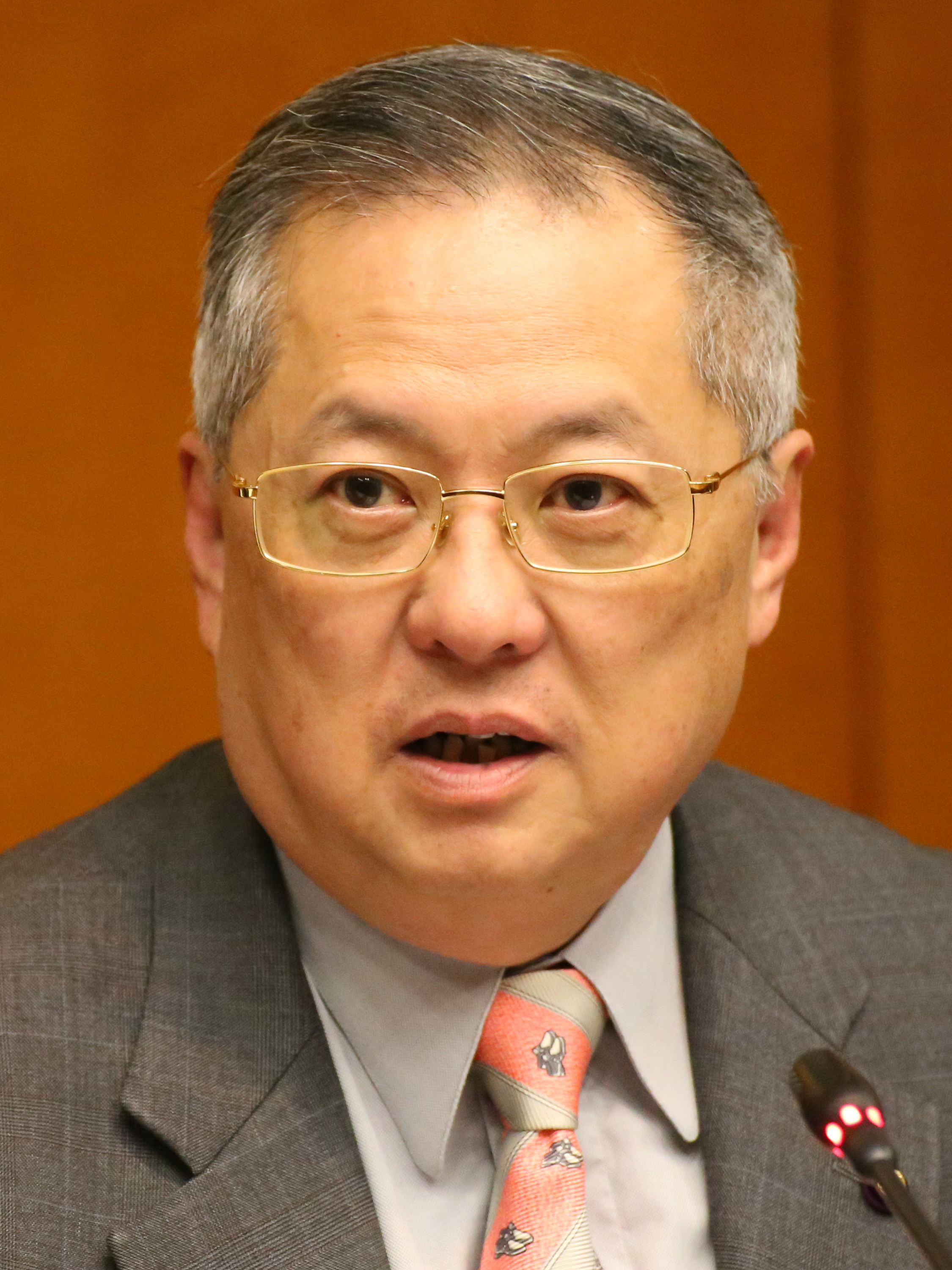
- Cheung in 2017

Non-official Member of the Executive Council
- Incumbent
- Assumed office 25 November 2016
- Appointed by: Leung Chun-ying; Carrie Lam; John Lee

Member of the Legislative Council
- In office 1 October 2000 – 31 December 2025
- Preceded by: New constituency
- Succeeded by: Jonathan Leung
- Constituency: Catering

Leader of the Liberal Party
- In office 10 May 2022 – 15 November 2026
- Preceded by: Felix Chung
- Succeeded by: Post abolished

Chairman of the Liberal Party
- In office 7 October 2016 – 10 May 2022
- Leader: Felix Chung
- Preceded by: Felix Chung
- Succeeded by: Peter Shiu

Personal details
- Born: 30 September 1949 (age 77) British Hong Kong
- Party: Liberal Party
- Education: Diocesan Boys' School; Pepperdine University (BSc, M.B.A.)
- Occupation: Businessman politician

Tommy Cheung
- Traditional Chinese: 張宇人
Transcriptions
Yue: Cantonese
- Yale Romanization: Jēung Yúh yàhn
- Jyutping: Zoeng^{1} Jyu^{5} jan^{4}

Tommy Cheung Yu-yan, GBS, JP (Chinese: 張宇人, born 30 September 1949 in Hong Kong) is a Hong Kong politician and former member of the Legislative Council of Hong Kong (LegCo), representing the Catering functional constituency. He is also a non-official member of the Executive Council of Hong Kong and is leader of the Liberal Party, having previously served as party chairman from 2016 to 2022.

== Career ==
He graduated from the Diocesan Boys' School and Pepperdine University. He was previously a member of the Eastern District Council. He is a businessman, chairman of a trading and investment company, and a member of the Diocesan Boys' School school committee.

== Legislative Councillor ==
In late 2005, when there were strong concerns regarding a potential "bird flu" pandemic, Cheung became "an outspoken opponent of migratory birds". He stated that migrating birds were the source of the pandemic threat.

On 20 March 2010, after Cheung suggested a minimum wage of HK$20/hour, he became the subject of insults and derision from labour quarters, nicknamed "$20 Cheung".

During the 2020 coronavirus pandemic, Cheung spoke out against the government's extension of mandatory social distancing measures. He complained that catering constituents were suffering due to mandatory closures of some types of businesses, such as bars and karaoke centres, and accused the government of "not understanding economics".

In January 2021, Cheung partially blamed teachers for the 2019–20 Hong Kong protests and that CCTV cameras should be installed in classrooms to monitor teachers for "subversive remarks."

In December 2022, Cheung was one of three lawmakers who drafted legislation to reform CUHK's governing council, saying "During the anti-government turmoil in 2019, there was a riot on the campus of CUHK but the attitude and handling of the incident by CUHK were appalling.

In December 2022, Cheung said "We need to take action to correct such behaviour that is this disrespectful to Hong Kong and to our country" and that he would support summing Google to the Legislative Council, to answer questions on why Glory to Hong Kong was ranked so highly when searching for the national anthem of Hong Kong. At the same month, he was tested positive for COVID-19.

In September 2023, Cheung drew criticism after he helped push a bill to revamp Chinese University's governing council without the school's endorsement, with former lawmaker Abraham Shek asking "They should table the bill with the university’s endorsement. Why do they have to be that authoritarian?"

Cheung retired from the Legislative Council in the 2025 election, amidst a massive wave of retirement.

On 15 November 2026, the position of Party Leader in the Liberal Party had been abolished following the Liberal Party leadership reshuffle, making him the final Leader of the Liberal Party.

== Chairman of the Liberal Party ==
Cheung was elected Liberal Party's new chairman after the 2016 Legislative Council election in October. The new leadership was seen as more moderate and conservative with less vocal anti-Leung Chun-ying (pro-government, but anti-Leung) stance. Cheung was subsequently appointed by Leung to the Executive Council. Cheung was reappointed to the Executive Council successively by Carrie Lam and John Lee.

Cheung voted against paternity leave when it was introduced to the Employment Ordinance in 2015. In 2018, he opposed the Hong Kong government proposal to increase statutory paternity leave from three to five days, claiming the benefit itself should not even exist, as demands for more would be "never-ending". Cheung said that "back in the 1980s" there was no legally mandated paternal leave, but many companies would still grant "white days" for funerals and "red days" for auspicious events such as births and marriages without the need for "inflexible" labour laws requiring them to do so. Cheung's remarks attracted a lot of criticism, including by Ng Chau-pei of the pro-Beijing Hong Kong Federation of Trade Unions, who described Cheung as taking part in a "barbaric form of capitalism". Another Executive Councillor, New People's Party chairwoman Regina Ip agreed members should avoid publicly criticising the government.

Legislative Council of Hong Kong
Preceded by Ambrose Cheung as Representative for Urban Council	Member of Legislative Council; Representative for Catering; 2000–2025	Succeeded by Jonathan Leung
Preceded by Abraham Shek	Senior Member in Legislative Council; 2022–2025	Succeeded by Starry Lee
Preceded by Emily Lau	Chairman of Finance Committee; 2012–2013	Succeeded by Ng Leung-sing
Preceded by Ng Leung-sing	Chairman of Finance Committee; 2014–2015	Succeeded by Chan Kin-por
Party political offices
Preceded by Selina Chow	Vice-Chairperson of the Liberal Party; 2008–2010; Served alongside: Vincent Fang	Succeeded by Selina Chow
Preceded by Felix Chung	Chairman of the Liberal Party; 2016–2022	Succeeded by Peter Shiu
Order of precedence
Preceded by Jeffrey Lam; Member of the Executive Council	Hong Kong order of precedence Member of the Executive Council	Succeeded by Martin Liao; Member of the Executive Council
