= Catering (constituency) =

Hong Kong functional constituency

Catering 飲食界
- Functional constituency for the Legislative Council of Hong Kong
- Region: Hong Kong
- Electorate: 129

Current constituency
- Created: 2000
- Number of members: One
- Member: Jonathan Leung (Liberal)
- Created from: Regional Council and Urban Council

The Catering functional constituency (Chinese: 飲食界功能界別) is a functional constituency in the elections for the Legislative Council of Hong Kong created for the 2000 Legislative Council election to replace the Urban Council and Regional Council constituencies. The constituency is composed of bodies of several catering associations. It is also corresponding to the Catering Subsector in the Election Committee. Since its creation, it has been held by Liberal Party's Tommy Cheung.

A similar Hotels and Catering functional constituency was created for the 1995 election by the then governor Chris Patten with a much larger electorate base composed of almost 70,000 voters.

== Composition ==
Before the major electoral overhaul in 2021, the Catering constituency contained both corporate and individual members who held food licenses and/or are members of associations such as the Association for the Hong Kong Catering Services Management Limited, the Hong Kong Catering Industry Association Limited and the Association of Restaurant Managers Limited.

The constituency was criticised for favouring big business. It was revealed that around one in 10 corporate voters have links to four major conglomerates in Hong Kong, more than 100 of the 1,004 corporate voters registered give addresses connected with the Tao Heung Group, Cafe de Coral Group, Fulum Group and Victoria Harbour Restaurant Group.

After the electoral change in 2021, the eligible voters constituency were further limited to the bodies who are holders of food business licences under the Public Health and Municipal Services Ordinance (Cap. 132) that are entitled to vote at the Board of The Association for Hong Kong Catering Services Management Limited, the Association of Restaurant Managers Limited or the Hong Kong Catering Industry Association Limited. As a result, the registered voters declined sharply from 5,485 in 2016 to only 141 in 2021.

== Return members ==
Election	Member	Party
2000	Tommy Cheung	Liberal
2004	Tommy Cheung	Liberal
2008	Tommy Cheung	Liberal
2012	Tommy Cheung	Liberal
2016	Tommy Cheung	Liberal
2021	Tommy Cheung	Liberal
2025	Jonathan Leung	Liberal

== Electoral results ==
=== 2020s ===
2025 Legislative Council election: Catering
Party	Candidate	Votes	%	±%
Liberal	Jonathan Leung Chun	101	82.11	+3.2
Independent	Maurice Kong Chi-hang	22	17.89	
Majority		75	64.22	
Total valid votes		123	100.00	
Rejected ballots		1		
Turnout		124	96.12	+5.34
Registered electors		129		
Liberal hold		Swing		

2021 Legislative Council election: Catering
Party	Candidate	Votes	%	±%
Liberal	Tommy Cheung Yu-yan	101	78.91	−0.12
Independent	Rayman Chui Man-wai	27	21.09	
Majority		74	57.82	−0.24
Total valid votes		128	100.00	
Rejected ballots		0		
Turnout		128	90.78	+32.09
Registered electors		141		
Liberal hold		Swing		

=== 2010s ===
2016 Hong Kong legislative election: Catering
Party	Candidate	Votes	%	±%
Liberal	Tommy Cheung Yu-yan	2,438	79.03	
Independent	Ng Wing-tak	647	20.97	
Majority		1,791	58.06	
Total valid votes		3,085	100.00	
Rejected ballots		134		
Turnout		3,219	58.69	
Registered electors		5,485		
Liberal hold		Swing		

2012 Hong Kong legislative election: Catering
Party	Candidate	Votes	%	±%
Liberal	Tommy Cheung Yu-yan	Unopposed		
Registered electors		7,797		
Liberal hold		Swing		

=== 2000s ===
2008 Hong Kong legislative election: Catering
Party	Candidate	Votes	%	±%
Liberal	Tommy Cheung Yu-yan	Unopposed		
Registered electors		8,149		
Liberal hold		Swing		

2004 Hong Kong legislative election: Catering
Party	Candidate	Votes	%	±%
Liberal	Tommy Cheung Yu-yan	2,488	63.75	+10.16
Democratic	Josephine Chan Shu-ying	849	21.75	
Independent	Wong Sin-ying	566	14.50	
Majority		1,639	42.00	
Total valid votes		3,903	100.00	
Rejected ballots		186		
Turnout		4,089	52.52	
Registered electors		7,786		
Liberal hold		Swing		

2000 Hong Kong legislative election: Catering
Party	Candidate	Votes	%	±%
Liberal	Tommy Cheung Yu-yan	1,478	53.59	
Independent	Leung Kwong-cheong	720	26.11	
DAB	Ng Tak-leung	560	20.3	
Majority		758	27.48	
Total valid votes		2,758	100.00	
Rejected ballots		114		
Turnout		2,872	41.25	
Registered electors		6,963		
Liberal win (new seat)				
