= Transport (constituency) =

Hong Kong functional constituency

Transport 航運交通界
- Functional constituency for the Legislative Council of Hong Kong
- Region: Hong Kong
- Electorate: 217

Current constituency
- Created: 1998
- Number of members: One
- Member: Lothair Lam (Independent)
- Created from: Transport and Communication

The Transport functional constituency (Chinese: 航運交通界功能界別) is a functional constituency in the elections for the Legislative Council of Hong Kong. 195 electors are only limited to 201 transport associations.

A similar Transport and Communication functional constituency was created for the 1995 election by Governor Chris Patten with a much larger electorate base of total 109,716 eligible voters.

== Return members ==
Election	Member	Party
1998	Miriam Lau	Liberal
2000	Miriam Lau	Liberal
2004	Miriam Lau	Liberal
2008	Miriam Lau	Liberal
2012	Frankie Yick	Liberal
2016	Frankie Yick	Liberal
2021	Frankie Yick	Liberal
2025	Lothair Lam	Independent

== Electoral results ==
Instant-runoff voting system is used from 1998 to 2021. Since 2021, first-past-the-post voting system is in use.

=== 2020s ===
2025 Legislative Council election: Transport
Party	Candidate	Votes	%	±%
Independent	Lothair Lam Ming-fung	162	85.71	
Independent	Feng Jiapei	27	14.29	
Majority		135	71.42	
Total valid votes		189	100.00	
Rejected ballots		3		
Turnout		192	88.48	−3.38
Registered electors		217		
Independent gain from Liberal		Swing		

2021 Legislative Council election: Transport
Party	Candidate	Votes	%	±%
Liberal	Frankie Yick Chi-ming	147	72.41	
Independent	Alan Chan Chung-yee	56	27.59	
Majority		91	44.82	
Total valid votes		203	100.00	
Rejected ballots		0		
Turnout		203	91.86	
Registered electors		223		
Liberal hold		Swing		

=== 2010s ===
2016 Hong Kong legislative election: Transport
Party	Candidate	Votes	%	±%
Liberal	Frankie Yick Chi-ming	127	75.15	–19.08
Independent	Yau Ying-wah	42	24.84	
Majority		85	50.31	
Total valid votes		169	100.00	
Rejected ballots		7		
Turnout		176	91.67	
Registered electors		192		
Liberal hold		Swing		

2012 Hong Kong legislative election: Transport
Party	Candidate	Votes	%	±%
Liberal	Frankie Yick Chi-ming	Unopposed		
Registered electors		204		
Liberal hold		Swing		

=== 2000s ===
2008 Hong Kong legislative election: Transport
Party	Candidate	Votes	%	±%
Liberal	Miriam Lau Kin-yee	147	94.23	
Independent	Tam Chi-wah	9	5.77	
Majority		138	88.46	
Total valid votes		156	100.00	
Rejected ballots		5		
Turnout		161	90.45	
Registered electors		178		
Liberal hold		Swing		

2004 Hong Kong legislative election: Transport
Party	Candidate	Votes	%	±%
Liberal	Miriam Lau Kin-yee	Unopposed		
Registered electors		182		
Liberal hold		Swing		

2000 Hong Kong legislative election: Transport
Party	Candidate	Votes	%	±%
Liberal	Miriam Lau Kin-yee	106	76.26	+6.77
DAB	Thomas Pang Cheung-wai	33	23.74	
Majority		73	52.52	
Total valid votes		139	100.00	
Rejected ballots		5		
Turnout		144	94.74	
Registered electors		152		
Liberal hold		Swing		

=== 1990s ===
1998 Hong Kong legislative election: Transport
Party	Candidate	Votes	%	±%
Liberal	Miriam Lau Kin-yee	82	69.49	
Independent	Yuen Mo	36	30.51	
Majority		46	38.98	
Total valid votes		118	100.00	
Rejected ballots		13		
Turnout		131	95.62	
Registered electors		137		
Liberal win (new seat)				
