= Wholesale and Retail (constituency) =

Hong Kong functional constituency

Wholesale and Retail 批發及零售界
- Functional constituency for the Legislative Council of Hong Kong
- Region: Hong Kong
- Electorate: 1,673

Current constituency
- Created: 1995
- Number of members: One
- Member: Shiu Ka-fai (Liberal)

The Wholesale and Retail functional constituency (Chinese: 批發及零售界功能界別) is a functional constituency in the elections for the Legislative Council of Hong Kong first created in 1995 as one of the nine new functional constituencies under the electoral reform carried out by the then Governor Chris Patten, in which the electorate consisted of total 101,988 eligible voters worked related to the wholesale and retail industry.

The constituency was abolished with the colonial Legislative Council dissolved after the transfer of the sovereignty in 1997. The constituency was recreated for the 1998 Legislative Council election unless its electorate base has been narrowed and from individual voting to bodies that are members of 82 wholesale and retail associations. After the major electoral overhaul in 2021, the registered voters were scrapped from 6,104 to 2,015 corporate members of the 99 wholesale and retail associations.

Since its creation, it has been controlled by the Liberal Party and currently represented by Shiu Ka-fai.

== Return members ==
Election	Member	Party
1995	Selina Chow	Liberal
Not represented in PLC (1997–1998)
1998	Selina Chow	Liberal
2000	Selina Chow	Liberal
2004	Vincent Fang	Liberal
2008	Vincent Fang	Liberal
2012	Vincent Fang	Liberal
2016	Shiu Ka-fai	Liberal
2021	Shiu Ka-fai	Liberal
2025	Shiu Ka-fai	Liberal

== Electoral results ==
=== 2020s ===
2025 Legislative Council election: Wholesale and Retail
Party	Candidate	Votes	%	±%
Liberal	Shiu Ka-fai	827	84.73	−6.15
Independent	Annie Tse Yau	149	15.27	
Majority		678	67.46	
Total valid votes		976	100.00	
Rejected ballots		29		
Turnout		1,005	60.07	−5.23
Registered electors		1,673		
Liberal hold		Swing		

2021 Legislative Council election: Wholesale and Retail
Party	Candidate	Votes	%	±%
Liberal	Shiu Ka-fai	1,116	90.88	+25.84
Independent	Lam Chi-wing	112	9.12	
Majority		1,004	81.76	+51.68
Total valid votes		1,228	100.00	
Rejected ballots		18		
Turnout		1,246	65.30	+7.18
Registered electors		2,015		
Liberal hold		Swing		

=== 2010s ===
2016 Legislative Council election: Wholesale and Retail
Party	Candidate	Votes	%	±%
Liberal	Shiu Ka-fai	2,290	65.04	
Democratic	Au Nok-hin	1,231	34.96	
Majority		1,059	30.08	
Total valid votes		3,521	100.00	
Rejected ballots		282		
Turnout		3,803	58.12	+2.97
Registered electors		6,543		
Liberal hold		Swing		

2012 Legislative Council election: Wholesale and Retail
Party	Candidate	Votes	%	±%
Liberal	Vincent Fang Kang	Unopposed		
Registered electors		7,242		
Liberal hold		Swing		

=== 2000s ===
2008 Legislative Council election: Wholesale and Retail
Party	Candidate	Votes	%	±%
Liberal	Vincent Fang Kang	1,907	64.73	+17.88
Independent	Chiu Chun-kwok	1,039	35.27	
Majority		868	29.46	
Total valid votes		2,946	100.00	
Rejected ballots		185		
Turnout		3,131	55.15	−7.59
Registered electors		6,074		
Liberal hold		Swing		

2004 Legislative Council election: Wholesale and Retail
Party	Candidate	Votes	%	±%
Liberal	Vincent Fang Kang	1,145	46.85	−28.55
Independent	Fung Leung-lo	896	36.66	
Ind. democrat	Samuel Chan Tim-shing	403	16.49	
Majority		249	10.19	
Total valid votes		2,946	100.00	
Rejected ballots		502		
Turnout		2,549	62.74	
Registered electors		4,063		
Liberal hold		Swing		

2000 Legislative Council election: Wholesale and Retail
Party	Candidate	Votes	%	±%
Liberal	Selina Chow Liang Shuk-yee	1,459	75.40	+8.99
DAB	Lau Chi-wing	476	24.60	
Majority		983	50.80	
Total valid votes		1,935	100.00	
Rejected ballots		57		
Turnout		1,992	60.33	
Registered electors		3,375		
Liberal hold		Swing		

=== 1990s ===
1998 Legislative Council election: Wholesale and Retail
Party	Candidate	Votes	%	±%
Liberal	Selina Chow Liang Shuk-yee	945	66.41	−1.64
HKPA	Wong Siu-yee	276	19.40	
Independent	Chan Choi-hi	202	14.19	
Majority		669	47.01	
Total valid votes		1,423	100.00	
Rejected ballots		33		
Turnout		1,456	67.56	
Registered electors		2,155		
Liberal hold		Swing		

1995 Legislative Council election: Wholesale and Retail
Party	Candidate	Votes	%	±%
Liberal	Selina Chow Liang Shuk-yee	23,357	68.05	
DAB	Wong Kwok-hing	10,965	31.95	
Majority		12,392	36.10	
Total valid votes		34,322	100.00	
Rejected ballots		2,724		
Turnout		37,046	36.32	
Registered electors		101,988		
Liberal win (new seat)				
