= Miriam Lau =

Hong Kong politician and lawyer

Miriam Lau Kin-yee GBS OBE JP
- 劉健儀
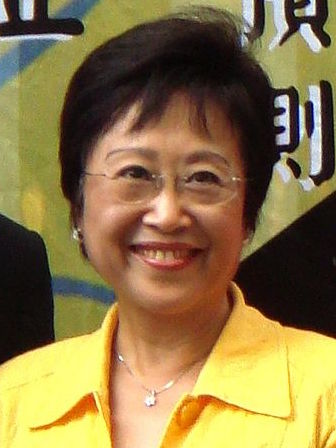

Chairwoman of the Liberal Party
- In office 8 September 2008 – 9 September 2012
- Preceded by: James Tien
- Succeeded by: Vincent Fang (acting)

Member of the Legislative Council of Hong Kong
- In office 2 July 1998 – 16 July 2012
- Preceded by: New parliament
- Succeeded by: Frankie Yick
- Constituency: Transport
- In office 22 February 1997 – 8 April 1998
- Constituency: Provisional Legislative Council
- In office 11 October 1995 – 27 June 1997
- Preceded by: New constituency
- Succeeded by: Replaced by Provisional Legislative Council
- Constituency: Transport & Communication
- In office 22 September 1988 – 17 September 1995
- Appointed by: Sir David Wilson
- Constituency: Appointed

Personal details
- Born: 27 April 1947 (age 79) Guangzhou, Canton, China
- Party: Liberal Party (1993–2022)
- Spouse: Alfred Lau Tit-hon (m. 1979; div. 2001)
- Education: University of Hong Kong; University of East Asia
- Occupation: Legislative Councillor solicitor

Miriam Lau Kin-yee
- Traditional Chinese: 劉健儀
- Simplified Chinese: 刘健仪
Transcriptions
Standard Mandarin
- Hanyu Pinyin: Liú Jiànyí
Yue: Cantonese
- Yale Romanization: Làuh Gihn Yìh
- Jyutping: Lau^{4} Gin^{6}ji^{4}

Miriam Lau Kin-yee GBS OBE JP (Chinese: 劉健儀, born 27 April 1947) is a Hong Kong lawyer and former politician who served as a member of the Legislative Council of Hong Kong from 1988 to 2012, first as an appointee of the Governor from 1988 to 1995, and subsequently as the representative of the transport industry functional constituency from 1995 to 2012.

Lau served as the Chairman of the House Committee from 2003 to 2012, and often presided over debates as Deputy President in the absence of Rita Fan and Jasper Tsang.

== Early life and education ==
Miriam Lau was born on 27 April 1947 in Guangzhou, China to a working-class family, moving to Hong Kong at a young age and settling in subdivided flat in Sham Shui Po. She studied at Maryknoll Convent School and later graduated from the University of Hong Kong in 1968 with a Bachelor of Arts degree in English with second-class honours.

== Legal career ==
Lau was admitted as a solicitor in Hong Kong in March 1977, and was subsequently admitted to practice in England and Wales in July 1981. She was with the law firm of Alfred Lau, her ex-husband, from 1979 to 2001. Lau currently is a consultant with the law firm King & Wood Mallesons, specialising in litigation.

== Political career ==
Lau entered politics in 1985 as an appointed member of the Urban Council, serving until 1991.

Lau was the chairwoman of the Liberal Party after James Tien's resignation following the party's poor performance in the 2008 Hong Kong legislative election until 2012, when she stood down for the same reason: in that election, the party secured only 2.64 percent of the popular vote. She also lost her own seat, having stood in the geographical constituency of Hong Kong Island, rather than in the (safer) option of her existing functional constituency.

Lau resigned from the Liberal Party in 2022 along with former chairman and leader James Tien and Selina Chow, in protest of the new leadership's decision to abolish the position of honorary chairman.

== Personal life ==
Lau is Catholic and has one child. She was previously married to Alfred Lau, a lawyer, from 1979 to 2001.

== Honours ==
- Justice of the Peace (1991)
- Officer of the Most Excellent Order of the British Empire (1992)
- Golden Bauhinia Star (2004)

== See also ==
- Politics of Hong Kong

Legislative Council of Hong Kong
New constituency	Member of Legislative Council; Representative for Transport and Communication; 1995–1997	Replaced by Provisional Legislative Council
New parliament	Member of Provisional Legislative Council; 1997–1998	Replaced by Legislative Council
New parliament	Member of Legislative Council; Representative for Transport; 1998–2012	Succeeded by Frankie Yick
Preceded by Selina Chow	Chairman of House Committee; 2003–2012	Succeeded by Andrew Leung
Party political offices
Preceded by Ronald Arculli	Vice-Chairperson of the Liberal Party; 2000–2008; Served alongside: Selina Chow	Succeeded by Vincent Fang
Preceded by James Tien	Chairperson of the Liberal Party; 2008–2012	Succeeded by Vincent Fang as Acting chairman
Honorary titles
Preceded by James Tien	Honorary Chairperson of the Liberal Party; 2012–present	Incumbent
Order of precedence
Preceded by Timothy Fok; Recipients of the Gold Bauhinia Star	Hong Kong order of precedence Recipients of the Gold Bauhinia Star	Succeeded by Haider Barma; Recipients of the Gold Bauhinia Star
