= Sophie Leung =

Hong Kong politician (born 1945)

Sophie Leung Lau Yau-fun GBS, JP
- 梁劉柔芬
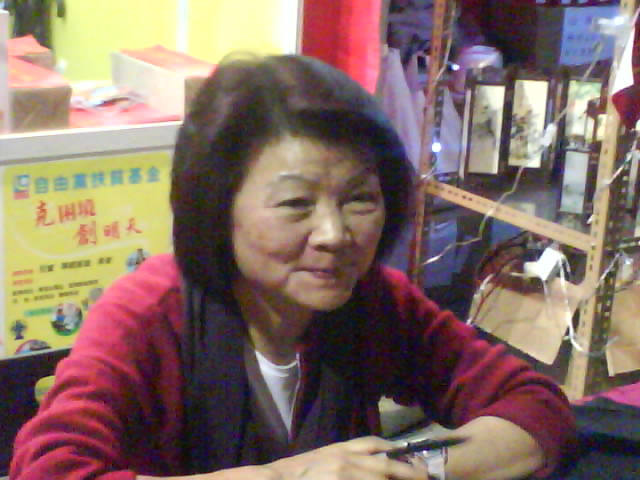

Member of the Legislative Council
- In office 1 July 1998 – 30 September 2012
- Preceded by: New parliament
- Succeeded by: Felix Chung
- Constituency: Textiles and Garment
- In office 21 December 1996 – 30 June 1998 (Provisional Legislative Council)

Personal details
- Born: Lau Yau-fun; 9 October 1945 (age 80) Macau
- Other political affiliations: Liberal Party (quit 2008)
- Spouse: Brian Leung Hung-tak
- Children: Nisa Leung Wing-yu
- Education: University of Illinois Urbana-Champaign
- Occupation: Company director

Sophie Leung Lau Yau-fun, OBE, GBS, JP (Chinese: 梁劉柔芬; born 9 October 1945, Macau) is a Hong Kong politician. She was a Member of the Legislative Council from 1996 to 2012, representing the textile and garment industry, and became a Deputy of the National People's Congress of the People's Republic of China in 2003.

== Career ==
She has been a director since the 1970s of large textile conglomerates in Hong Kong with businesses extending globally, together with her husband, Brian Leung Hung-tak zh:梁孔德, chairman of the Hong Kong Football Association. She founded Seattle Pacific Industries, a privately held company, which manufactures, markets, and distributes casual wear under its labels such as Union Bay and Sergio Valente in the United States with annual sales of over US$200 million. Casual wear-bearing fashion labels owned by Seattle Pacific Industries are sold in over 3,000 outlets in the United States, including department stores such as Macy's, Nordstrom, Neiman Marcus, and JC Penney.

== Legislation ==
- HKSAR Deputy, 12th Of National People's Congress, PRC (2013–17)
- Councillor, Fourth Term of The Legislative Council of Hong Kong Special Administrative Region (2008–2012)
- Member of Finance Committee (2008–2012)
- Chairman, Committee on Members' Interests, Legislative Council (2008–2012)
- Member, Panel on Commerce and Industry, Legislative Council (2008–2012)
- Member, Panel on Constitutional Affairs, Legislative Council (2008–2012)
- Member of Panel on Development (2008–2012)
- Member of Panel on Housing (2010–2012)
- Member, Subcommittee on Parliamentary Liaison Subcommittee (2008–2012)

== Personal life ==
Leung received a bachelor of science in mathematics in 1969 from the University of Illinois Urbana-Champaign. She is married with three children.

Legislative Council of Hong Kong
New parliament	Member of Provisional Legislative Council; 1997–1998	Replaced by Legislative Council
New parliament	Member of Legislative Council; Representative for Textiles and Garment; 1998–2012	Succeeded by Felix Chung
Order of precedence
Preceded by Shelley Lee; Recipients of the Gold Bauhinia Star	Hong Kong order of precedence Recipients of the Gold Bauhinia Star	Succeeded by Ho Sai-chu; Recipients of the Gold Bauhinia Star
