= Textiles and Garment (constituency) =

Hong Kong functional constituency

Textiles and Garment 紡織及製衣界
- Functional constituency for the Legislative Council of Hong Kong
- Region: Hong Kong
- Electorate: 237

Current constituency
- Created: 1995
- Number of members: One
- Member: Sunny Tan (BPA)

The Textiles and Garment functional constituency (Chinese: 紡織及製衣界功能界別) is a functional constituency in the elections for the Legislative Council of Hong Kong, first created in 1995 as one of the nine new functional constituencies under the electoral reform, carried out by the then Governor Chris Patten in which the electorate consisted of total 60,568 eligible voters related to the textile and garment industry. It was abolished by the colonial Legislative Council and dissolved after the transfer of the sovereignty in 1997.

The constituency was recreated for the 1998 Legislative Council election unless its electorate base has been narrowed which is composed of textiles and garment associations and traders only. After a major electoral overhaul in 2021, the registered voters are restricted from 1,607 in 2016 to 348 corporate voters of the designated associations.

== Composition ==
The Textiles and Garment functional constituency is composed of—

- corporate members of the Textile Council of Hong Kong Limited entitled to vote at general meetings of the council; and
- corporate members of each of the following bodies entitled to vote at general meetings of the body—
  - The Federation of Hong Kong Cotton Weavers;
  - The Federation of Hong Kong Garment Manufacturers;
  - Hong Kong Chinese Textile Mills Association;
  - The Hongkong Cotton Spinners Association;
  - Hong Kong Garment Manufacturers Association Ltd.;
  - Hongkong Knitwear Exporters & Manufacturers Association Limited; (Amended 11 of 2019 s. 5)
  - Hong Kong Woollen & Synthetic Knitting Manufacturers’ Association Ltd.;
  - The Hong Kong Association of Textile Bleachers, Dyers, Printers and Finishers Limited;
  - The Hong Kong Weaving Mills Association;
  - The Hong Kong General Chamber of Textiles Limited.

== Return members ==
Election	Member	Party
1995	Leung Yiu-chung	Independent (NWSC)→Frontier
Not represented in the PLC (1997–1998)
1998	Sophie Leung	Liberal
2000	Sophie Leung	Liberal
2004	Sophie Leung	Liberal
2008	Sophie Leung	Liberal→Independent→Economic Synergy
2012	Felix Chung	Liberal
2016	Felix Chung	Liberal
2021	Sunny Tan	Independent→BPA
2025	Sunny Tan	BPA

== Electoral results ==
=== 2020s ===
2025 Legislative Council election: Textiles and Garment
Party	Candidate	Votes	%	±%
BPA	Sunny Tan	202	87.45	+19.73
Independent	Shiu King-wah	29	12.55	
Majority		173	74.90	
Total valid votes		231	100.00	
Rejected ballots		6		
Turnout		237	73.60	−5.66
Registered electors		322		
BPA hold		Swing		

2021 Legislative Council election: Textiles and Garment
Party	Candidate	Votes	%	±%
Independent	Sunny Tan	172	67.72	
Liberal	Chung Kwok-pan	82	32.28	−43.64
Majority		90	35.44	−16.40
Total valid votes		254	100.00	
Rejected ballots		2		
Turnout		256	79.26	+5.47
Registered electors		348		
Independent gain from Liberal		Swing		

=== 2010s ===
2016 Legislative Council election: Textiles and Garment
Party	Candidate	Votes	%	±%
Liberal	Chung Kwok-pan	1,138	75.92	+19.85
Independent	Kenny Yang Si-kit	361	24.08	
Majority		777	51.84	
Total valid votes		1,499	100.00	
Rejected ballots		52		
Turnout		1,551	73.79	+0.93
Registered electors		2,102		
Liberal hold		Swing		

2012 Legislative Council election: Textiles and Garment
Party	Candidate	Votes	%	±%
Liberal	Chung Kwok-pan	1,076	56.07	+19.91
Independent	Henry Tan	843	43.93	
Majority		233	100.00	
Total valid votes		1,919	100.00	
Rejected ballots		153		
Turnout		2,072	72.86	+17.31
Registered electors		2,844		
Liberal gain from Economic Synergy		Swing		

=== 2000s ===
2008 Legislative Council election: Textiles and Garment
Party	Candidate	Votes	%	±%
Liberal	Sophie Leung Lau Yau-fun	1,255	63.84	−14.10
Independent	Chung Kwok-pan	711	36.16	
Majority		544	27.68	
Total valid votes		1,966	100.00	
Rejected ballots		95		
Turnout		2,061	55.55	
Registered electors		3,710		
Liberal hold		Swing		

2004 Legislative Council election: Textiles and Garment
Party	Candidate	Votes	%	±%
Liberal	Sophie Leung Lau Yau-fun	1,816	77.94	
Independent	Kwan Kam-yuen	514	22.06	
Majority		1,302	55.88	
Total valid votes		2,330	100.00	
Rejected ballots		100		
Turnout		2,430	62.40	
Registered electors		3,894		
Liberal hold		Swing		

2000 Legislative Council election: Textiles and Garment
Party	Candidate	Votes	%	±%
Liberal	Sophie Leung Lau Yau-fun	Unopposed		
Registered electors		4,697		
Liberal hold		Swing		

=== 1990s ===
1998 Legislative Council election: Textiles and Garment
Party	Candidate	Votes	%	±%
Liberal	Sophie Leung Lau Yau-fun	Unopposed		
Registered electors		2,739		
Liberal win (new seat)				

1995 Legislative Council election: Textiles and Garment
Party	Candidate	Votes	%	±%
Independent	Leung Yiu-chung	10,472	49.44	
FTU	Chan Kwok-keung	5,116	24.15	
Independent	Ng Ching-man	2,957	13.96	
LDF	Chan Ming-kit	2,638	12.45	
Majority		5,356	25.29	
Total valid votes		21,183	100.00	
Rejected ballots		1,941		
Turnout		23,124	38.18	
Registered electors		60,568		
Independent win (new seat)				
