= Jiangsu Expressway Company =

Chinese road maintenance company

Jiangsu Expressway Company Limited 江蘇寧滬高速公路股份有限公司
- Type: State-owned enterprise
- Industry: Road construction and operations
- Founded: 1992
- Headquarters: Nanjing, Jiangsu, People's Republic of China
- Area served: China
- Key people: Chairman: Mr. Shen Changquan
- Website: www.jsexpressway.com

Jiangsu Expressway Company Limited (SEHK: 177, SSE: 600377) is a road construction and operations enterprise incorporated in the People's Republic of China. It is engaged in the investment, construction, operation and management of toll expressways in Jiangsu Province, China. The expressways include Shanghai-Nanjing Expressway, Shanghai-Nanjing section of China National Highway 312, Xicheng Expressway, Guangjing Expressway, Nanjing section of Nanjing-Lianyungang Expressway, Jiangsu section of the Sujiahang Expressway and Jiangyin Yangtze River Bridge.
