= Liberal Party (Hong Kong) =

Political party in Hong Kong

Liberal Party 自由黨
- Chairman: Peter Shiu
- Vice-Chairmen: Nicholas Chan; Alan Hoo; Lee Chun-keung
- Founded: 6 June 1993; 33 years ago
- Preceded by: Co-operative; Resources Centre
- Headquarters: 2/F New Hennessy; Tower, 263 Hennessy; Road, Wan Chai, Hong Kong
- Youth wing: Liberal Party; Youth Committee
- Membership (2017): ▲ ~500
- Ideology: Conservatism (HK); Economic liberalism; Liberal conservatism
- Political position: Centre-right
- Regional affiliation: Pro-Beijing camp
- Colours: Blue and green Yellow (formerly)
- Executive Council: 1 / 33
- Legislative Council: 4 / 90
- District Councils: 8 / 470
- NPC (HK deputies): 1 / 36
- CPPCC (HK members): 4 / 124

Website
- www.liberal.org.hk

Liberal Party
- Traditional Chinese: 自由黨
- Simplified Chinese: 自由党
Transcriptions
Standard Mandarin
- Hanyu Pinyin: Zìyóu dǎng
Yue: Cantonese
- Yale Romanization: Jih yàuh dóng
- Jyutping: Zi^{6} jau^{4} dong^{2}

The Liberal Party (LP) is a pro-Beijing, pro-business, and conservative political party in Hong Kong. Led by Tommy Cheung and chaired by Peter Shiu, it currently holds four seats in the Legislative Council, and holds eight seats in the District Councils.

Founded in 1993 on the basis of the Co-operative Resources Centre, the Liberal Party was founded by a group of conservative politicians, businessmen and professionals who were either appointed by the colonial governor or indirectly elected through the trade-based functional constituencies, to counter the liberal United Democrats of Hong Kong who emerged from the first Legislative Council direct election in 1991.

Led by Allen Lee, the party adopted a friendly approach with the Beijing authorities to oppose last governor Chris Patten's constitutional reform proposal in the final colonial years. Enjoyed by the advantage in the narrowly franchised functional constituencies, the Liberals remained a major party and a governing ally of the SAR administration in the early post-handover era, despite its chairman Allen Lee's failed attempt in the direct election.

The Liberal popularity rose to its peak in 2003 when party chairman James Tien broke away from the government to voice against the Basic Law Article 23 which eventually brought down the proposed bill. The Liberal Party enjoyed an electoral success in the 2004 Legislative Council election where James Tien and vice chairwoman Selina Chow both won a seat in the direct election, bringing the party 10 seats in the legislature. Although the Liberal Party sits with the pro-establishment camp in the Legislative Council, it took a more ambiguous and sometimes rebellious stance against the SAR government under Tien's more moderate leadership and was called a "wall-rider" party in Hong Kong political discourse for swaying between supporting the pro-Beijing SAR administration and the voters on certain issues.

The party lost both of its directly elected seats in the 2008 Legislative Council election and led to the split within the party where four of its seven legislators left the party. In the 2012 Chief Executive election, the Liberals openly opposed Leung Chun-ying who became the eventual winner with Beijing's blessing. The party was then increasingly sidelined by the administration. In 2014, party leader James Tien was unseated from CPPCC for asking Leung to step down.

The Liberals lost their only directly elected seat when Tien retired in 2016, dwindling to four seats in the legislature. The party was divided in the 2017 Chief Executive election when the wing led by former party leader James Tien supported Financial Secretary John Tsang while the wing led by party chairman and Executive Councillor Tommy Cheung voted for Chief Secretary Carrie Lam who was Beijing's favourite. The party became further polarized over the proposed extradition bill controversy and the 9 June protest with Tien's faction wanting to scrap the bill and calling for Lam's resignation while the new Liberal Party leadership expressed their support for Lam. Some members of Tien's moderate faction founded the Hope for Hong Kong organisation to explore a middle ground between the pro-Beijing and pro-democracy camps. Tien's faction were later forced out from the party when the central committee decided to scrap the titles of honorary chairperson in August 2022.

== Party beliefs ==
Formed by businessmen and tycoons from various business sectors in Hong Kong, the Liberal Party is considered conservative and pro-business. In reference to the Liberal Party name, founding chairman Allen Lee said that "liberalism" would be the party's cherished ideal, with its values being free enterprise, equal opportunity, and individual freedom, but it expounds liberal conservative economic policies such as opposition to a minimum wage, collective bargaining and antitrust legislation. The Liberals also support limited government, low taxes, a high degree of economic freedom and uphold the interests of small and medium enterprises. Early on, the Liberal Party was close to the British administration with some of the party's founders being appointed to roles within the colonial government. However, the party shifted towards the pro-Beijing camp in the run-up to the handover of Hong Kong due to electoral reforms enacted by the British administration and the rise of the pro-democracy camp which the party claimed would threaten a smooth transition of power and economic relations with mainland China.

The party does not advocate welfare entitlements. Many of its members are from professionals, the merchant and business sectors and see preserving the current state of economic freedom as most advantageous for Hong Kong as a whole. The party adheres to social conservatism and opposes same-sex marriage. The party supported the functional constituency which represented the business interest that they should stay in the Legislative Council.

Despite being regarded as part of the pro-Beijing camp, the relations between Liberal Party and Hong Kong SAR government is not extremely friendly and the party has not shied away from criticising SAR administrations on some measures. Its chairman James Tien's resignation from the Executive Council in 2003 forced the government to back down from legislation of Article 23 of the Basic Law, which ultimately accelerated the downfall of the Tung Chee-hwa administration. It has remained critical of the government of Chief Executive Leung Chun-ying who won in the 2012 chief executive election, which the Liberal Party supported Leung's rival Henry Tang and cast blank votes instead of voting for Leung. On some issues, the Liberal Party has either adopted a neutral stance or has swung between supporting the pro-Beijing camp and voters, prompting dissatisfied responses from both sides although the party has generally positioned itself as supportive of the SAR government. After Carrie Lam was elected as Chief Executive, the party was accused of growing closer to the government and further from the founding members of the party and the leadership of James Tien. During the 2019–2020 Hong Kong protests the party was divided on whether to support the 2019 Hong Kong extradition bill, with former party leader Felix Chung arguing the SAR government should not rush into passing such a legislation while Tommy Cheung supported it. Others such as Tien argued for Lam to resign as Chief Executive. Due to its history of rebelling against the government, it is also seen as maverick in the pro-Beijing camp.

== History ==
=== Background ===
The Liberal Party was founded on the basis of a loose political grouping Co-operative Resources Centre (CRC) in 1993. The Co-operative Resources Centre was formed by the conservative faction in the Legislative Council (LegCo) as a counter-force to the new emerged pro-democratic United Democrats of Hong Kong who won a landslide victory in the first Legislative Council direct elections in 1991. Led by the Senior Unofficial Member Allen Lee and his fellow LegCo colleagues, Steven Poon, Selina Chow and Stephen Cheong, 12 legislators appointed by the British colonial government and 8 legislators indirectly elected by the functional constituencies aligned themselves and formed the CRC as a think tank, research unit and brain trust for a future political group. Four of the legislative council members, Allen Lee, Selina Chow, Rita Fan and Edward Ho had also been appointed members of the Executive Council (ExCo). This group of conservative elites shared a dislike for the United Democrats but lacked a common philosophy and ambition. Sir Sze Yuen Chung, the former senior unofficial member of the executive and legislative councils, suggested Lee and Poon to abandon any pretense of being above politics and form a proper political party with its belief, vision, discipline and platform.

=== Founding and Allen Lee chairmanship (1993–1998) ===
First logo used from 1993 to 2004

The Liberal Party was officially launched on 6 June 1993 with Allen Lee and Ronald Arculli as the first chairman and vice-chairman. The party was originally considered close to the British colonial administration in part due to its scepticism of expanding universal suffrage, but wishing to see a smooth transition of sovereignty over Hong Kong, the Liberal Party strongly opposed Governor Chris Patten's democratic reform as it was seen as a violation Sino-British Joint Declaration by the PRC government and began to align itself more to the pro-Beijing camp as a result. The Liberal Party offered an amendment to the reform package known as the "1994 Plan" which was supported by Beijing, but this was defeated in the legislative council.

The Liberal Party fielded candidates for the first time in the 1994 District Board elections, reaping 18 seats. In the 1995 Legislative Council election, Chairman Allen Lee successfully gained the party's first seat in the New Territories North-east direct election with nine other seats gained in the indirect functional constituency elections, focused on business interests. The party has maintained its unbalanced advantages in the business sector's indirect elections in functional constituencies while having few success in the popular direct elections in geographical constituencies. During the last years of British rule and early years of the SAR administration, the party remained one of the three largest in Legco, behind the pro-democratic Democratic Party and ahead of the Beijing-loyalist Democratic Alliance for the Betterment of Hong Kong (DAB).

In January 1996, Allen Lee, Lau Wong-fat, Howard Young and Ngai Shiu-kit were invited by the Beijing government to the Preparatory Committee for the Hong Kong SAR. Fourteen Liberal Party members including Allen Lee, Ronald Arculli and James Tien subsequently became members of the 400-member Selection Committee which was responsible for electing the first chief executive of Hong Kong and the Provisional Legislative Council (PLC) in November. 10 members were elected to the Provisional Legislative Council and member Henry Tang was also appointed to the Provisional Executive Council by Chief Executive-elect Tung Chee-hwa in December 1996.

In May 1998, the Liberal Party participated in the first Legislative Council election after the handover, although the party won all of its 10 seats in the functional constituency and Election Committee indirect elections, Chairman Allen Lee lost in the New Territories East direct election. Lee decided not to run in 2000 and resigned as chairman in December. James Tien succeeded Lee as the new chairman and Arculli and Selina Chow were elected vice-chairmen.

=== James Tien chairmanship and 2003 crisis (1998–2003) ===
In the 1999 District Council elections, the Liberal Party won 16 elected seats, with James Tien and Howard Young elected in the Peak and Bays Area. The party also had 9 appointed seats and 2 ex officio seats, including chairman of the Tuen Mun Rural Committee Lau Wong-fat as the ex officio member of the Tuen Mun District Council. In the 2000 Legislative Council elections, 7 Liberal Party legislators were elected, with Tommy Cheung winning in the new Catering functional constituency. In September 2000, Miriam Lau became party's vice-chairwoman after Ronald Arcullli announced that he would not run in the next legislative council elections and resigned as vice-chairman.

The Liberal Party had been the ally of the Tung Chee-hwa's administration. In March 2000, Vice-chairwoman Selina Chow was appointed chair of the Hong Kong Tourist Association, which was later transformed into the Hong Kong Tourism Board. The Tourist Board was regarded as the fiefdom of the Liberals. After Selina Chow stepped down in 2007, James Tien was appointed by Donald Tsang to succeed her as the chair of the board. In July 2002 when chief executive Tung Chee-hwa carried out the Principal Officials Accountability System (POAS) in the beginning of his second term. Party chairman James Tien was appointed to the executive council alongside the DAB chairman Tsang Yok-sing as the coalition of the Tung administration. The former Liberal Party's ExCo member Henry Tang was appointed Secretary for Commerce, Industry and Technology. However the governing coalition between Tung Chee-hwa the Beijing-loyalist DAB and the pro-business Liberal Party suffered from growing disunity as the popularity of Tung administration dropped. The Liberal Party was increasingly frustrated by unequal political exchange with the government and the skimpy political rewards meted out by Tung. James Tien even openly aired his displeasure and advocated power sharing with the government.

In September 2002, the SAR government issued the consultation document for the national security legislation to implement the Article 23 of the Basic Law, which outlaws treason, sedition, subversion and secession against the central government. The Liberal Party agreed the principle of safeguarding the national security but suggested amendments to the bill. After a record-breaking number of people demonstrated on 1 July 2003 against the Article 23, James Tien resigned from the executive council on 6 July 2003 to force the government to delay the legislation. Without Liberal Party's support, the government was forced to shelve the second reading because of short of votes in the legislative council. This exception to the party's usual pro-government policy was popular and temporarily calmed friction between pro-government and the pro-democracy forces. Some pro-Beijing leftists, however, felt that this demonstrated the opportunistic nature of the party. In September 2003, Tung Chee-hwa appointed Selina Chow to Executive Council to replace Tien's vacancy.

=== Liberal surge (2003–2008) ===
Second logo used from 2003 to 2011

In Liberal Party's visit to Beijing in September 2003, the party expressed its opinion on Article 23 and its support to the SAR government. It subsequently changed its party logo and slogan, adding the red colour to express its patriotic sentiment. At almost the same time, the Liberal Party shifted its stance on political development from "all Legislative Council members should be directly elected in 2007" to "Hong Kong should become more democratic." The founder and ex-chair of Liberal Party, Allen Lee, decided to leave the party since he believed the change was against public sentiment. The party's stance on universal suffrage then became similar to that of the DAB, namely, that universal suffrage should be implemented in or after 2012 rather than in 2007/2008. The party won 14 elected seats in the District Council elections in November 2003.

The Liberal Party saw its greatest success in the 2004 Legislative Council election. With its success in gaining two seats from the geographical constituencies through direct elections, which chairman James Tien in New Territories East and Vice-chairwoman Selina Chow in New Territories West, while retaining those seats in the functional constituencies, the party increased its seats from 8 to 10, overtaking the Democratic Party for the first time since 1995 to become the second-largest political party in the legislature.

When Donald Tsang took over in November 2005, the party continued its generally pro-government stance and its warm relationship with Tsang administration. However the support for the chief executive could not be taken for granted. On 13 January 2006, the Liberal Party opposed Donald Tsang's plan to implement a five-day working week for most civil servants, due to concerns that this would put too much pressure on small to medium-sized enterprises to follow suit. The change went ahead and was widely adopted in the private sector. There is no planned legislation to force private employers to commit to a five-day working week. The Liberal Party supported Donald Tsang in his 2007 chief executive re-election. In exchange, Tsang quickly appointed James Tien as the head of the Hong Kong Tourism Board after he was elected.

=== 2008 split (2008–2012) ===
The fate of the party hung in the balance after its poor showing in the 2008 Legislative Council election. The party won seven seats, all in the functional constituencies, eliminating its limited public mandate; James Tien and Selina Chow both lost their geographical constituency seats, and both resigned their party functions. There were recriminations when Chow blamed the loss of her seat on Heung Yee Kuk chairman and Liberal Party member Lau Wong-fat for canvassing for the DAB during the elections. Former chairman Allen Lee said that the party was now "doomed" following their poll defeat because of a succession crisis and lack of funding. Miriam Lau succeeded Tien as the chairwoman of the party, while Tommy Cheung and Vincent Fang became vice-chairmen.

On 9 October 2008, three Legislative Councillors, Jeffrey Lam, Sophie Leung, and Andrew Leung, resigned from the party, citing internal party disagreements. Lam had been angling for the party leadership since Tien's resignation and his candidacy was endorsed by all six Legislative Councillors until Miriam Lau stepped in the leadership election. These resignations, along with the resignation of Lau Wong-fat, reduced the Liberal Party from seven Legislative Councillors to three. The resigned four later formed Economic Synergy, which merged into the Business and Professionals Alliance for Hong Kong today.

The debate over the minimum wage legislation in 2010 further caused intra-party conflicts. Chairperson of the Liberal Party's New Territories East Branch Christine Fong left the party after disagreements on the minimum wage legislation and after she was criticized by James Tien. Vice-chairman Tommy Cheung who represented the catering employers' interests in the Catering functional constituency was under fire when he suggested that the first statutory minimum rate should just be HK$20 (US$2.5). To project its "conscionable employer" image, the party suggested that the statutory minimum wage should be HK$24 an hour and made a clean break with Cheung. On other hand, James Tien's brother, Michael Tien, split from the party after his position of backing a campaign to boycott Cafe de Coral over its plans to offer workers a pay rise if they gave up their right to a paid lunch break shocked the party ranks and was fiercely attacked by Tommy Cheung. As a result, Michael Tien split from the party in November and subsequently joined Regina Ip's newly formed New People's Party and Tommy Cheung also resigned as party's vice-chairman. After Cheung's resignation, James Tien and Selina Chow officially returned to the party leadership when Tien was appointed the honorary chairman in December 2010 and Chow succeeded Cheung as the vice-chairwoman for the second time in January 2011.

In the 2012 Chief Executive election, the Liberal Party was the high-profile supporter of Henry Tang, its former party member. After Henry Tang suffered from the illegal basement scandal, the party unanimously decided its Election Committee members could either vote for Henry Tang or cast blank votes, but not to vote for Leung Chun-ying. The party remained critical of Leung administration. In August 2013, James Tien described Leung as "the worst chief executive so far" on a talk show. In October 2013, the Liberal Party even joined the pan-democrats in signing a petition to urge the Leung administration to re-consider its decision to not give a free-to-air TV license to Hong Kong Television Network.

=== Liberals under Leung government (2012–2017) ===
The party rebounded its seats in the legislative council from 3 to 5 in the 2012 Hong Kong Legislative Council election with James Tien regaining his direct elected seat in the New Territories East geographical constituency. However, Miriam Lau, who lost in her attempt in Hong Kong Island direct election, resigned as chairwoman. Following a three-month period with Vincent Fang as acting chairman, on 15 December 2012, Selina Chow was elected chairperson, unopposed. James Tien and Miriam Lau continued to serve as Honorary Chairpersons, while Fang and Felix Chung became vice-chairmen. It was also stated that a new party leader post would be created, along with three vice-chairmen to groom successors. A new post "party leader" was created in May 2013. James Tien was elected as the first party leader.

During the 2014 Hong Kong protests, James Tien called on Chief Executive CY Leung to resign, leading to the hearing of a call to eject him as a member of the Chinese People's Political Consultative Conference (CPPCC). Tien was formally stripped of his post at the meeting on 29 October, making him the first person in history to have received this sanction. Tien stepped down from his position as the leader of the Liberal Party after the removal. Tien and Selina Chow joined Miriam Lau to become the honorary chairmen in the following leadership election on 1 December while Vincent Fang and Felix Chung became the new Leader and chairman respectively and Eastern District Councillor Peter Shiu became the party's vice-chairman. Although not holding any executive position in the party, Tien has remained the spokesman and de facto leader of the Liberal Party.

In the 2016 Legislative Council election, party honorary chairman James Tien stood as a second candidate behind his young party member Dominic Lee. Both of them failed to retain the Liberals' only seat in the geographical constituencies. Although failing in ousting BPA's Jeffrey Lam in Commercial (First), the Liberals retained other four trade-based functional constituencies with vice-chairman Peter Shiu succeeded the retiring party leader Vincent Fang's Wholesale and Retail seat. The party's New Territories West candidate Ken Chow Wing-kan announced he would withdraw from the race before the election due to an "external force" threatened him and his family.

The Liberal Party elected Felix Chung and Tommy Cheung as the new leader and chairman after the election in October, with CPPCC member Alan Hoo and Eastern District Councillor Lee Chun-keung elected as vice-chairmen along with Peter Shiu. The new leadership was seen as more moderate with less vocal anti-Leung Chun-ying stance. Cheung was subsequently appointed by Leung to the executive council. Although claiming he has gotten the endorsement from the party, Cheung's move was criticised by Tien.

=== Liberals in Lam government (2017–2022) ===
In the 2017 Chief Executive election, the Liberals were split between former Chief Secretary Carrie Lam and former Financial Secretary John Tsang. The party honorary chairman James Tien was first of the few pro-Beijing electors to publicly endorse Tsang. Honorary chairwoman Selina Chow and leader Felix Chung also endorsed Tsang, making the Liberal Party the only pro-Beijing party to nominate Tsang, although some Liberal electors such as chairman Tommy Cheung nominated Lam.

The Carrie Lam administration reached out to the Liberals when she appointed two Liberal members, Joseph Chan and Mark Fu into the government as Political Assistants. The Liberal Party lost its own seat in the National People's Congress after incumbent Miriam Lau retired from the national legislature and its candidate Nicholas Chan Hiu-fung failed to gain a seat in the 2017 election. As supplementary member, Chan became the delegate after Peter Wong Man-kong died in March 2019.

The Liberal leadership was deeply divided over the extradition bill controversy in 2019. After the 9 June protest which drew over a million people marching in the streets as the organisers claimed, the Carrie Lam administration issued a statement it was determined to resume the debate on the bill in the legislative council. The Liberal Party quickly followed and issued its own statement in support of the government. However, former party chairman and leader James Tien had been outspoken for his opposition to the bill. On 8 July when the government finally backed down as Carrie Lam declared the bill was dead, James Tien and three other honorary chairmen of the party, Selina Chow, Miriam Lau and Vincent Fang called on Tommy Cheung who was an executive councillor at Lam's cabinet to resign as he failed to relay public opposition to the bill, but was refused by Cheung. James Tien publicly called for the resignation of Carrie Lam as chief executive.

In 2020, members of the moderate Tien faction, former DAB Chairman Tsang Yok-sing and former Financial Secretary John Tsang announced the founding of the Hope for Hong Kong organisation after accusing the Liberal Party's leadership of growing too close to Beijing which aimed to explore a middle ground between the pro-Beijing and pro-democracy camps as a centrist organisation.

=== National security law (2022–present) ===
In the 2021 legislative election, Felix Chung, member of the Tien faction, was defeated in his constituency of Textiles and Garment after the revamp of the electoral system, while the party retained a total of 4 seats in the parliament. On 10 May 2022, the party elected Tommy Cheung as the new leader as the position is, per custom, occupied by a LegCo member. The Liberal Party leadership also supported John Lee during his campaign as the Chief Executive and after his election victory. Cheung stayed as a member of the Executive Council.

On 10 August 2022, three honorary chairpersons, James Tien, Miriam Lau, and Selina Chow, who supported non-establishment candidate in the last year's election, decided to resign and quit the party to protest after the Central Committee discussed removing the titles without consulting them. Tien said the leadership did not follow the party's traditions, while Chow expressed disappointment as the decision was not sound. Angered by the "disrespect" from the leadership, Chow attacked Shiu, the chairman, for "dictating" party reform. The Central Committee agreed the abolition unanimously later that day, and thanked their contributions in a statement. The shake-up of the party leadership marked the end of the Tien era, whose moderate faction started to lose power after Carrie Lam became leader and the defeat of Chung.

The 2025 legislative election saw Cheung and other veterans opting out of the parliament. On 15 November 2026, the Liberal Party axed the position of party leader, reportedly after considering the size of the party and the calmer political atmosphere, allowing Cheung to withdrawing from the senior role. The change in the party constitution established two more vice-chairperson posts as well, bringing the total to eight.

== Election performance ==
=== Legislative Council elections ===
Election	Number of popular votes	% of popular votes	GC seats	FC seats	EC seats	Total seats	+/−	Position
1995	15,216	1.67	1	9	0	10 / 60	5▼	2nd
1998	50,335▲	3.40▲	0	9	1	10 / 60	Steady	3rd
2000	24,858▼	1.88▼	0	8	0	8 / 60	2▼	3rd
2004	118,997▲	6.67▲	2	8		10 / 60	2▲	2nd▲
2008	65,622▼	4.33▼	0	7		7 / 60	3▼	3rd▼
2012	48,702▼	2.64▼	1	4		5 / 70	2▼	5th▲
2016	21,500▼	0.99▼	0	4		4 / 70	1▼	6th▼
2021	–	–	0	3	1	4 / 90	Steady	5th▲
2025	32,371	2.54	0	3	1	4 / 90	Steady	4th▲

=== Municipal elections ===
Election	Number of popular votes	% of popular votes	UrbCo seats	RegCo seats	Total elected seats
1995	7,188	1.29	1 / 32	0 / 27	1 / 59

=== District Council elections ===
Election	Number of popular votes	% of popular votes	D.E. seats	E.C. seats	App. seats	Ex off. seats	Total elected seats	+/−
1994	50,755	7.39	18			1	18 / 346	6▲
1999	27,718▼	3.42▼	15		9	2	15 / 390	3▼
2003	29,108▲	2.77▼	12		8	2	14 / 400	1▲
2007	50,026▲	4.39▲	14		13	2	14 / 405	3▼
2011	23,408▼	1.98▼	9		4	0	9 / 412	3▲
2015	25,157▲	1.74▼	9			1	9 / 431	1▼
2019	27,684▲	0.94▼	5			0	5 / 452	3▼
2023	19,574▼	1.67▲	3	2	3	0	8 / 470	3▲

== Leadership ==
=== Chairpersons ===
No.	Leader (Birth–Death)	Portrait	Constituency	Took office	Left office	Duration
1	Allen Lee (1940-2020)		Appointed (1993–95); New Territories North-east (1995–97)	26 June 1993	5 December 1998	5 years and 163 days
2	James Tien (born 1947)		Commercial (First) (1998–2004); New Territories East (2004–08)	5 December 1998	8 September 2008 (Note: Resigned, Miriam Lau served as acting chair between 8 September and 24 October 2008.)	9 years and 279 days
3	Miriam Lau (born 1947)		Transport	8 September 2008	9 September 2012	4 years and 2 days
–	Vincent Fang (born 1943); Acting		Wholesale and Retail	9 September 2012	15 December 2012	98 days
4	Selina Chow (born 1945)		None	15 December 2012	1 December 2014	1 year and 352 days
5	Felix Chung (born 1963)		Textiles and Garment	1 December 2014	7 October 2016	1 year and 312 days
6	Tommy Cheung (born 1949)		Catering	7 October 2016	10 May 2022	5 years and 216 days
7	Peter Shiu (born 1970)		Wholesale and Retail	10 May 2022	Incumbent	4 years and 195 days

=== Honorary chairpersons ===
- James Tien, 2010–2012, 2014–2022 (resigned)
- Miriam Lau, 2012–2022 (resigned)
- Selina Chow, 2014–2022 (resigned)
- Vincent Fang, 2016–2022

The title of honorary chairperson was abolished on 10 August 2022.

=== Vice-chairpersons ===
- Ronald Arculli, 1993–2000
- Steven Poon, 1996–1998
- Selina Chow, 1998–2008, 2011–2012
- Miriam Lau, 2000–2008
- Tommy Cheung, 2008–2010
- Vincent Fang, 2008–2014
- Felix Chung, 2012–2014
- Peter Shiu, 2014–2022
- Alan Hoo, 2016–present
- Lee Chun-keung, 2016–present
- Nicholas Chan, 2022–present

=== Leaders ===
No.	Leader (Birth–Death)	Portrait	Constituency	Took office	Left office	Duration
1	James Tien (born 1947)		New Territories East	21 May 2013	29 October 2014	1 year and 162 days
2	Vincent Fang (born 1943)		Wholesale and Retail	1 December 2014	7 October 2016	1 year and 312 days
3	Felix Chung (born 1963)		Textiles and Garment (until 2021)	7 October 2016	10 May 2022	5 years and 216 days
4	Tommy Cheung (born 1949)		Catering	10 May 2022	15 November 2026	4 years and 189 days

== Representatives ==
=== Executive Council ===
- Tommy Cheung

=== Legislative Council ===
Constituency	Member
Legal	Chan Hiu Fung Nicholas
Wholesale and Retail	Shiu Ka-fai
Catering	Leung Chun
Election Committee	Lee Chun-keung

=== District Councils ===
The Liberal Party has won eight seats in five district councils (2024–2027):

District	Constituency	Member
Central & Western	Central	Karl Fung Kar-leung
Central & Western	Appointed	Jeremy Young Chit-on
Wan Chai	District Committees	Wind Lam Wai-man
Wan Chai	Appointed	Chow Kam-wai
Eastern	Tai Pak	Kenny Yuen Kin-chung
Eastern	District Committees	Tsang Cheuk-yi
Southern	Southern District Southeast	Leung Chun
Sai Kung	Appointed	Lam Chun-ka

== See also ==
- United Front Work Department
- United Front (China)
- Co-operative Resources Centre
- Conservatism in Hong Kong
- Economic Synergy
