= Hong Kong Tourism Board =

Hong Kong government departments and agencie

- 香港旅遊發展局

Agency overview
- Headquarters: 9-11/F, Citicorp Centre, 18 Whitfield Road, Causeway Bay, Hong Kong, People's Republic of China
- Employees: 325
- Annual budget: HK$613.6m (2008–09)
- Agency executives: Pang Yiu-kai, Chairman; Dane Cheng , Executive Director; Becky Ip , Deputy Executive Director
- Website: DiscoverHongKong.com

Hong Kong Tourism Board
- Traditional Chinese: 香港旅遊發展局
- Jyutping: Hoeng1 gong2 leoi5 jau4 faat3 zin2 guk6
- Literal meaning: Hong Kong Tourism Development Board
Transcriptions
Standard Mandarin
- Hanyu Pinyin: Xiānggǎng Lǚyóu Fāzhǎnjú
- Wade–Giles: Hsiang-kang Lüyu Fachanchü
- Tongyong Pinyin: Siānggǎng Lyǔyóu Fājhǎnjyú
- Yale Romanization: Syānggǎng Lyǔyóu Fājǎnjyú
Yue: Cantonese
- Yale Romanization: Heūng góng leuíh yaùh faat jín guhk
- Jyutping: Hoeng1 gong2 leoi5 jau4 faat3 zin2 guk6

Hong Kong Tourist Association
- Traditional Chinese: 香港旅遊協會
- Jyutping: Hoeng1 gong2 leoi5 jau4 hip3 wui6
Transcriptions
Yue: Cantonese
- Yale Romanization: Heūng góng leuíh yaùh hip wuih
- Jyutping: Hoeng1 gong2 leoi5 jau4 hip3 wui6

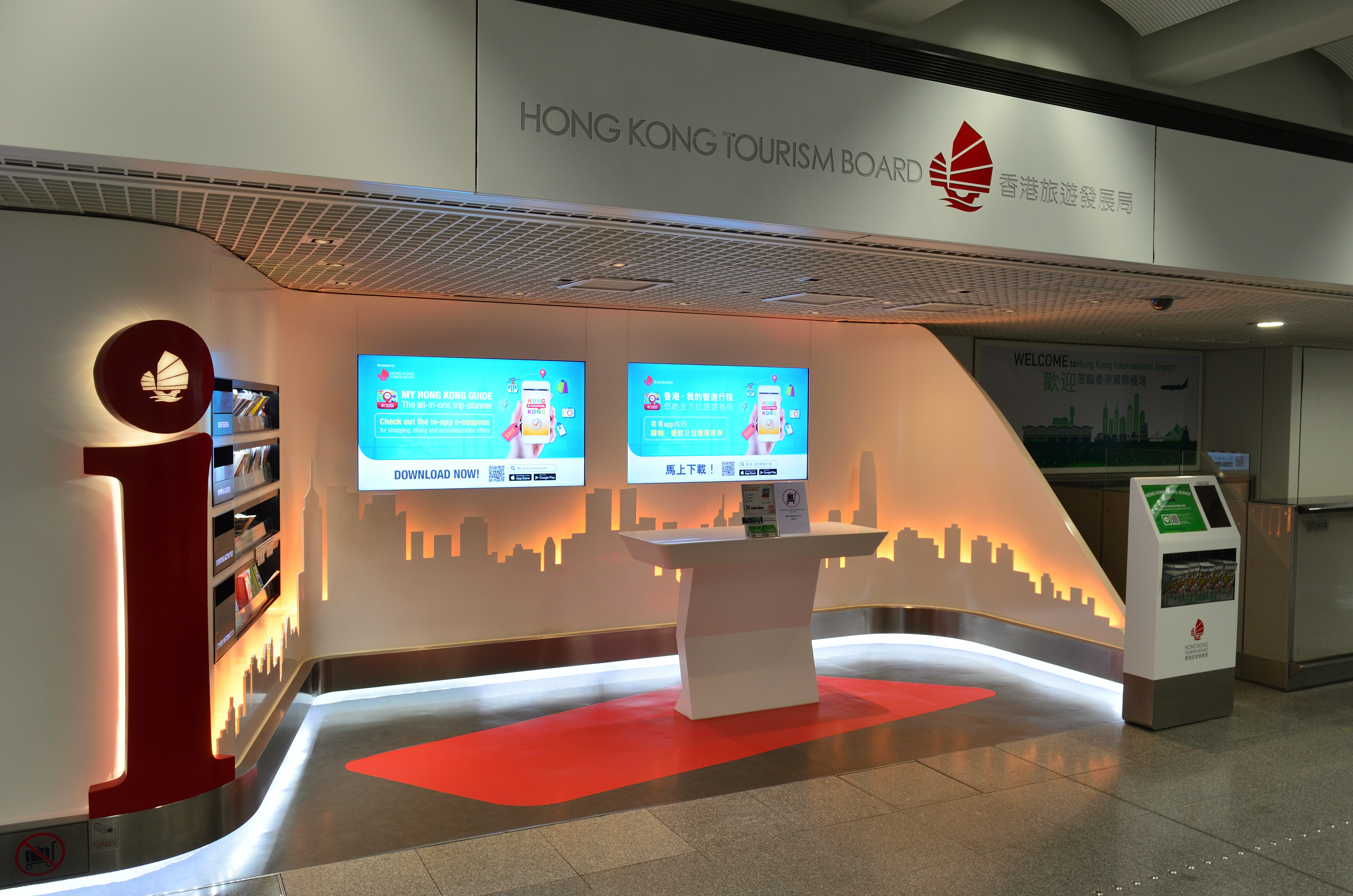
Hong Kong Tourism Board at the Hong Kong International Airport

The Hong Kong Tourism Board (HKTB) is a government-subverted body founded in 2001. The HKTB replaced the Hong Kong Tourist Association (HKTA) that was established in 1957. It has 15 branch offices and representative offices in 6 markets around the world, and its primary mission is to maximize the social and economic contribution that tourism makes to the community of Hong Kong and consolidate the city's position as a desired destination. The HKTA works with the Government, travel industry and other partners to market and promote Hong Kong worldwide, improving the range and quality of visitor facilities, tourism service standards and enhancing the experiences of visitors.

== Visitor centres ==
- Hong Kong International Airport – Transfer Area and Buffer Halls A and B, Arrivals Level, Terminal 1
- Lo Wu – Arrival Hall, 2/F, Lo Wu Terminal Building, Lo Wu Control Point
- Hong Kong Island – The Peak Piazza
- Kowloon – Star Ferry Concourse, Tsim Sha Tsui

== HKTB Board ==
The HKTB Board is operated by the Chief Executive of the Hong Kong SAR Government and is made up of 20 members from various industries. The Commissioner for Tourism, who is a government official, holds the capacity as Deputy Chairman of the HKTB.

== Quality Tourism Services (QTS) scheme ==
Launched in November 1999, the Quality Tourism Services (QTS) Scheme (優質旅遊服務) is an accreditation programme which promotes service excellence among local businesses and assists customers with identifying quality service providers. To qualify, a merchant must fulfil a prescribed criteria and undergo annual assessments. Initially, only shops and restaurants were covered by the QTS scheme. The scheme was extended to accommodations and hair salons in November 2006 and March 2010 respectively.

As of March 2010, over 7,200 merchant outlets have been accredited under the QTS scheme. The QTS scheme is one of the most successful consumer protection programmes in Hong Kong. The Intellectual Property Department reported in 2008 that 4,700 outlets had joined its "No Fakes Pledge" – another well-known consumer protection programme in the territory.

All accredited merchants must display the gold and black QTS sign on their shop windows for recognition. After the launch of the QTS scheme, the use of membership badges bearing the iconic red junk logos of the former HKTA was discontinued in 2000. The HKTA membership badge was first introduced in 1965.

=== TV commercial ===
Starring famous Hong Kong actor/singer/producer Andy Lau, the 2003 commercial was inspired by Lau's 2002 blockbuster movie Infernal Affairs – a movie about an undercover cop and a bad cop working for the triads. The core message of the commercial is shops selling genuine goods and providing high standard service should set themselves apart from dishonest merchants by getting the QTS accreditation. The commercial is currently still aired from time to time.

The QTS commercial is often confused with another public service announcement (PSA) promoting quality services which was also fronted by Andy Lau. The PSA was filmed in 2002 by the Information Services Department. There were 5 different versions all featuring rude vs. courteous shop assistants and drivers. Titled "Success Starts with Quality Service" (優質服務 致勝之道), the PSA was a huge success as one of Lau's lines, "Service like this just isn't good enough in today's standard" (今時今日咁嘅服務態度未夠架) has become a popular Hong Kong slang term used to describe poor service or a bad-tempered person.

=== VIP offers ===
Simply by presenting his/her travel document and a copy of QTS promotional leaflet at a participating QTS merchant, visitors can enjoy special privileges ranging from exclusive discount to small gift (e.g. a free silk tee for purchasing a suit at a custom tailor). In addition to displaying the QTS gold and black sign, participating QTS merchants would also display the red VIP Offers sign as recognition. The VIP Offers programme was discontinued on 31 December 2008.

=== Incidents ===
==== 3D-GOLD Jewellery (SEHK: 870) ====
Investigations were launched against one of the 3D-GOLD outlets after 40 customers complained that they had been harassed by the staff and had been prevented from leaving the shop. The entire 3D-GOLD chain store was stripped of its QTS status with effect from 1 December 2004. This was the first termination in the scheme's history.

The original 3D-GOLD Jewellery Holdings got into more controversies with the sudden death of its chairman, delisting from the stock exchange and it was on the verge of liquidation by the end of 2008. In July 2009, the jeweller was officially taken over by Hong Kong Resources Holdings (SEHK: 2882).

The QTS status of the new 3D-GOLD chain was later reinstated after it had passed the assessment.

==== Director of Audit's report ====
The Audit Commission carried out a comprehensive audit on the HKTB in 2006 – 07. In the report released in October 2007, an entire section was devoted to the QTS scheme. The commission made 3 recommendations suggesting HKTB should take action to improve the scheme and reduce the number of complaints, explore ways to achieve self-financing and encourage more operators to apply for the QTS Visitor Accommodation Scheme. In response, HKTB committed to creating more places in the quality training workshops for merchants and co-operate with the Home Affairs Department to proactively promote QTS Visitor Accommodation Scheme.

==== Bird's nest vendors ====
The QTS status of 3 merchants specialised in the bird's nest – a Chinese delicacy – were terminated on the 27 July 2007. The 3 merchants had publicly admitted infringement of another merchant's trademark.

==== Outsourcing ====
In a bid to save HK $2 million annually (US$256,000) in operating costs, HKTB announced on 5 November 2010 that the assessment work of QTS merchants had been outsourced to the Productivity Council, while the work to engage merchants to offer discounts for visitors had been outsourced to AQ Communications. The saving will fund extra marketing work for the QTS scheme. As a result, the jobs of 17 permanent and contract staff of the Partnership & Quality Tourism Services Department had been made redundant with immediate effect. Only 5 staff would be retained to monitor the outsourced work.

Local media reported that the staff affected were first notified at 3pm on the same day of the announcement and were asked to leave by the end of the day. They were given compensation in accordance with the local labour laws but were denied internal transfer to other vacant positions within the organisation. A staff had expressed anger at being kept in the dark about the tendering of the outsourced work in a newspaper interview.

HKTB Deputy Executive Director Daisy Lam later reiterated to the media at an event launch function that the outsourcing was a result of an organizational review conducted a year ago in 2009.

In an interview to local newspapers, Legislator Lee Cheuk-yan questioned about the quality of work after the outsourcing. Lee was also concerned that the affected staff will be unable to secure another job as the end of the year. Another lawmaker Wong Kwok-h

Hing criticized HKTB for setting a bad example and he feared the private sector may follow suit.

Daisy Lam responded to critics that in addition to compensation, those affected may consider a transfer to the two outsourced bodies. Lam was not worried others would follow HKTB's move as other companies should make their own judgment call.

== Events ==
- June 2013 - "Hong Kong Live at The Grove" brought excitement and splendours of Asia's World City to Los Angeles' premier retail and entertainment destination with an unforgettable three days of dynamic cultural immersion highlighting gourmet Cantonese cuisine, talented performers and sophisticated jazz fusion music. Guests were also visually immersed in an exciting and exclusive art installation from celebrated Hong Kong architect William Lim and designer Kevin Lim of OPENUU, melding Eastern tradition with Western contemporary style for a dynamic and stunning visual display aptly titled "Hong Kong, The Big Catch."
- November 2022 - Guests to the Global Financial Leaders' Investment Summit will be given free coupons as gifts to the Wine and Dine Festival, from the HKTB, where they can be redeemed at 210 restaurants and bars for free cocktails or other drinks. The tickets are reserved and separate from the 50,000 allocated to the public.
- In 2023, Hong Kong launches "Hello Hong Kong" campaign, offering 500,000 free airfares to boost tourism.
