= Functional constituency (Hong Kong) =

Type of constituency at the Hong Kong legislative assembly

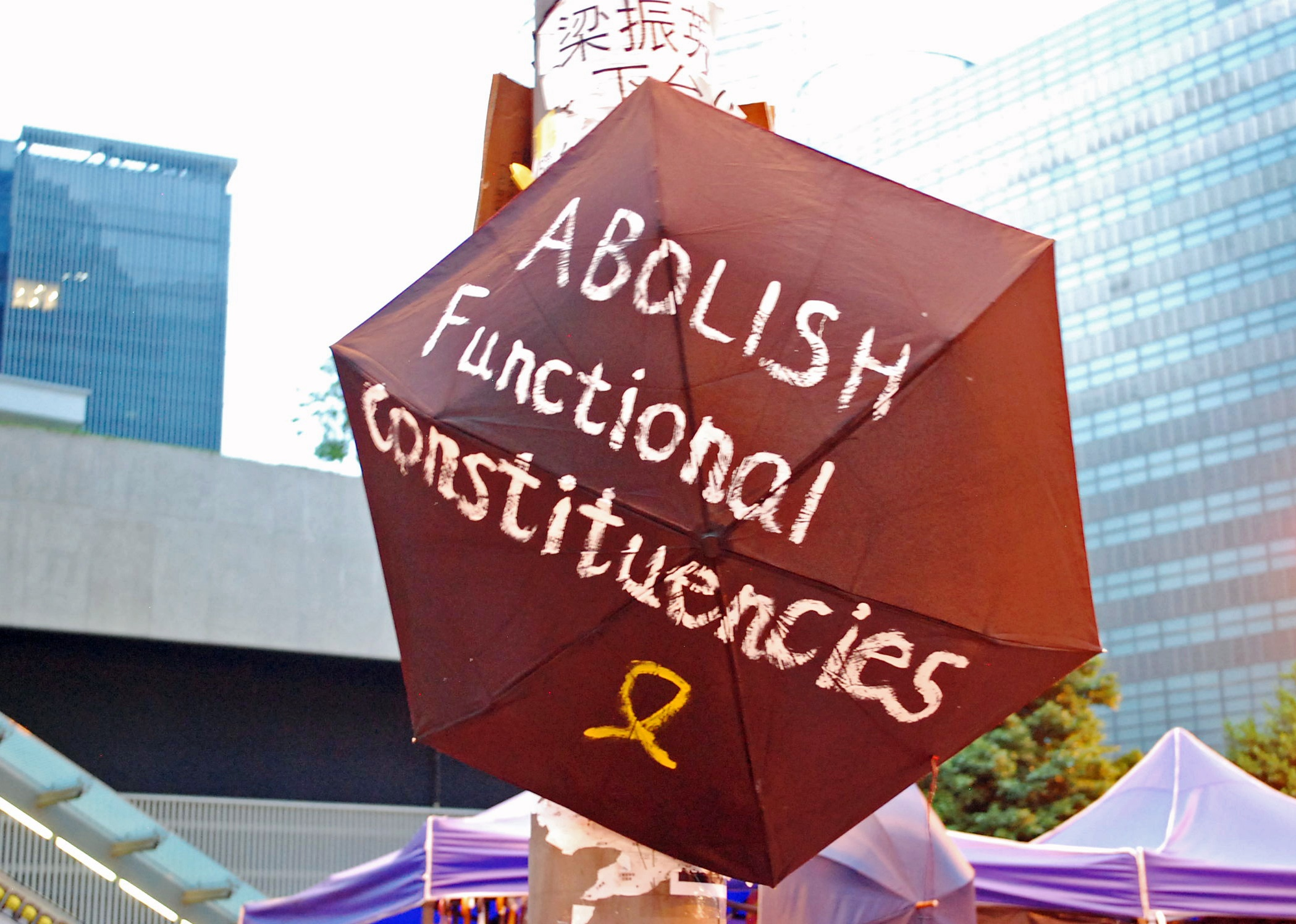
The 2014 Hong Kong protests sought, among other goals, to abolish functional constituencies

In the Legislative Council of Hong Kong, a functional constituency (FC; Chinese: 功能界別 and formerly 功能組別 before handover of Hong Kong) is a seat representing professional or special interest groups. Eligible voters in a functional constituency may include natural persons as well as other designated legal entities such as organisations and corporations. The functional constituency has long been criticised to be undemocratic and not representative, with persistent calls from the pro-democracy camp to abolish all of them for a genuine universal suffrage to elect the legislature.

== History ==
The concept of functional constituencies (FC) in Hong Kong was first developed in the release of "Green Paper: A Pattern of District Administration in Hong Kong" on 18 July 1984 when indirect elections were introduced to the Legislative Council for the first time. The paper suggested that the Legislative Council create 24 seats with 12 seats from different professional interest groups elected through 11 functional constituencies (one of them, the Labour constituency, was allocated two seats). The eleven constituencies include those elected by HKGCC (for First Commercial), CGCC (for Second Commercial), FHKI (for First Industrial), CMAHK (for Second Industrial), HKAB (for Financial), HKCSS (for Social Services), and HKMA (for Medical).

In 1988, the Financial constituency was enlarged into Financial and Accountancy constituencies and the Medical constituency was enlarged into Medical and Health Care constituencies respectively. In 1991, the functional constituencies were more developed. With 9 directly elected geographical constituencies created, 20 functional constituencies consisting of 11 types of industry in which 7 new functional constituencies including Rural (elected by Heung Yee Kuk and later renamed as so), Urban Council and Regional Council were also set up.

In 1992, Chris Patten suggested additional political reform that adds nine additional functional constituencies (Chinese: 新九組) with a much expanded voter base to the existing system. The changes were implemented in the 1995 legislative election.

After transfer of sovereignty over Hong Kong in 1997, there were in total 28 functional constituencies. Corporate voting was restored after it was abolished in 1995. It reduced the number of eligible voters by almost 90 percent, from over 1.1 million in 1995 to fewer than 140,000 in 1998. The Labour constituency returns three seats, up from two, and the others return one each.

By 2000, the seat held by Urban Council and Regional Council were dissolved by Chief Executive Tung Chee Hwa, the two seats were replaced by Catering and District Council. The District Council would be renamed to District Council (First) by 2012, as a result of the addition of a special Functional Constituency having candidates from District Council but with a different range of electors, named District Council (Second).

In 2021, the National People's Congress initiated a decision to change the electoral rule in Hong Kong. As a result of this decision, the five District Council (Second) seats and the District Council (First) constituency were abolished; Information Technology was replaced by Technology and Innovation; and Health Services was merged with Medical to form the Medical and Health Service. Commercial (Third) and HKSAR deputies to the National People's Congress, HKSAR members of the National Committee of the Chinese People's Political Consultative Conference, and representatives of relevant national organisations, both heavily pro-China, were created.

== Electorates ==
The electoral base is non-uniform, and there may be institutional votes or individual votes. Chris Patten had once called some of the functional constituencies as "rotten boroughs". The Standing Committee of the National People's Congress (NPCSC) refers to the participation of the business block vote in the affairs of Hong Kong as "balanced participation", deciding in 2004 that "Any change...shall conform to principles such as being compatible with the social, economic, political development of Hong Kong, being conducive to the balanced participation of all sectors and groups."

In 2021, the Government published details of the electoral base of the functional constituencies as follows:

Registered voters in the functional constituencies of Hong Kong in 2021
Functional constituency		Number of registered electors		
Functional constituency		Bodies	Individuals	Total
1	Heung Yee Kuk		161	161
2	Agriculture and Fisheries	176		176
3	Insurance	126		126
4	Transport	223		223
5	Education		85,117	85,117
6	Legal		7,549	7,549
7	Accountancy		27,778	27,778
8	Medical and Health Services		55,523	55,523
9	Engineering		10,772	10,772
10	Architectural, Surveying and Planning		9,123	9,123
11	Labour	697		697
12	Social Welfare		13,974	13,974
13	Real Estate and Construction	463		463
14	Tourism	192		192
15	Commercial (First)	1,041		1,041
16	Commercial (Second)	421		421
17	Commercial (Third)	288		288
18	Industrial (First)	421		421
19	Industrial (Second)	592		592
20	Finance	114		114
21	Financial Services	760		760
22	Sports, Performing Arts, Culture and Publication	257		257
23	Import and Export	231		231
24	Textiles and Garment	348		348
25	Wholesale and Retail	2,015		2,015
26	Technology and Innovation	73		73
27	Catering	141		141
28	HKSAR members of NPC and CPPCC, representatives of national organisations		678	678
Total		8,579	210,675	219,254

Under the 2021 Hong Kong electoral changes, 28 functional constituencies return 30 members. The Labour Functional Constituency returns three members by plurality block voting. The other FCs return one member each with first-past-the-post voting. A number of seats with restricted suffrage were uncontested until 2021 as reportedly ordered by the Chinese authorities.

== Evolution ==
The following table charts the evolution of functional constituencies of the LegCo:

Evolution of functional constituencies
1985	1988	1991	1995	1998 (Note: Between 1 July 1997 and the first Legislative Council elected in 1998, the Provisional Legislative Council is the legislature in Hong Kong where functional constituencies were not represented.)	2000	2004	2008	2012	2016	2021
Urban Council (Electoral College)		Urban Council			District Council (until 2012) → District Council (First) (after 2012)					HKSAR members of NPC and CPPCC, rep. of national organisations
Regional Council (Electoral College)		Regional Council			District Council (until 2012) → District Council (First) (after 2012)					HKSAR members of NPC and CPPCC, rep. of national organisations
Commercial (First)
Commercial (Second)
Industrial (First)
Industrial (Second)
Finance
Labour (return two members (until 1997) → return three members (after 1998))
Social Services (until 1995) → Social Welfare (after 1995)
Teaching (until 1995) → Education (after 1995)
Legal
Engineering, Architectural, Surveying and Planning		Architectural, Surveying and Planning							Architectural, Surveying, Planning & Landscape	
Engineering, Architectural, Surveying and Planning		Engineering								
Medical										Medical and Health Services (Note: Electorate base expanded to include the Chinese Medicine sector)
—N/a	Health Care (until 1995) → Health Services (after 1995)									Medical and Health Services
—N/a	Accountancy									
—N/a		Real Estate and Construction								
—N/a		Tourism								
—N/a		Financial Services								
—N/a		Rural (until 1997) → Heung Yee Kuk (after 1998)								
—N/a			Agriculture, Fisheries, Mining, Energy and Construction	Agriculture and Fisheries						
—N/a			Textiles and Garment							
—N/a			Manufacturing	—N/a						
—N/a			Import and Export							
—N/a			Wholesale and Retail							
—N/a			Hotels and Catering	—N/a	Catering					
—N/a			Transport and Communication	Transport						
—N/a			Financing, Insurance, Real Estate and Business Services	Insurance						
—N/a			Community, Social and Personal Services	—N/a						
—N/a				Sports, Performing Arts, Culture and Publication						
—N/a				Information Technology						Technology and Innovation

== Criticism ==
Pro-democracy supporters criticise the functional constituency system for giving a minority too much power and influence. The right of corporations and legal entities to vote is also controversial, as it gives some individuals multiple votes. For example, in 1998, Sino Group chairman Robert Ng and companies he controlled held roughly 3-4% of the votes in the real estate constituency, according to an analysis by the Hong Kong Human Rights Monitor; they described this as being equivalent in voting power to 15,940 people in a geographical constituency.

In most functional constituencies, the entire body of eligible voters comprises legal entities that are not natural persons. This is known as corporate voting.

In 2009, there were applications for judicial review to challenge the legality of corporate voting on the grounds that it contravened the right to vote enshrined in Article 26 of the Basic Law or was discriminatory in nature. Mr. Justice Andrew Cheung (as the Chief Justice then was) dismissed the applications, emphasising that his judgment was solely concerned with the constitutionality of corporate voting rather than the political wisdom of corporate voting or functional constituencies.

There have been calls to abolish the functional constituencies from pan democrats. The May 2010 by-election was triggered by the resignation of 5 pan-democrats from the Legislative Council who put themselves up for re-election to the Legislative Council. The 'Five Constituencies Referendum' concept to use a by-election as a de facto referendum on universal suffrage and the abolition of functional constituencies was hatched by the League of Social Democrats.

=== Reform proposals ===
Following the consultations on the 2009 political reform package, where an additional five legislative seats for District Councils were proposed (in addition to Geographical seats) the government unveiled the revised package in mid-April 2010. It was proposed that the five additional Legco seats for the district council constituencies will be elected by proportional representation instead of block voting. With the proposals looking likely to be vetoed, the Democratic Party said they would support the measures if the five new District Council functional seats, and the one existing seat, would return candidates nominated by district councillors and elected by all registered voters.

== See also ==
- Corporatism
- Indirectly elected member (Macau)
- List of constituencies of Hong Kong
- City of London Corporation
- Suffrage#Business vote
- Vocational panels in Ireland
