= 7th Legislative Council of Hong Kong =

2022–2025 legislative session

←	6th LegCo	8th LegCo	→
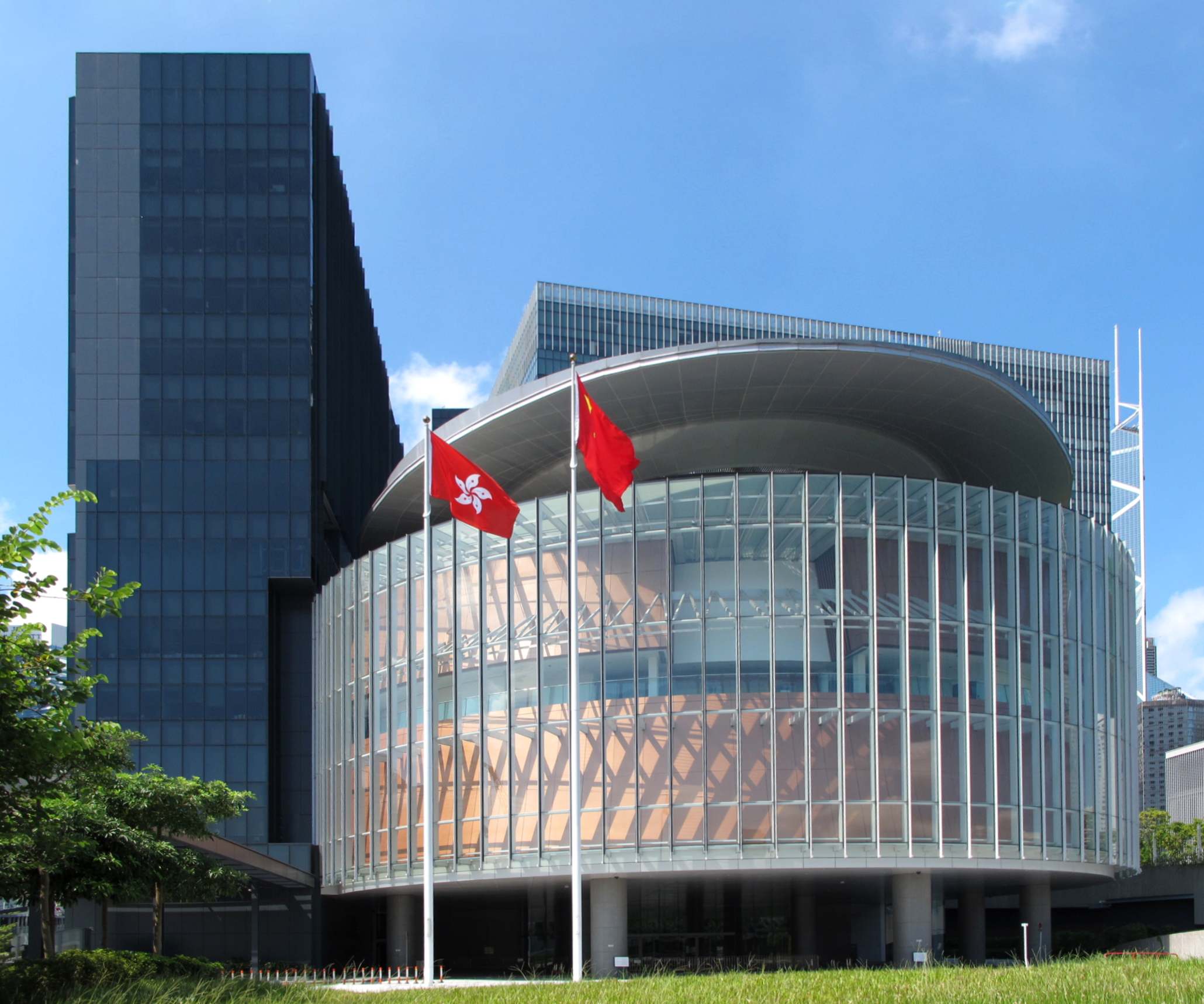

Overview
- Legislative body: Legislative Council
- Jurisdiction: Hong Kong
- Meeting place: Legislative Council Complex
- Term: 1 January 2022 – 31 December 2025
- Election: 2021 election
- Government: Lam Administration (until 30 June 2022); Lee Administration (Since 1 July 2022)
- Members: 90 members
- President: Andrew Leung (BPA)
- Party control: Pro-Beijing camp

Sessions
- 1st: 12 January 2022 – 23 December 2022
- 2nd: 11 January 2023 – 22 December 2023
- 3rd: 10 January 2024 – 27 December 2024
- 4th: 8 January 2025 – 24 October 2025

The Seventh Legislative Council of Hong Kong is the seventh meeting of the legislative branch of the Hong Kong Special Administrative Region government. Its term of office began on 1 January 2022 and convened on 12 January 2022, in the last six months of Carrie Lam's tenure as Chief Executive and the first three-and-a-half years of John Lee's term of office. The legislature's term of office ended on 31 December 2025.

The December 2021 election decided control of the legislature. Originally scheduled for 6 September 2020, Chief Executive Carrie Lam postponed the election for a whole year on 31 July 2020 because of COVID-19 pandemic. On 11 March 2021, the National People's Congress (NPC) passed a decision to drastically overhaul the Hong Kong electoral system, which was followed by the Carrie Lam administration promulgated the Improving Electoral System (Consolidated Amendments) Ordinance 2021, which changed the general election of the seventh term of the Legislative Council from 5 September to 19 December 2021. Under the Ordinance, the membership of the Legislative Council increased from 70 to 90, and the members were elected by the Election Committee with 40 seats, functional constituencies with 30 seats, and geographical constituencies with 20 seats respectively.

Under the new "patriots only" election rules, the pro-Beijing camp won its largest majority ever, taking 89 out of the 90 seats in the chamber. The pan-democratic and localist camps were left with no representation in the legislature for the first time since the Handover, with political parties disbanded, candidates disqualified from running, and most of their supporters boycotting the election. The 2021 election registered the lowest turnout ever since the introduction of elections to the Legislative Council in 1985, with only 32.22% of registered voters turning out to vote in the functional and geographical constituencies.

The legislators elected in 2021 have been criticised for not showing up to meetings and votes and for failing to submit work reports; in the 2024 legislative year, two-thirds of the 24 bills adopted were passed with under half of all councillors present, falling short of the 45-member quorum requirement. Despite an increase in the size of the council, the number of questions asked by lawmakers has plunged, almost halving from 6,722 in 2020 to 3519 in 2023, with the quality of questions reported as having "plummeted".

== Major events ==
- 1 January 2022: Commencement of this Council's term of office.
- 3 January 2022: Oath-taking ceremony. 3 of the members took oath in Mandarin, namely Chow Man-kong, Sun Dong and Tan Yueheng.
- 4 January 2022: Nomination for the president. Andrew Leung re-elected unopposed as the only candidate.
- 10 January 2022: Originally scheduled for election of the president but cancelled.
- 12 January 2022: Council's first session was convened.
- 19 June 2022: Resignation of Horace Cheung, Alice Mak, Sun Dong and Nelson Lam after appointed as officials of the new government headed by Chief Executive-elect John Lee.
- 18 December 2022: By-election for vacancies of Election Committee constituency. Chan Wing-kwong, Adrian Ho, Shang Hailong, William Wong elected.
- 27 December 2022: Resignation of Stephen Wong after appointed as head of Chief Executive's Policy Unit.
- 24 October 2025: Legislative Council prorogued

In May 2023, the Legislative Council voted with 100% approval to let the chief executive restrict overseas lawyers from national security cases, following attempts by the government to block Jimmy Lai from hiring Tim Owen as his defense lawyer.

The secretariat made changes where lawmakers' names were replaced with "a member" or "members" in meeting minutes, which the Hong Kong Journalists Association said "would make it more difficult for the public to hold lawmakers accountable, and therefore affect how voters may vote."

The Chinese national emblem was installed in the chamber above the Hong Kong emblem for the first time.

A survey in 2023 found that half of Hongkongers were unable to name any serving lawmaker, with another 12% naming somebody not a current lawmaker.

== Major legislation ==
=== Enacted ===
- 9 June 2022: Employment and Retirement Schemes Legislation (Offsetting Arrangement) (Amendment) Bill 2022 - for Mandatory Provident Fund
- 6 July 2023: District Councils (Amendment) Bill 2023
- 12 July 2023: Criminal Procedure (Amendment) Bill 2023
- 14 December 2023: Taxi-Driver-Offence Points Bill
- 19 March 2024: Safeguarding National Security Bill
- 26 June 2024: Extension of Government Leases Bill
- 3 July 2024: Social Workers Registration (Amendment) Bill 2024
- 11 July 2024: Mandatory Reporting of Child Abuse Bill
- 20 February 2025: Road Tunnels (Government) (Amendment) Bill 2024
- 26 March 2025: Courts (Remote Hearing) Bill
- 7 May 2025: Protection of the Harbour (Amendment) Bill 2024
- 21 May 2025: Stablecoins Bill
- 11 June 2025: Housing (Amendment) Bill 2025 - to combat tenancy abuse
- 25 June 2025: Trade Unions (Amendment) Bill 2025 - to tighten union laws on national security grounds
- 23 July 2025: Legislative Council (Powers and Privileges) (Amendment) Bill 2025 - following the introduction of code of conduct
- 11 September 2025: Betting Duty (Amendment) Bill 2025 - to authorise basketball betting
- 11 September 2025: Tobacco Control Legislation (Amendment) Bill 2025
- 26 September 2025: Basic Housing Units Bill - to regulate subdivided flats
- 15 October 2025: Road Traffic (Amendment) (Ride-hailing Service) Bill 2025 - to introduce licenses for ride-hailing service

=== Defeated ===
- 10 September 2025: Registration of Same-sex Partnerships Bill

== Leadership ==
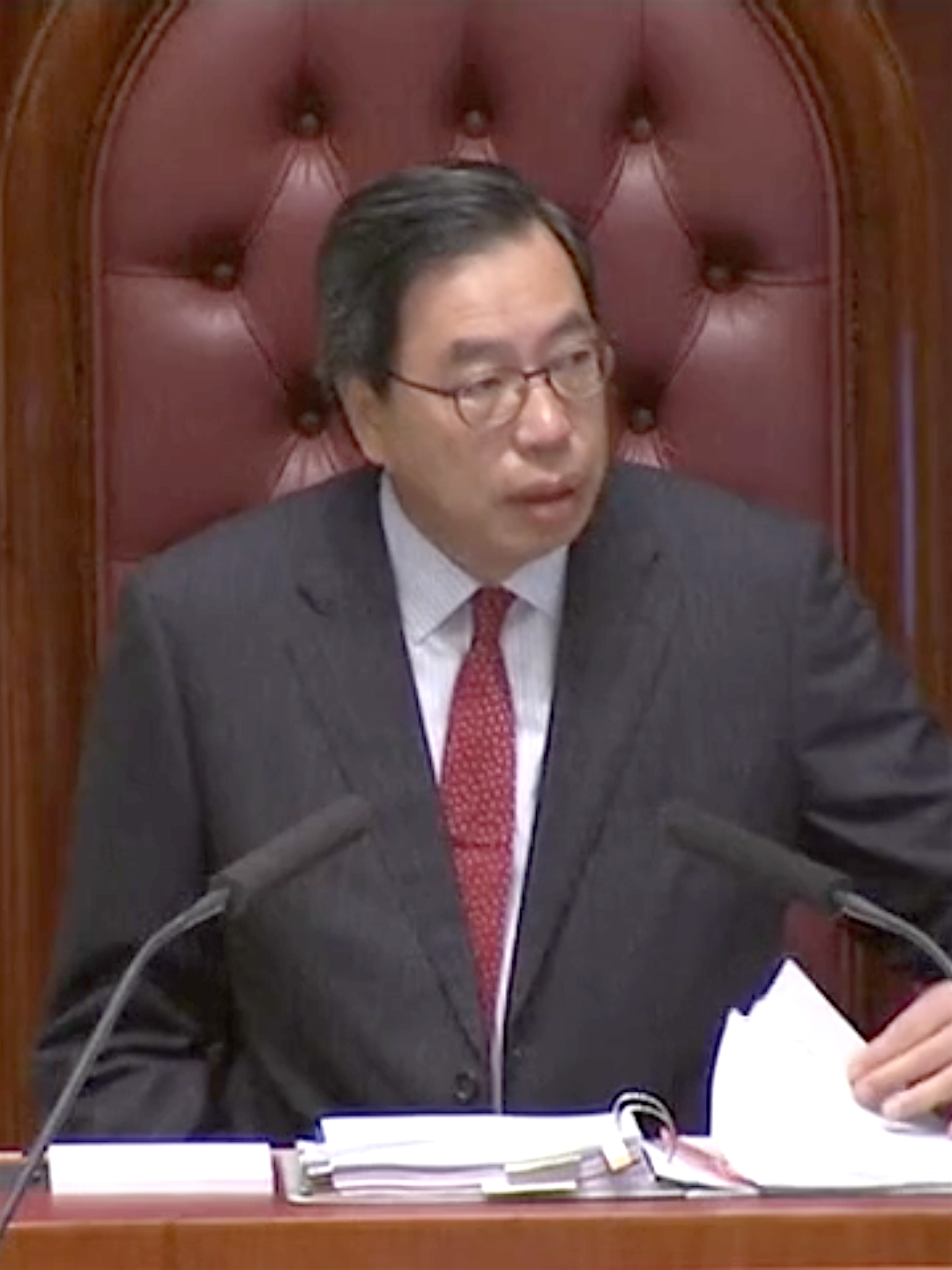
President Andrew Leung

=== Presiding ===
- President: Andrew Leung (BPA)

=== Pro-Beijing camp ===
- Convenor: Martin Liao
- Deputy Convenor: Starry Lee

=== Non-aligned ===
- Tik Chi-yuen (as the only member who does not belong to the Pro-Beijing camp)

== Secretariat ==
- Secretary General:
  - Kenneth Chen until 31 July 2024
  - Dora Wai from 1 August 2024

== Composition ==
Elected

At dissolution

Affiliation	Members	
Affiliation	Elected	At dissolution
DAB	19	19
BPA	7	9
FTU	8	7
NPP	5	6
Liberal	4	4
FEW	2	3
FLU	2	2
Roundtable	1	1
PP	1	1
KWND	1	1
New Prospect	1	1
New Forum	1	1
Third Side	1	1
Independent	37	33
Vacant	0	1
Total	90	

== List of Members ==
In this Legislative Council, 59 of the 90 members elected in the 2021 election were elected for the first time, or were not members of the last Legislative Council. All members are listed by seniority according to the year of the beginning of consecutive service then the order of swearing in (i.e. the number of strokes in the traditional characters of names in Chinese per precedent) with the president of the Legislative Council being ranked first.

Members who did not serve throughout the term are italicised. Supplementary members elected in by-elections are listed below.

Capacity	Constituency	Portrait	Elected Members	Elected Party	Political Alignment	Born	Occupation(s)	Assumed Office
President of the Legislative Council
FC	Industrial (First)		Andrew Leung	BPA	Pro-Beijing	24 February 1951	Merchant	2004
Other members
FC	Catering		Tommy Cheung	Liberal	Pro-Beijing	30 September 1949	Merchant; Legislative Councillor	2000
FC	Commercial (First)		Jeffrey Lam	BPA	Pro-Beijing	23 October 1951	Merchant	2004
GC	Kowloon Central		Starry Lee	DAB	Pro-Beijing	13 March 1974	Accountant; Legislative Councillor	2008
GC	New Territories North East		Chan Hak-kan	DAB/NTAS	Pro-Beijing	24 April 1976	Legislative Councillor	2008
FC	Insurance		Chan Kin-por	Independent	Pro-Beijing	10 May 1954	Legislative Councillor; Chief Executive	2008
ECC	Election Committee		Priscilla Leung	BPA/KWND	Pro-Beijing	18 November 1960	Professor; Barrister-at-law	2008
GC	Hong Kong Island West		Regina Ip	NPP	Pro-Beijing	24 August 1950	Chair of Savantas Policy Institute	2008
ECC	Election Committee		Paul Tse	Independent	Pro-Beijing	21 January 1959	Solicitor	2008
GC	New Territories North West		Michael Tien	Roundtable	Pro-Beijing	26 August 1950	Legislative Councillor; Entrepreneur	2012
FC	Agriculture and Fisheries		Steven Ho	DAB	Pro-Beijing	30 November 1979	Legislative Councillor	2012
FC	Transport		Frankie Yick	Liberal	Pro-Beijing	1953	Company Director	2012
ECC	Election Committee		Ma Fung-kwok	New Forum	Pro-Beijing	22 July 1955	Managing Director	2012
GC	New Territories South West		Chan Han-pan	DAB/NTAS	Pro-Beijing	1975	Legislative Councillor	2012
ECC	Election Committee		Alice Mak (Note: Ceased to hold office as a member of Legislative Council upon resignation on 19 June 2022.)	FTU	Pro-Beijing	1 November 1971	Legislative Councillor	2012
GC	Labour		Kwok Wai-keung	FTU	Pro-Beijing	15 April 1978	Legislative Councillor; Eastern District Councillor	2012
ECC	Election Committee		Elizabeth Quat	DAB	Pro-Beijing	23 December 1966	Legislative Councillor	2012
FC	Commercial (Second)		Martin Liao	Independent	Pro-Beijing	1957	Barrister-at-law	2012
FC	Engineering		Lo Wai-kwok	BPA	Pro-Beijing	25 December 1953	Engineer	2012
FC	Industrial (Second)		Jimmy Ng	BPA	Pro-Beijing	17 June 1969	Company Director	2016
ECC	Election Committee		Junius Ho	Independent	Pro-Beijing	4 June 1962	Solicitor	2016
GC	New Territories North West		Holden Chow	DAB	Pro-Beijing	7 June 1979	Solicitor	2016
FC	Wholesale and Retail		Shiu Ka-fai	Liberal	Pro-Beijing	22 April 1970	Company Director	2016
ECC	Election Committee		Yung Hoi-yan	NPP/CF	Pro-Beijing	7 June 1977	Barrister-at-law	2016
FC	Finance		Chan Chun-ying	Independent	Pro-Beijing	1961	Advisor	2016
ECC	Election Committee		Cheung Kwok-kwan	DAB	Pro-Beijing	30 June 1974	Solicitor	2016
ECC	Election Committee		Luk Chung-hung	FTU	Pro-Beijing	21 September 1978	Legislative Councillor	2016
GC	New Territories North		Lau Kwok-fan	DAB/NTAS	Pro-Beijing	28 June 1978	Legislative Councillor	2016
FC	Heung Yee Kuk		Kenneth Lau	BPA	Pro-Beijing	1966	Merchant	2016
GC	Kowloon West		Vincent Cheng	DAB	Pro-Beijing	18 July 1979	Legislative Councillor	2018 (b)
FC	Architectural, Surveying, Planning and Landscape		Tony Tse	Independent	Pro-Beijing	27 October 1954	Surveyor	2018 (b)
ECC	Election Committee		Doreen Kong	Independent	Pro-Beijing	12 July 1970	Solicitor	2022
FC	Education		Chu Kwok-keung	FEW	Pro-Beijing	Unknown	School Principal	2022
GC	New Territories South East		Stanley Li	DAB/NTAS	Pro-Beijing	12 August 1983	Legislative Councillor	2022
ECC	Election Committee		Hoey Simon Lee	Independent	Pro-Beijing	1977	Chief Strategy Officer	2022
FC	Financial Services		Robert Lee	Independent	Pro-Beijing	1980	Company Director	2022
GC	New Territories North East		Dominic Lee	NPP/CF	Pro-Beijing	22 January 1984	Company Director	2022
FC	Social Welfare		Tik Chi-yuen	Third Side	Non-aligned	24 September 1957	Legislative Councillor	2022
ECC	Election Committee		Lee Chun-keung	Liberal	Pro-Beijing	22 August 1984	Legislative Councillor; Manager	2022
GC	Hong Kong Island East		Stanley Ng	FTU	Pro-Beijing	1970	Trade Unionist	2022
ECC	Election Committee		Johnny Ng	Independent	Pro-Beijing	1974	Company Director	2022
FC	Labour		Chau Siu-chung	FLU	Pro-Beijing	1970	Trade Unionist	2022
ECC	Election Committee		Chow Man-kong	Independent	Pro-Beijing	Unknown	Associate Vice President of the Education University of Hong Kong	2022
FC	Medical and Health Services		David Lam	Independent	Pro-Beijing	1966	Surgeon	2022
ECC	Election Committee		Lam Chun-sing	FLU	Pro-Beijing	1981	Trade Unionist	2022
GC	New Territories South East		Lam So-wai	Professional Power	Pro-Beijing	31 December 1987	Legislative Councillor	2022
ECC	Election Committee		Nixie Lam	DAB	Pro-Beijing	13 March 1982	Legislative Councillor	2022
ECC	Election Committee		Nelson Lam	Independent	Pro-Beijing	20 August 1968	Accountant	2022
ECC	Election Committee		Dennis Lam	Independent	Pro-Beijing	13 March 1982	Doctor	2022
FC	Legal		Lam San-keung	Independent	Pro-Beijing	1961	Solicitor	2022
ECC	Election Committee		Andrew Lam	Independent	Pro-Beijing	1961	Company Chairman	2022
FC	Technology and Innovation		Duncan Chiu	Independent	Pro-Beijing	1974	Merchant	2022
FC	Tourism		Yiu Pak-leung	Independent	Pro-Beijing	11 March 1974	Chairman of the China Travel Service (Hong Kong)	2022
ECC	Election Committee		Wendy Hong	Independent	Pro-Beijing	1975	Head of Research	2022
ECC	Election Committee		Sun Dong	Independent	Pro-Beijing	1967	Chair Professor of the City University of Hong Kong	2022
FC	Labour		Dennis Leung	FTU	Pro-Beijing	6 October 1973	Community Officer	2022
GC	Kowloon West		Leung Man-kwong	KWND	Pro-Beijing	3 August 1984	Legislative Councillor	2022
GC	Hong Kong Island East		Edward Leung	DAB	Pro-Beijing	8 March 1985	Legislative Councillor	2022
ECC	Election Committee		Kenneth Leung	Independent	Pro-Beijing	3 March 1984	Legislative Councillor	2022
ECC	Election Committee		Chan Yuet-ming	Independent	Pro-Beijing	1972	Legislative Councillor; North District Councillor	2022
ECC	Election Committee		Rock Chen	DAB	Pro-Beijing	6 June 1966	Investment Manager; Company Director	2022
ECC	Election Committee		Chan Pui-leung	Independent	Pro-Beijing	1959	Legislative Councillor; China Taiping Insurance (HK) Company Limited General Manager	2022
FC	HKSAR members of NPC and CPPCC, Representatives of National Organisations		Chan Yung	DAB/NTAS	Pro-Beijing	6 June 1966	Hong Kong Deputies to the National People's Congress; Legislative Councillor; Social Worker	2022
FC	Textiles and Garment		Sunny Tan	Independent (Note: Joined the Business and Professionals Alliance for Hong Kong in 2022)	Pro-Beijing	1973	Legislative Councillor; Merchant	2022
ECC	Election Committee		Judy Chan	NPP	Pro-Beijing	4 April 1980	Legislative Councillor	2022
ECC	Election Committee		Maggie Chan	Independent	Pro-Beijing	3 February 1969	Solicitor	2022
ECC	Election Committee		Chan Siu-hung	Independent	Pro-Beijing	1958	Engineer	2022
ECC	Election Committee		Chan Hoi-yan	Independent	Pro-Beijing	19 November 1977	Legislative Councillor; Company Director	2022
GC	New Territories South West		Joephy Chan	FTU	Pro-Beijing	16 December 1989	Trade Unionist	2022
GC	Hong Kong Island West		Chan Hok-fung	DAB	Pro-Beijing	1976	Banker	2022
GC	New Territories North		Gary Zhang	New Prospect	Pro-Beijing	1989	Engineer	2022
ECC	Election Committee		Lilian Kwok	DAB	Pro-Beijing	20 April 1979	Teacher	2022
ECC	Election Committee		Benson Luk	BPA	Pro-Beijing	3 December 1983	Chief Strategy Officer	2022
ECC	Election Committee		Wong Yue-shan (Note: Ceased to hold office as a member of Legislative Council upon resignation on 27 December 2022.)	Independent	Pro-Beijing	22 December 1975	Our Hong Kong Foundation Senior Vice President; Executive Director of Public Policy Institute	2022
FC	Import and Export		Kennedy Wong	DAB	Pro-Beijing	23 February 1963	Solicitor	2022
FC	Accountancy		Edmund Wong	DAB	Pro-Beijing	7 January 1985	Accountant	2022
ECC	Election Committee		Kingsley Wong	FTU	Pro-Beijing	1968	Trade Unionist	2022
GC	Kowloon Central		Yang Wing-kit	Independent	Pro-Beijing	1968	Legislative Councillor; Kowloon City District Councillor	2022
ECC	Election Committee		Peter Koon	Independent	Pro-Beijing	2 December 1965	Clergyman	2022
ECC	Election Committee		Tang Fei	FEW	Pro-Beijing	Unknown	Legislative Councillor	2022
GC	Kowloon East		Tang Ka-piu	FTU	Pro-Beijing	29 October 1979	Legislative Councillor	2022
ECC	Election Committee		Lai Tung-kwok	NPP	Pro-Beijing	12 November 1951	Legislative Councillor	2022
ECC	Election Committee		Lau Chi-pang	Independent (Note: Joined the Hong Kong Federation of Education Workers in 2022)	Pro-Beijing	1960	Associate Vice President of Lingnan University	2022
FC	Sports, Performing Arts, Culture and Publication		Kenneth Fok	Independent	Pro-Beijing	2 July 1979	Merchant	2022
FC	Real Estate and Construction		Louis Loong	Independent	Pro-Beijing	1951	Business Executive	2022
GC	Kowloon East		Ngan Man-yu	DAB	Pro-Beijing	31 August 1986	Legislative Councillor; Kwun Tong District Councillor	2022
ECC	Election Committee		Carmen Kan	Independent	Pro-Beijing	1968	Solicitor	2022
ECC	Election Committee		Tan Yueheng	Independent	Pro-Beijing	1962	Chairman of BOCOM International Holdings	2022
ECC	Election Committee		So Cheung-wing	Independent	Pro-Beijing	1960		2022
FC	Commercial (Third)		Yim Kong	Independent	Pro-Beijing	1972	Business Executive	2022
Supplementary members
ECC	Election Committee		Adrian Ho	NPP	Pro-Beijing	1977	Company Director	2022 (b)
ECC	Election Committee		Shang Hailong	Independent	Pro-Beijing	1982	Merchant	2022 (b)
ECC	Election Committee		Chan Wing-kwong	DAB	Pro-Beijing	1963	Chinese Medicine Practitioner; Legislative Councillor	2022 (b)
ECC	Election Committee		William Wong	Independent	Pro-Beijing	1960	Professor of the Chinese University of Hong Kong	2022 (b)

=== Changes ===
- 15 June 2022: Scott Leung (Kowloon West), Kitson Yang (Kowloon Central), Connie Lam (New Territories South East), and Gary Zhang (New Territories North) formed the A4 Alliance.
- 6 July 2022: Sunny Tan (Textiles and Garment) joined the Business and Professionals Alliance for Hong Kong (BPA).
- 1 October 2022: Louis Loong (Real Estate and Construction) joined the BPA.
- 10 December 2022: Lau Chi-pang (Election Committee) became president of Hong Kong Federation of Education Workers.

== Committees ==
- House Committee
  - Parliamentary Liaison Subcommittee
- Finance Committee
  - Establishment Subcommittee
  - Public Works Subcommittee
- Public Accounts Committee
- Committee on Members' Interests
- Committee on Rules of Procedure

=== Panels ===
- Panel on Administration of Justice and Legal Services
- Panel on Commerce and Industry
- Panel on Constitutional Affairs
- Panel on Development
- Panel on Economic Development
- Panel on Education
- Panel on Environmental Affairs
- Panel on Financial Affairs
- Panel on Food Safety and Environmental Hygiene
- Panel on Health Services
- Panel on Home Affairs
- Panel on Housing
- Panel on Information Technology and Broadcasting
- Panel on Manpower
- Panel on Security
- Panel on Transport
- Panel on Welfare Services

== See also ==
- 2021 Hong Kong legislative election
- 2022 President of the Hong Kong Legislative Council election
