= 2022 in politics =

- Years in politics: 2019 2020 2021 2022 2023 2024 2025
- Centuries: 20th century · 21st century · 22nd century
- Decades: 1990s 2000s 2010s 2020s 2030s 2040s 2050s
- Years: 2019 2020 2021 2022 2023 2024 2025

These are some of the notable events relating to politics in 2022.

== January ==
- January 1
  - All works published in 1926, except for some sound recordings, entered the public domain in the United States. Additionally, all sound recordings first published before 1923 entered the public domain in the United States; this was the first such release for sound recordings.
  - The Regional Comprehensive Economic Partnership, the largest free trade area in the world, comes into effect for China, Japan, Vietnam, Thailand, Australia, Cambodia, Laos, Singapore, New Zealand, and Brunei.
- January 10
  - The 2022 President of the Hong Kong Legislative Council election took place on 10 January 2022 for members of the 7th Legislative Council of Hong Kong to among themselves elect the President of the Legislative Council of Hong Kong for the duration of the council.
- January 14
  - The United States said that the Russian government had deployed saboteurs to eastern Ukraine to stage a fabricated attack on Russian proxy separatists in eastern Donetsk and Luhansk to provide Putin with a pretext for a renewed invasion of Ukraine. The U.S. said that the Russian operatives were trained in urban warfare and explosives. The Russian government denied seeking a pretext to invade.
- January 17
  - Beginning in January 2022, the Russians began a slow evacuation of personnel from its embassy in Kyiv; it was unclear if the withdrawals of the personnel were "part propaganda, part preparation for a conflict or part feint" or some combination.
- January 18
  - By mid-January 2022, a Ukrainian Defense Ministry's intelligence assessment estimated that the Russians had almost completed a military buildup on the Ukrainian border, amassing 127,000 troops in the region (of which 106,000 were Russian Armed Forces land group forces and the remaining being sea and air forces) and further supporting more than 35,000 Russian-backed separatist forces and 3,000 Russian forces in rebel-held eastern Ukraine. The assessment estimated that Russia had deployed 36 Iskander medium-range ballistic missile systems near the Ukrainian borders of Ukraine, each with a range of 500–700 km (310–430 mi), many stationed within striking distance of Kyiv. The assessment also reported intensified Russian intelligence and combat sustainment units, such as movements of ammunition and field hospitals.
  - Russian troops were reported to have sent an unspecified number of troops into Belarus. The official reason was to conduct war games with Belarus in the following month, however several officials from Ukraine and the White House stated that the troop presence in Belarus would be used to attack Ukraine from the north, especially since the Ukrainian capital Kyiv is located very close to the Belarusian–Ukrainian border.
- January 21
  - Lavrov and U.S. Secretary of State Antony Blinken met in Geneva. Blinken emphasized "was not a negotiation but a candid exchange of concerns and ideas". Following the meeting, Blinken said that the U.S. had made clear to Russia that its renewed invasion would "be met with swift, severe and a united response from the United States and our partners and allies." The U.S. delivered a formal written response to Russia's demands on 26 January. The response rejected Moscow's demand that Ukraine never join NATO. Blinken stated that the documents outlined "concerns of the United States and our allies and partners about Russia's actions that undermine security, a principled and pragmatic evaluation of the concerns that Russia has raised, and our own proposals for areas where we may be able to find common ground."
- January 22
  - the British government said that Russia was organizing a plan to supplant Ukraine's government via military force and install a pro-Russian puppet administration in the country, potentially led by Yevheniy Murayev, a former member of the Ukrainian parliament. Murayev and the Russian government denied the allegation, with the latter blaming the "NATO countries, led by the Anglo-Saxons" for the Russo-Ukrainian war.
  - the Biden administration also granted permission to the Baltic nations (Lithuania, Latvia and Estonia) to transfer U.S.-made equipment to Ukraine. Estonia donated FGM-148 Javelin anti-tank missiles to Ukraine, while Latvia and Lithuania provided FIM-92 Stinger air defense systems and associated equipment. Other NATO members also provided aid to Ukraine. Preexisting UK and Canadian military training programs were bolstered in January 2022, with the British deploying additional military trainers and providing light anti-armor defense systems, and the Canadians deploying a small special forces delegation to aid Ukraine.
- January 23
  - A coup d'état in Burkina Faso removes president Roch Kaboré from power. The Burkinabé military cites the government's failure to contain activities of Islamist militants within the country as a reason for the coup.
- January 26
  - A Normandy Format meeting was planned between Russian, Ukrainian, German and French senior officials in Paris on 26 January 2022, with a followup phone call between the French and Russian presidents Macron and Putin on 28 January. Ukraine fulfilled Russia's condition for a meeting in Paris and decided to withdraw from Parliament the controversial draft law on the reintegration of the Crimea and Donbas region, because it was viewed that the law was contrary to the Minsk peace agreements.

== February ==
- February 24
  - Russia launched an invasion of Ukraine. The campaign started after a prolonged military buildup, the Russian recognition of the self-proclaimed Donetsk People's Republic and Luhansk People's Republic in the days prior to the invasion, followed by the entrance of the Russian Armed Forces to the Donbas region of Eastern Ukraine on 21 February 2022.

== May ==
- May 9 – Sri Lankan Prime Minister Mahinda Rajapaksa resigns from his post amidst violent clashes and the worsening economic crisis. In response, Rajapaksa loyalists stage a violent assault against anti-government protesters at the GotaGoGama protest site, leaving over 130 were wounded or hospitalized.
- May 12 – Ranil Wickremesinghe is appointed as the new prime minister of Sri Lanka.
- May 23 – Anthony Albanese of the Australian Labor Party became Prime Minister of Australia.

== June ==
- June 12: Iraqi political crisis: dozens of MPs resign from the Iraqi Parliament.

== July ==
- July 5 – A government crisis in the United Kingdom culminates with the resignation of Prime Minister Boris Johnson.
- July 8 – Former Prime Minister of Japan Shinzo Abe is assassinated while giving a public speech in the city of Nara, Japan.
- July 9 – After hundreds of thousands of protestors storm the president's official residence in Sri Lanka, President Gotabaya Rajapaksa announces he will resign on 13 July and Prime Minister Ranil Wickremesinghe announces his intention to resign once a new all-party government is formed.
- July 11 – A vote of no confidence in the government of Élisabeth Borne fails in the French Parliament.
- July 14 – After fleeing the country the day before, Sri Lankan President Gotabaya Rajapaksa emails his resignation letter to the Speaker of the Parliament from Singapore, officially ending his presidency.
- July 20 − The Parliament of Sri Lanka elects Prime Minister Ranil Wickremesinghe as President of Sri Lanka, following the resignation of Gotabaya Rajapaksa amid protests over the ongoing economic crisis. The following day, Wickremesinghe is sworn in as the 9th President of Sri Lanka, and he appoints Dinesh Gunawardena as his prime minister.

== August ==
- August 4: The prime minister of Peru, Aníbal Torres, resigns following multiple criminal investigations against the President of Peru, Pedro Castillo.
- August 19 – The coalition government of Montenegrin prime minister Dritan Abazović collapses after the 81-seat Parliament of Montenegro passes a motion of no confidence in a vote of 50–1, following dispute within the coalition over an agreement the government signed with the Serbian Orthodox Church.

== September ==
- September 5: Liz Truss beats Rishi Sunak and is declared leader of the Conservative Party after the July–September 2022 Conservative Party leadership election.
- September 6: The Queen appoints Liz Truss as Prime Minister of the United Kingdom.
- September 8: HM Queen Elizabeth II dies after 70 years on the throne. She was succeeded by her eldest son Charles.
- September 16: Mahsa "Zhina" Amini, a 22-year-old Kurdish Iranian women was beaten to death by the morality police of Iran for allegedly wearing her hijab too loosely. Her death sparked protests all over the world for "Woman, Life, Freedom".

== October ==
- October 16: 20th National Congress of the Chinese Communist Party will be held in Beijing, that incumbent CCP General Secretary Xi Jinping is widely believed to be re-elected as party leader.
- October 20: A government crisis in the United Kingdom culminates with the resignation of Prime Minister Liz Truss, making her the shortest-serving prime minister in the history of the United Kingdom.
- October 23: Xi Jinping is elected as General Secretary of the Chinese Communist Party by the Central Committee, beginning a third term of the paramount leader of China.
- October 24: Rishi Sunak is declared leader of the Conservative Party after being elected unopposed in the October 2022 Conservative Party leadership election.
- October 25: The King appoints Rishi Sunak as Prime Minister of the United Kingdom.

== November ==
- November 4: Ishmael Kalsakau is elected unopposed by secret ballot as the new prime minister of Vanuatu, succeeding Bob Loughman.
