= Deliberation Tsuen Wan =

Deliberation Tsuen Wan 荃民議政
- Founded: 6 July 2019; 7 years ago
- Ideology: Localism (HK); Liberalism (HK)
- Regional affiliation: Pro-democracy camp
- Colours: Turquoise and green
- Legislative Council: 0 / 90
- Tsuen Wan District Council: 0 / 22

Deliberation Tsuen Wan (Chinese: 荃民議政) is a localist political group based in Tsuen Wan founded on 6 July 2019. In a historic pro-democracy landslide in 2019 District Council election, the group won two seats in the Tsuen Wan District Council.

== History ==
Deliberation Tsuen Wan was formed on 6 July 2019 ahead of the 2019 District Council election by a group of Tsuen Wan residents. The group co-organised the Tsuen Wan and Kwai Tsing march on 25 August 2019 amid the anti-extradition bill protests. After the police fired tear gas at the protesters, the group organised volunteer cleaners to wash off the tear gas residue at the market in Yeung Uk Road, fearing the chemicals would poison the food there.

The group filled three candidates in the 2019 election, with Jackson Lau contesting in Tak Wah, Tam Pui-yan in Tsuen Wan Rural and Adrian Lau challenging legislator Michael Tien in Discovery Park. Jackson Lau and Adrian Lau were elected, with Tam losing to incumbent Norris Ng with narrow margin of votes.

== Electoral performance ==
=== Tsuen Wan District Council elections ===
Election	Number of popular votes	% of popular votes	Total elected seats	+/−
2019	9,516	7.65	2 / 19	2 ▲
