= Discovery Park (constituency) =

- Elected constituency for the Tsuen Wan District Council
- Boundary of Discovery Park in Tsuen Wan District
- District: Tsuen Wan
- Legislative Council constituency: New Territories South West
- Population: 16,074 (2019)
- Electorate: 10,517 (2019)

Current constituency
- Created: 1999
- Number of members: One
- Member: Lau Cheuk-yu (Deliberation Tsuen Wan)

Discovery Park is one of the 17 constituencies in the Tsuen Wan District.

The constituency returns one district councillor to the Tsuen Wan District Council, with an election every four years. The seat has been currently held by Lau Cheuk-Yu. Discovery Park constituency is loosely based on the Discovery Park and Tsuen King Garden with estimated population of 16,074.

== Councillors represented ==
Election	Member	Party
1999	Louis Wong Yui-tak	Democratic
2011	Michael Tien Puk-sun	NPP
2017	Michael Tien Puk-sun	Roundtable
2019	Lau Cheuk-yu	Deliberation Tsuen Wan

== Election results ==
=== 2010s ===
Tsuen Wan District Council Election, 2019: Discovery Park
Party	Candidate	Votes	%	±%
Deliberation TW	Lau Cheuk-yu	4,498	54.18	
Roundtable	Michael Tien Puk-sun	3,804	45.82	−18.68
Majority		694	8.36	
Turnout		8,326	79.17	
Deliberation TW gain from Roundtable		Swing		

Tsuen Wan District Council Election, 2015: Discovery Park
Party	Candidate	Votes	%	±%
NPP	Michael Tien Puk-sun	3,674	64.5	+11.5
Labour	Chiu Yan-loy	2,020	35.5	
Majority		1,654	29.0	
Turnout		5,757	61.0	
NPP hold		Swing		

Tsuen Wan District Council Election, 2011: Discovery Park
Party	Candidate	Votes	%	±%
NPP	Michael Tien Puk-sun	2,256	53.0	
Democratic	Louis Wong Yui-tak	2,002	47.0	
NPP gain from Democratic		Swing		

=== 2000s ===
Tsuen Wan District Council Election, 2007: Discovery Park
Party	Candidate	Votes	%	±%
Democratic	Louis Wong Yui-tak	Unopposed		
Democratic hold		Swing		

Tsuen Wan District Council Election, 2003: Discovery Park
Party	Candidate	Votes	%	±%
Democratic	Louis Wong Yui-tak	2,305	74.6	−0.1
DAB	Tse Long	783	25.4	
Democratic hold		Swing		

=== 1990s ===
Tsuen Wan District Council Election, 1999: Discovery Park
Party	Candidate	Votes	%	±%
Democratic	Louis Wong Yui-tak	922	74.7	
Liberal	Tam Tai-on	683	35.1	
Independent	Fu Yiu-wah	202	10.4	
Independent	Edwin Chow Kwok-siu	133	6.8	
Democratic win (new seat)				
