= Mandatory Reporting of Child Abuse Ordinance =

Legislation of Hong Kong

Legislative Council of Hong Kong
- Long title: An Ordinance to require certain professionals to report suspected serious child abuse cases; to provide for protection for the professionals for making the reports; and to provide for related matters.
- Citation: Cap. 650
- Passed by: Legislative Council of Hong Kong
- Passed: 11 July 2024
- Signed: 18 July 2024
- Commenced: 20 January 2026

Legislative history
- Bill title: Mandatory Reporting of Child Abuse Bill
- Introduced by: Secretary for Labour and Welfare Chris Sun
- Introduced: 2 June 2023
- First reading: 14 June 2023
- Second reading: 14 June 2023; 11 July 2024 (Resumption of second reading)
- Committee of the whole: 11 July 2024
- Third reading: 11 July 2024

Keywords
- Child Abuse, Mandatory Reporting
- Status: Current legislation

Mandatory Reporting of Child Abuse Ordinance
- Traditional Chinese: 強制舉報虐待兒童條例
- Simplified Chinese: 强制举报虐待儿童条例
Transcriptions
Standard Mandarin
- Hanyu Pinyin: Qiángzhì jǔbào nüèdài értóng tiáolì

The Mandatory Reporting of Child Abuse Ordinance is an ordinance passed by the Legislative Council of Hong Kong, which aims to protect children from abuse and neglect. It was raised by the Chief Executive John Lee in his 2022 Policy Address, to address the public concerns over child abuses. The ordinance comes into force on 20 January 2026.

== Background ==
=== Increase in child abuse cases ===
Since 2016, the increasing trend of newly registered cases of child abuse (from 892 in 2016 to 1,367 in 2021.) has begun to draw public attention.

In January 2018, the murder case of a five-year-old girl, Chan Sui-lam, in Tuen Mun shocked the community, and was described to be the most severe child abuse case since the foundation of Hong Kong. Chan was certified dead after being found unconscious at home. Her body was covered in over 133 injuries while her older brother, who survived, had suffered a similar amount of harm. It was later discovered that she was continuously abused by her father, Chan Hoi-ping, and step mother Wong Hiu-tung, leading to her weak immunity and bacteria infection, and her death from scurvy eventually. The principal of Fu Tai Lutheran Day Nursery, the kindergarten which Chan used to be in until October 2018, claimed that the school did not find any injuries on Chan. Yet, photos of Chan's wounds taken in the nursery dating back to 5 to 25 September were exposed and verified. The whistleblower of the photos added that the teacher who first noticed Chan's injuries had submitted a report regarding Chan's situation but the report was not presented to the Education Bureau. This led to public suspicion on the credibility of Yu for her not reporting the case truthfully. In addition to more child abuse cases happened in the following years, such as a 22-month-old infant been abused and murdered in 2019, and case of Children's Residential Home in 2021, debates on whether existing child protection is sufficient were further intensified.

=== Voluntary reporting ===
Social Welfare Department has drawn up a procedural guide for reference by different professionals in taking necessary actions for suspected child maltreatment cases. To facilitate early identification of child abuse, in November 2016 Social Welfare Department set up a task group to review and revise the guide for provision of clearer guidelines regarding scope of child abuse and report mechanism of cases. The revised version, ‘Protecting Children from Maltreatment – Procedural Guide for Multi-disciplinary Co-operation (Revised 2020)’, was endorsed during the meeting of the Committee on Child Abuse on 20 December 2019 and took effect starting from 1 April 2020.

However, the new guide was criticised out of the voluntary report mechanism allowing gray areas that professionals may choose not to report the case. The critique was supported by the Management Committee Director, Donna Wong, who put forward that the voluntary report mechanism was unenforceable and making it mandatory would reduce tragedies from happening. Meanwhile, in 2019, The Law Reform Commission of Hong Kong released the ‘Causing or Allowing the Death or Serious Harm of a Child or Vulnerable Adult (HKLRC Consultation Paper)’. The paper included research on mandatory reporting of child abuse and proposed an offence of ‘failure to protect’ to mandate persons noticing abnormal injuries of children to report, arousing demand for a mandatory report mechanism for timely intervention in child abuse cases.

== Timeline ==
Development of the Bill

Date	Event
April 2021	A court judgment concerning the death of a 5-year-old-girl because of the abuse from her parent with the lack of reporting, triggering government's attention on child abuse reporting mechanism.
July 2021	Government sets up cross-bureaux working group to explore the possibility of setting up the Bill.
Q3 2021 & Q3-4 2022	Two rounds of stakeholder engagement sessions and LegCo Committee Consultations. (Note 1)
October 2022	The Chief Executive mentions the introducing of the Bill into LegCo in the first half of 2023 in 2022 Policy Address.
23 May 2023	The council advised and CE ordered to introduce the bill into LegCo at Executive Council.

Note 1: Two rounds of stakeholder engagement sessions were conducted in the third quarter of 2021 and the latter half of 2022 respectively. Professional bodies in the social welfare sector, education sector, healthcare sectors, as well as school representatives, were invited to offer their opinions and concerns on the bills in the engagement sessions. The government also consulted the relevant committees in the Legislative Council, including the Commission on Children, Social Welfare Advisory Committee, Family Council and Women's Commission in the latter half of 2021 and 2022 respectively.

The government received 119 written submissions from the relevant stakeholders in the two rounds of engagement sessions mentioned above.

Legislative Process

Date	Event
2 June 2023	Publication in the Gazette
14 June 2023	First Reading received
14 June 2023	Commencement of the Second Reading debate
25 July 2023	First meeting of Bills Committee
Pending / To be notified	Resumption of Second Reading debate
Pending / To be notified	Committee Stage
Pending / To be notified	Third Reading

== Reception ==
There are different voices towards the Ordinance. While there is a general consensus across various sectors of society that legislating mandatory reporting of child abuse is a step in the right direction, there are also certain concerns.

=== Protecting children ===
The bill was well supported by different stakeholders due to the view on protecting children. The 2022 Policy Address, in response to the child abuse cases in recent years, introduces the Mandatory Reporting of Child Abuse Bill into the LegCo in the first half of 2023. Members of the Legislative Council, such as Michael Tien Puk-sun and Elizabeth Quat, strongly agreed with it - It is one of the significant responsibilities of the government to protect children and provide them with a healthy environment for growth; The relevant legislation work should be completed as soon as possible. Besides, many NGOs, such as The Hong Kong Council of Social Service (HKCSS) and Hong Kong Christian Service, shared similar opinions, which prioritized the welfare of children and welcomed the government to revise the child protection legislation. Last but not least, many media have reported on the topic, one of the presses, Wenweipo, also urged the government to complete the legislation process as soon as possible and believed that it is a symbol of social progress.

=== Potential secondary harm to children ===
There is a worry about potential secondary harm to children raised by Wenweipo: When the abuser is the child's caregiver, reporting the abuse may result in the child being removed from their caregiver and left without proper care, potentially causing additional harm or secondary trauma to the child.

=== Early intervention and prevention ===
Another reason for support is to promote early detection and intervention - It is also the aim of setting up a mandatory reporting mechanism, which was state by the Secretary for Labour and Welfare Chris Sun Yuk-han. The NGO HKCSS supported it as well - Since by reporting child abuse cases early, immediate protection and support can be provided to victims and their families. It can potentially prevent further abuse and facilitate the healing process.

=== Wastage of police resources due to overcorrection ===
Opponents believed the legislation could result in an overwhelming number of reports, but not all cases reported truly warrant police intervention. The resources could be better allocated to investigating more severe cases of abuse.

Both the deputy director of the Hong Kong Society for Community Organization Sze Lai-shan and the President of the Hong Kong Kindergarten Association Tong Siu-fun showed their concern on the over-reporting as the mandatory reporters may report all suspected cases regardless of the severity, to pass the buck and protect themselves from legal consequences.

=== Encouraging reporting and deterrence ===
Mandatory reporting sends a strong message that child abuse will not be tolerated - The existence of legal consequences for failing to report suspected abuse cases will act as a deterrent and encourage individuals to fulfill their moral and legal obligations to protect children.

The Secretary for Labour and Welfare Chris Sun Yuk-han added that the Mandatory Reporting of Child Abuse Bill can achieve acting as a deterrent to perpetrators of abuse as the mandatory reporters include professionals in different fields. The Press, Wenweipo, also agreed the regulations can encourage reporting and deter perpetrators.

=== Light penalties for offenders ===
The member of the Legislative Council, Michael Tien Puk-sun, criticized the government on his social media despite his support for the bills’ legislation. He argues that the related penalties (i.e. A three-month imprisonment) specified in the draft are too lenient to serve as a strong deterrent.

=== International standards ===
Many countries around the world have already implemented mandatory reporting laws for child abuse. The supporters believed Hong Kong should align itself with international standards in child protection.

Both the press (Wenweipo) and the NGO (HKCSS) mentioned about the United Nations Convention on the Rights of the Child, which recommended that the Hong Kong government should establish a mandatory reporting mechanism, as early as 2013.

=== Unclear guidelines revision ===
The Education Sector was also concerned about the reporting procedures. The existing guidelines or proposed revisions to the legislation are vague, leaving room for interpretation and potentially leading to inconsistent reporting practices. The lack of clear guidelines could result in confusion or hesitancy to report suspicions of abuse, as they may fear making an incorrect judgment. They hope the government could explain the details of the legislation by organizing seminars or training courses and provide clearer guidance on how to handle different situations (e.g. The responsibilities of parents who do not cooperate) for implementation and undergo periodic reviews by professionals from various fields.

=== Strain on relationships ===
Another concern is about straining the relationships. Since once the report is made, the follow-up investigation can involve questioning and scrutiny of the alleged abuser. It will further deteriorate the relationship and even lead resentment, anger, and hostility from the alleged abuser towards the reporter. Jan Gin-foon, who represents the Government Secondary School Principals' Association, expressed concern that reporting child abuse strains the relationship between teachers and parents, potentially leading to complaints against schools.

If the allegations of child abuse are unsubstantiated or false, the strain on the relationship caused by mandatory reporting can be even more pronounced. Sze Lai-shan, the deputy director of the Hong Kong Society for Community Organization, agreed on the statement as the report can potentially cause long-term damage to the parent-child relationship.

== Similar bills in other jurisdictions ==
Globally, there are comparable enactments of mandatory reporting of child abuse bills. Countries such as Australia, Canada, and the United States have introduced mandatory reporting duties, aiming to identify cases of child abuse and neglect and provide subsequent protection for children. Despite some variations in the time of introduction and details of the mandatory reporting system across and within jurisdictions, some common features are observed.

In terms of the scope of abuse subject to mandatory reporting, known cases of physical, mental, and sexual child abuse and neglect needed to be reported. Suspected cases in which there are reasonable grounds for believing a child has been or is at high risk of being abused are also encouraged to report.

Similar to the proposed bill in Hong Kong, individuals subject to mandatory reporting duty in other jurisdictions are by large professionals who have frequent contact with children, such as those working in healthcare settings, teachers, and social workers.

Sanctions will also be imposed on report failure. Mandated reporters who fail to comply with the law are subject to varying fines and imprisonment. For example, the penalty for not reporting ranges from 10 to 200 penalty units in Australia. As one penalty unit is currently equivalent to A$192.31, it implies that the offender will potentially be charged for a maximum of A$38462, imprisonment for 6 months, or both.

Contrastingly, some countries did not implement mandatory reporting laws based on various justifications. For example, the government of the United Kingdom (UK) decided not to introduce a mandatory reporting duty after a public consultation in 2016. Concerns were raised regarding the effectiveness of mandatory reporting in improving practitioners’ judgment and its potential impact on the social care systems’ ability to identify key cases amidst an increasing number of referrals. These concerns have hindered the UK government from enforcing a mandatory reporting law. Similarly, the government has decided not to enact a law for fear of potential adverse impacts on children's and families’ interests in New Zealand.
