= G2000 =

Hong Kong retail group

- Type: Public
- Industry: Retail
- Founded: 1980; 46 years ago (as G2000) in Hong Kong
- Founder: Michael Tien
- Headquarters: Hong Kong
- Key people: Michael Tien
- Products: Apparel
- Number of employees: 75,000
- Website: http://www.g2000.com.hk

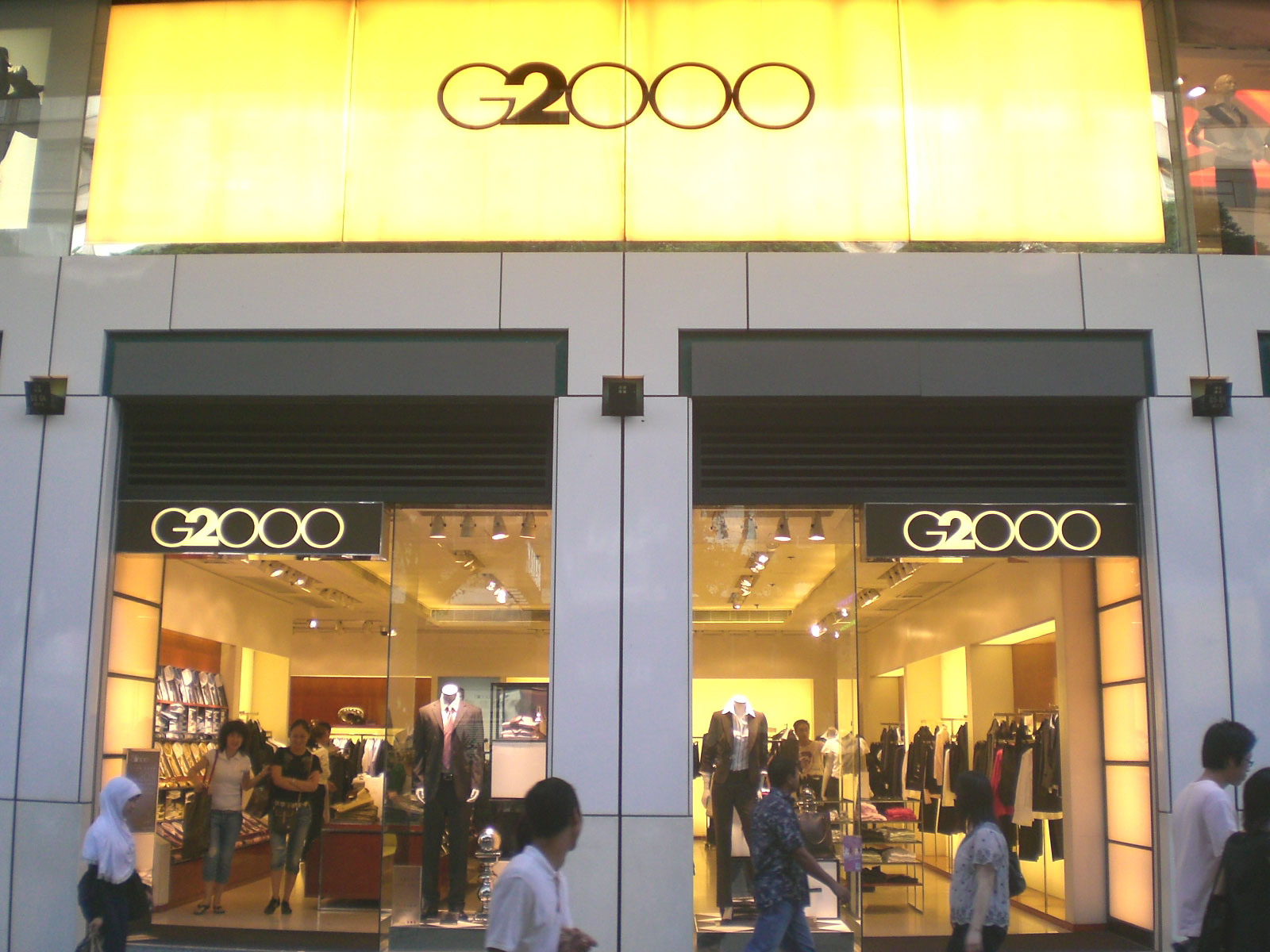
A branch on Park Lane Shopper's Boulevard, Tsim Sha Tsui

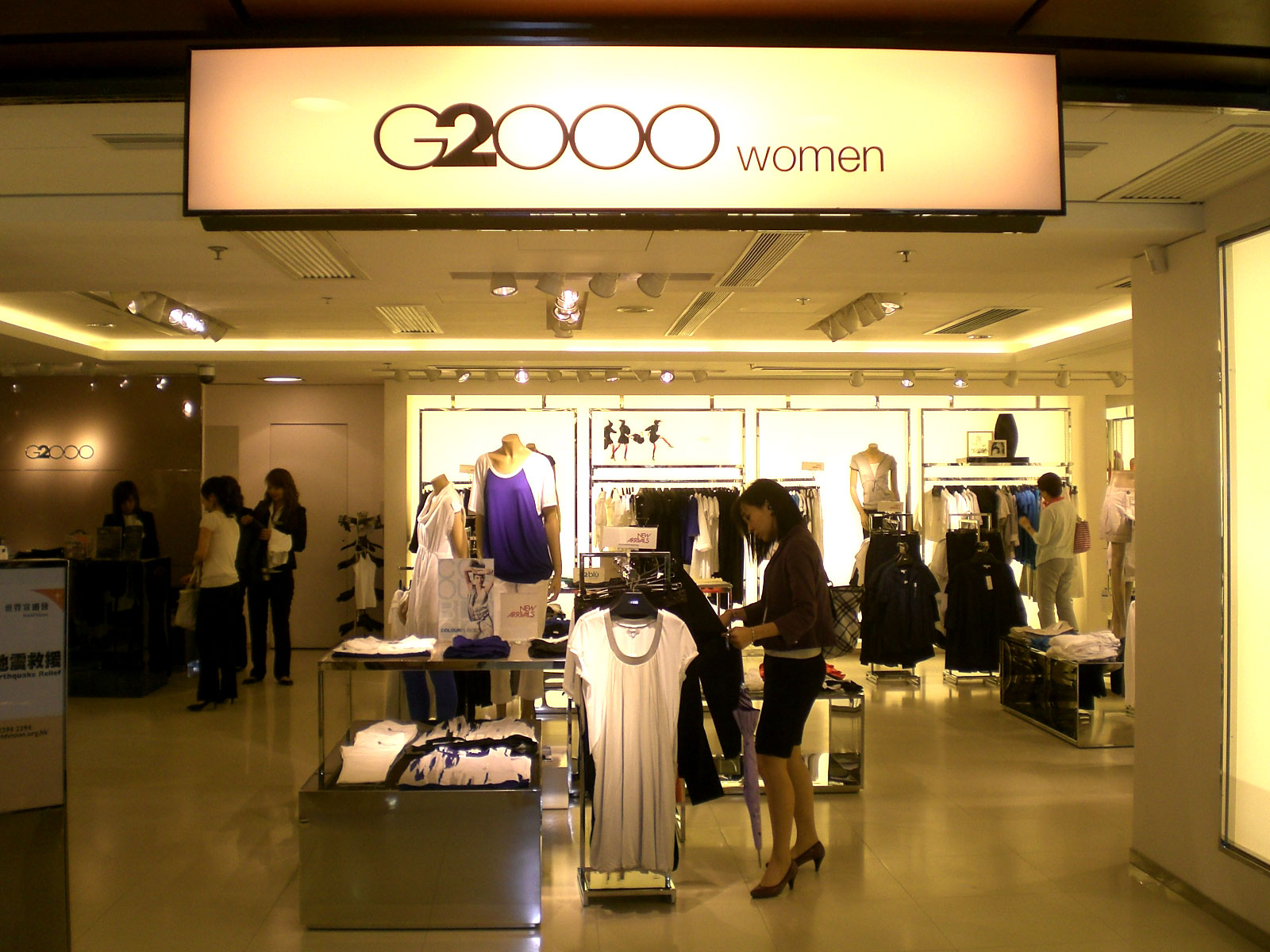
Telford Plaza branch

G2000 (Generation 2000; Chinese: 縱橫二千; Cantonese Yale: Jūngwàang Yihchīn) Group was founded by Michael Tien in 1980 in Hong Kong. The label G2000, first introduced in 1985, was positioned as a specialty clothing chain distributing fashionable men's and women's wear. Today, the G2000 Group is a multi-brand specialty retailer offering an assortment of men's and women's apparel and accessories, with core brands including G2000 MAN, G2000 WOMAN and BLAACK.

Today, the Group operates over 700 outlets in the region covering Hong Kong, Macau, China, India, Singapore, Malaysia, Taiwan, Thailand, Japan, Indonesia, Philippines, Vietnam, Cambodia, Cyprus, Saudi Arabia, United Arab Emirates, Bahrain, Qatar and Jordan.

The brand was originally catered for Asian consumers and clothing sizes.

== Associated brands ==
- G2000 (mens and women)
- G2000 Black (mens; understated luxury)
- At Twenty (mens)
- U2 (mens)

== Locations ==
=== Asia ===
- Hong Kong (Headquarters)
- China
- India (Mumbai only)
- Myanmar
- Indonesia
- Macau
- Malaysia
- Philippines
- Singapore
- Taiwan
- Thailand
- Japan
- Vietnam
- Cambodia
- Republic of Korea

=== Oceania ===
- Australia
- New Zealand

=== Middle East ===
- Bahrain
- Jordan
- Oman
- Saudi Arabia
- United Arab Emirates (temporary closed)
- Lebanon
- Egypt
- Qatar

=== Caribbean ===
- Curaçao
- Aruba

=== North America ===
- Canada

=== South America ===
- Panama
- Brazil
