= Tsuen Wan Rural (constituency) =

- Elected constituency for the Tsuen Wan District Council
- Boundary of Tsuen Wan Rural in Tsuen Wan District
- District: Tsuen Wan
- Legislative Council constituency: New Territories South West
- Population: 19,600 (2019)
- Electorate: 10,131 (2019)

Current constituency
- Created: 2015
- Number of members: One
- Member: Vacant
- Created from: Tsuen Wan Rural East; Tsuen Wan Rural West

Tsuen Wan Rural (Chinese: 荃灣郊區) is one of the 18 constituencies in the Tsuen Wan District of Hong Kong which was created in 2015.

The constituency loosely covers the Tsing Lung Tau area with an estimated population of 19,600.

== Councillors represented ==
Election	Member	Party
2015	Ng Hin-lung→Vacant	Nonpartisan

== Election results ==
=== 2010s ===
Tsuen Wan District Council Election, 2019: Tsuen Wan Rural
Party	Candidate	Votes	%	±%
Independent	Norris Ng Hin-lung	3,409	44.36	−7.94
Deliberation TW	Tam Pui-yan	3,054	39.74	
Nonpartisan	Kwan San-wai	1,221	15.89	
Majority		355	4.62	
Turnout		7,705	76.07	
Independent hold		Swing		

Tsuen Wan District Council Election, 2015: Tsuen Wan Rural
Party	Candidate	Votes	%	±%
Nonpartisan	Ng Hin-lung	1,984	52.3	
Nonpartisan	Chan Wai-ming	1,812	47.7	
Majority		172	4.6	
Turnout		3,840	45.9	
Nonpartisan win (new seat)				
