= Tak Wah (constituency) =

- Elected constituency for the Tsuen Wan District Council
- Boundary of Tak Wah in Tsuen Wan District
- District: Tsuen Wan
- Legislative Council constituency: New Territories South West
- Population: 15,475 (2019)
- Electorate: 5,997 (2019)

Current constituency
- Created: 1994
- Number of members: One
- Member: Vacant

Tak Wah (Chinese: 德華) is one of the 19 constituencies in the Tsuen Wan District.

The constituency returns one district councillor to the Tsuen Wan District Council, with an election every four years.

Tak Wah constituency has estimated population of 15,475.

== Councillors represented ==
Election	Member	Party
1994	Kwong Kwok-chuen	Democratic
2007	Lo Siu-kit	Independent
2019	Jackson Lau→Vacant	Deliberation Tsuen Wan

== Election results ==
=== 2010s ===
Tsuen Wan District Council Election, 2019: Tsk Wah
Party	Candidate	Votes	%	±%
Deliberation TW	Jackson Lau	1,964	52.80	
Nonpartisan	Lo Siu-kit	1,756	47.20	
Majority		208	5.60	
Turnout		3,729	62.21	
Deliberation TW gain from Nonpartisan		Swing		
