= 2021 in politics =

These are some of the notable events relating to politics in 2021.

== January ==
- January 1
  - All works published in 1925, except for some sound recordings, are now in the public domain in the United States.
- January 6
  - 53 Hong Kong pro-democracy activists, former legislators, social workers and academics were arrested by the National Security Department of the Hong Kong Police Force under the national security law over their organisation and participation in the primaries for the subsequently postponed Legislative Council election, including six organisers and 47 participants, making it the largest crackdown under the national security law since its passage on 30 June 2020. The police also raided 72 places including the home of jailed activist Joshua Wong, the offices of news outlets Apple Daily, Stand News and InMedia HK and polling institute Hong Kong Public Opinion Research Institute (PORI), and froze more than $200,000 in funds related to the primaries. These were the most prominent politicians in the opposition camp that had been arrested by the authorities.
  - On January 6, 2021, the United States Capitol Building in Washington, D.C., was attacked by a mob of supporters of then-president Donald Trump in an attempted self-coup d'état, two months after his defeat in the 2020 presidential election. They sought to keep him in power by preventing a joint session of Congress from counting the Electoral College votes to formalize the victory of President-elect Joe Biden. The attack was ultimately unsuccessful in preventing the certification of the election results. According to the bipartisan House select committee that investigated the incident, the attack was the culmination of a seven-part plan by Trump to overturn the election. Within 36 hours, five people died: one was shot by Capitol Police, another died of a drug overdose, and three died of natural causes, including a police officer who died of natural causes a day after being assaulted by rioters. Many people were injured, including 174 police officers. Four officers who responded to the attack died by suicide within seven months. Damage caused by attackers exceeded $2.7 million.
- January 10
  - Kim Jong Un was elected as the General Secretary of the ruling Workers' Party of Korea, inheriting the most senior title in North Korea from his father Kim Jong Il, who died in 2011.
- January 15
  - The Lao People's Revolutionary Party elected Thongloun Sisoulith as its new General Secretary, replacing retiring supreme leader Bounnhang Vorachith. Sisoulith was elected for a five-year term as top leader in Laos.
- January 31
  - Nguyễn Phú Trọng was re-elected for a third five-year term as the General Secretary of the Communist Party of Vietnam, making him the third supreme leader of Vietnam to secure a third term (after Hồ Chí Minh and Lê Duẩn).

== March ==
- March 11
  - The 2021 Hong Kong electoral changes were initiated by the National People's Congress (NPC) on 11 March 2021 to "amend electoral rules and improve the electoral system" of the Hong Kong Special Administrative Region (HKSAR) for its Chief Executive (CE) and the Legislative Council (LegCo), in order to ensure a system in which only "patriots", according to the Chinese definition, govern Hong Kong. The reforms have been widely criticized for their negative impact on the democratic representation in the Hong Kong legislature.

== April ==
- April 9 - Ouhoumoudou Mahamadou's government is formed in Niger.
- April 19 - Miguel Díaz-Canel succeeded Raúl Castro as First Secretary of the Cuban Communist Party, ending more than 62 years of rule by the Castro brothers in Cuba.

== October ==
- October 11
  - Deputy Chairman of the Security Council of Russia Dmitry Medvedev published an article on Kommersant, in which he argued that Ukraine was a "vassal" of the West and that, therefore, it was pointless for the Russian Federation to attempt to dialogue with the Ukrainian authorities, whom he described as "weak", "ignorant" and "unreliable". The Kremlin later specified that Medvedev's article "runs in unison" with Russia's view of the current Ukrainian government.

== November ==
- November 12
  - the Russian Defense Ministry described the deployment of the U.S. warships to the Black Sea as a "threat to regional security and strategic stability." The ministry said in a statement, "The real goal behind the U.S. activities in the Black Sea region is exploring the theatre of operations in case Kyiv attempts to settle the conflict in the southeast by force."
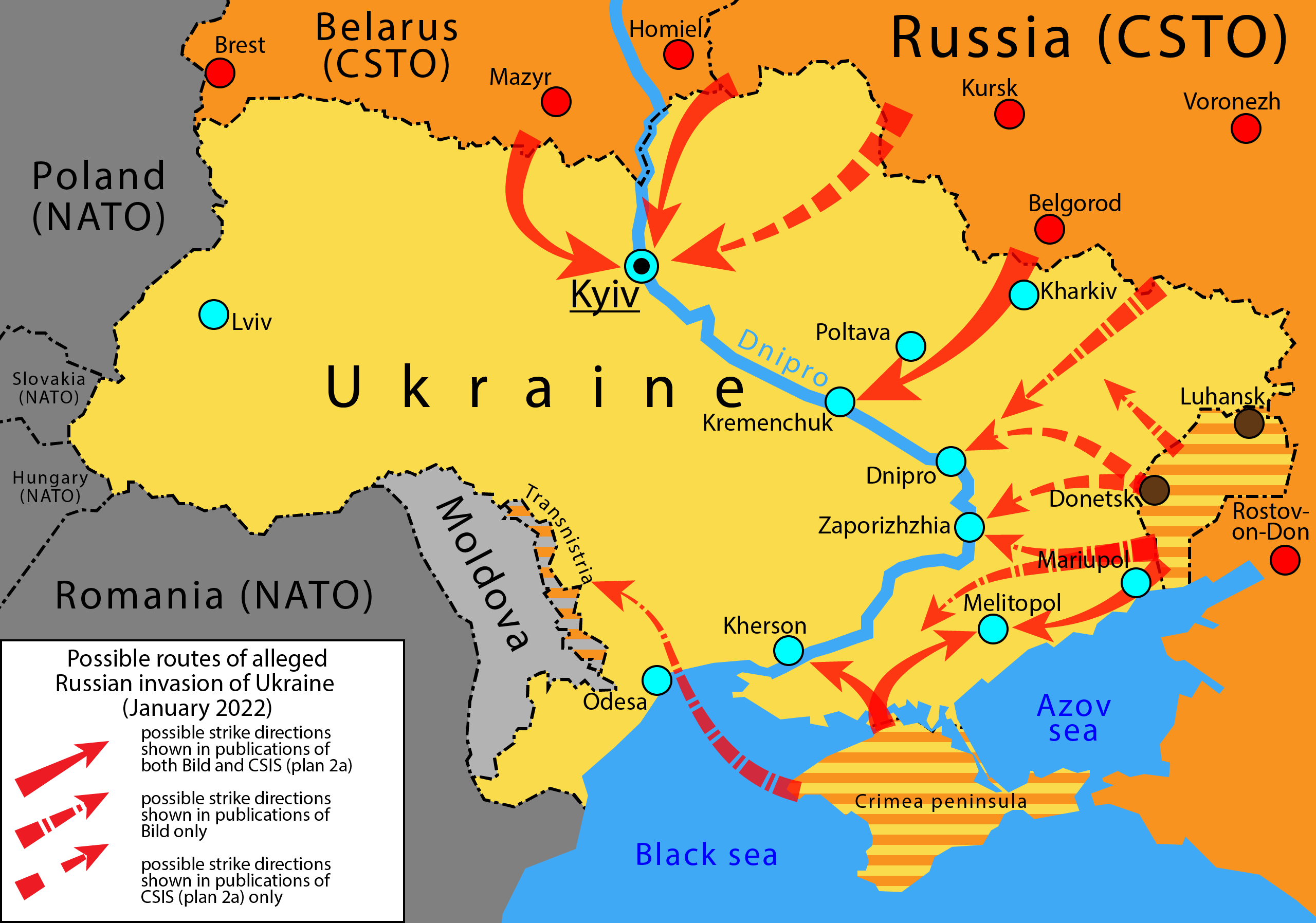
    Map showing two alleged Russian plans published separately by Bild and Center for Strategic and International Studies.
- November 13
  - On 13 November 2021, Ukrainian President Volodymyr Zelenskyy announced that Russia has again amassed 100,000 troops in the border area, higher than the U.S. assessment of about 70,000. In early November, reports of Russian military buildups prompted U.S. officials to warn the EU that Russia could be planning a potential invasion of Ukraine.
- November 21
  - The head of the Chief Directorate of Intelligence of the Ministry of Defence of Ukraine, Kyrylo Budanov, said that Russia had concentrated more than 92,000 troops and Iskander short-range ballistic missile systems near the Ukrainian borders. Budanov said that Russia was behind the protests against vaccination against COVID-19 in Kyiv and other protest rallies in Ukraine to destabilize Ukraine and prepare for a large-scale military invasion. According to Budanov, active actions should be expected in late January – early February 2022.
- November 30
  - Raeesah Khan resigns as Singaporean Member of Parliament, On 26 November, the Office of the Clerk of Parliament announced that the COP had started working on the complaint against her. precipitating a series of lawsuits and court trials that would last until December 2025.

== December ==
- December 1
  - Russia accused Ukraine of deploying half its army – about 125,000 troops – in Donbas to confront pro-Russian separatists. In November and December 2021, Kremlin officials claimed that Ukraine had violated the Minsk peace agreements. Kremlin spokesman Dmitry Peskov denied any "unusual military activity" or a possible invasion of Ukraine, accused Ukraine of "planning aggressive actions against Donbas" and urged NATO to stop "concentrating a military fist" near Russia's borders and arming Ukraine with modern weapons. Putin criticized Ukraine for using Turkish-made Bayraktar TB2 drones against pro-Russian separatists in Donbas. Russia accused Ukraine of moving heavy artillery towards the front line where separatists are fighting with Ukrainian forces, and accused Ukraine of taking "provocations."
- 3 December
  - Minister of Defense of Ukraine Oleksii Reznikov, speaking to the deputies of the Verkhovna Rada (Ukraine's national parliament), said: "There is a possibility of a large-scale escalation on the part of Russia. The most likely time to achieve readiness for escalation will be the end of January." In early December 2021, Janes analysis concluded that major elements of the Russian 41st Army (headquartered at Novosibirsk) and the 1st Guards Tank Army (normally deployed around Moscow) had been repositioned to the west, reinforcing the Russian 20th Guards and 8th Guards armies already positioned closer to the Ukrainian border. Additional Russian forces were reported to have moved into Crimea reinforcing Russian naval and ground units already deployed there.
- December 8
  - U.S. intelligence officials warned in December 2021 that Russia was planning a major military offensive into Ukraine in January 2022.
- December 19
  - The 2021 Hong Kong Legislative Council election was a general election held on 19 December 2021 for the 7th Legislative Council of Hong Kong. Under the drastic Beijing-imposed electoral overhaul, the total number of seats was increased from 70 to 90 seats, with the directly elected geographical constituencies (GCs) reduced from 35 to 20 seats, the trade-based indirectly elected functional constituencies (FCs) staying at 30, and the additional 40 seats being elected by the 1,500-member Election Committee.
- December 21
  - On 29 December 2021, Stand News, one of the few remaining pro-democracy media outlets in Hong Kong following the passage of the Hong Kong national security law in 2020, was raided by the National Security Department of the Hong Kong Police Force. Media executives and journalists were arrested on the charge of "conspiring to publish seditious publications" on a large scale. As a result of the raid, Stand News ceased operations, the organisation's website and social media became inactive, and all its employees were dismissed. The Office of the United Nations High Commissioner for Human Rights, along with leaders in Canada, Germany, the United Kingdom and United States, condemned the raid.
- December 24
  - Former President of South Korea Park Geun-hye was pardoned on compassionate grounds by incumbent president Moon Jae-in and was released from her 25-year imprisonment a week later. Park was previously sentenced in April 2018 following her 2017 impeachment over abuse of power and coercion amidst a political scandal.

== See also ==
- List of elections in 2021
