= Wong Kam-fai =

Chinese computer scientist

Professor the Honourable Wong Kam-fai MH
- 黃錦輝
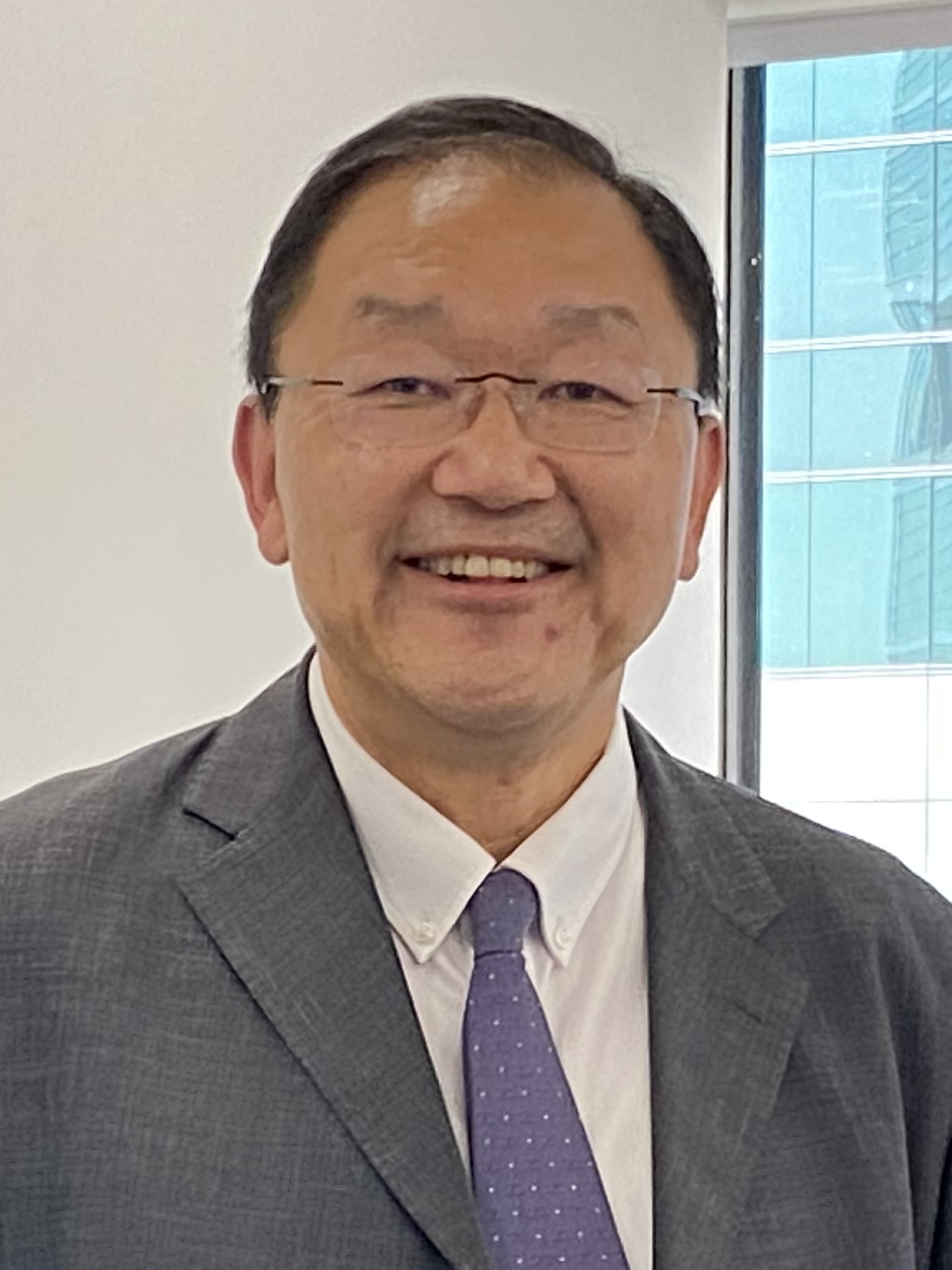
- Wong in 2023

Member of the Legislative Council
- In office 19 December 2022 – 3 July 2026
- Preceded by: Nelson Lam
- Constituency: Election Committee

Personal details
- Born: 1960 (age 65–66)
- Education: University of Edinburgh
- Occupation: Computer scientist

William Wong Kam-fai MH (Chinese: 黃錦輝; born 1960) is a Hong Kong computer scientist. He is a professor of engineering at the Chinese University of Hong Kong and a former member of the Legislative Council for Election Committee constituency.

== Academic career ==
After earning a Bachelor of Science and PhD in Electrical Engineering from the University of Edinburgh in 1987, Wong worked in the United Kingdom and Germany, including as a researcher at Unisys, the Erlangen Center for Interface Research and Catalysis, European Computer-Industry Research Centre, and Heriot-Watt University. After returning to Hong Kong in 1993, Wong began his research work in Chinese language databases and artificial intelligence. Having worked in the field of natural language processing as well as Chinese language information processing, Wong was invited by Charles K. Kao, then Vice-Chancellor of the Chinese University of Hong Kong (CUHK), to join the new Faculty of Engineering and lead the research project on Chinese Language Databases. He subsequently became a professor in the faculty, the Associate Dean (External Affairs) of Engineering, and the director of the Center of Innovation and Technology.

Wong published "The Information Mind of the e-Society" in 2008, and "Soft Power in Innovation and Technology: Competition and Cultural Thinking in Hong Kong's New Era" in 2016. He also contributed to the "Introduction to Chinese Natural Language Processing" in 2018.

== Political career ==
Wong is a Hong Kong member of National Committee of the Chinese People's Political Consultative Conference (CPPCC). In December 2022, he was elected to the Legislative Council of Hong Kong through the Election Committee constituency with 983 votes. He was discovered to have failed in submitting the election forms of political endorsement in time, and misread the oath of office.

Wong was arrested on 29 June 2026 for four offences including drink driving and hit-and-run. Wong was reported to have hit two parked cars outside a residential hall on the CUHK campus, and drove away from the accident before returning. He was apprehended at the scene after failing the breath test, and later released on bail. Wong did not disclose the arrest to the legislature nor the public until the arrest was reported by the press on 1 July. Wong, who appeared joyful at Hong Kong's handover ceremony that day, confirmed the incident on social media. He was criticised for committing a much more serious offence than another pro-Beijing lawmaker Judy Chan, who was fined after driving against the flow of traffic, as well as damaging legislature's credibility for concealing the scandal and not setting a good example. Wong was also found to have proposed using artificial intelligence to combat drink-driving more effectively in a newspaper piece in 2024, and was believed to have been convicted of drink driving in 2015.

Wong resigned from the Legislative Council on 3 July, in order to "avoid impacting the operation" of the legislature. In the statement he also apologised to the legislature and public for the distress caused. He became the first MP to resign over scandal in 26 years. CUHK suspended him from administrative duties on the same day. He is expected to leave the CPPCC when the term ends in 2028.

== Honours ==
He was awarded the Medal of Honour (MH) by the Hong Kong government in 2011 for his contribution in IT development in Hong Kong.

Legislative Council of Hong Kong
Preceded by Nelson Lam	Member of Legislative Council; Representative for Election Committee; 2022–2026	Vacant
