= 2022 President of the Hong Kong Legislative Council election =

Election for the President of the Seventh Legislative Council
- 10 January 2022
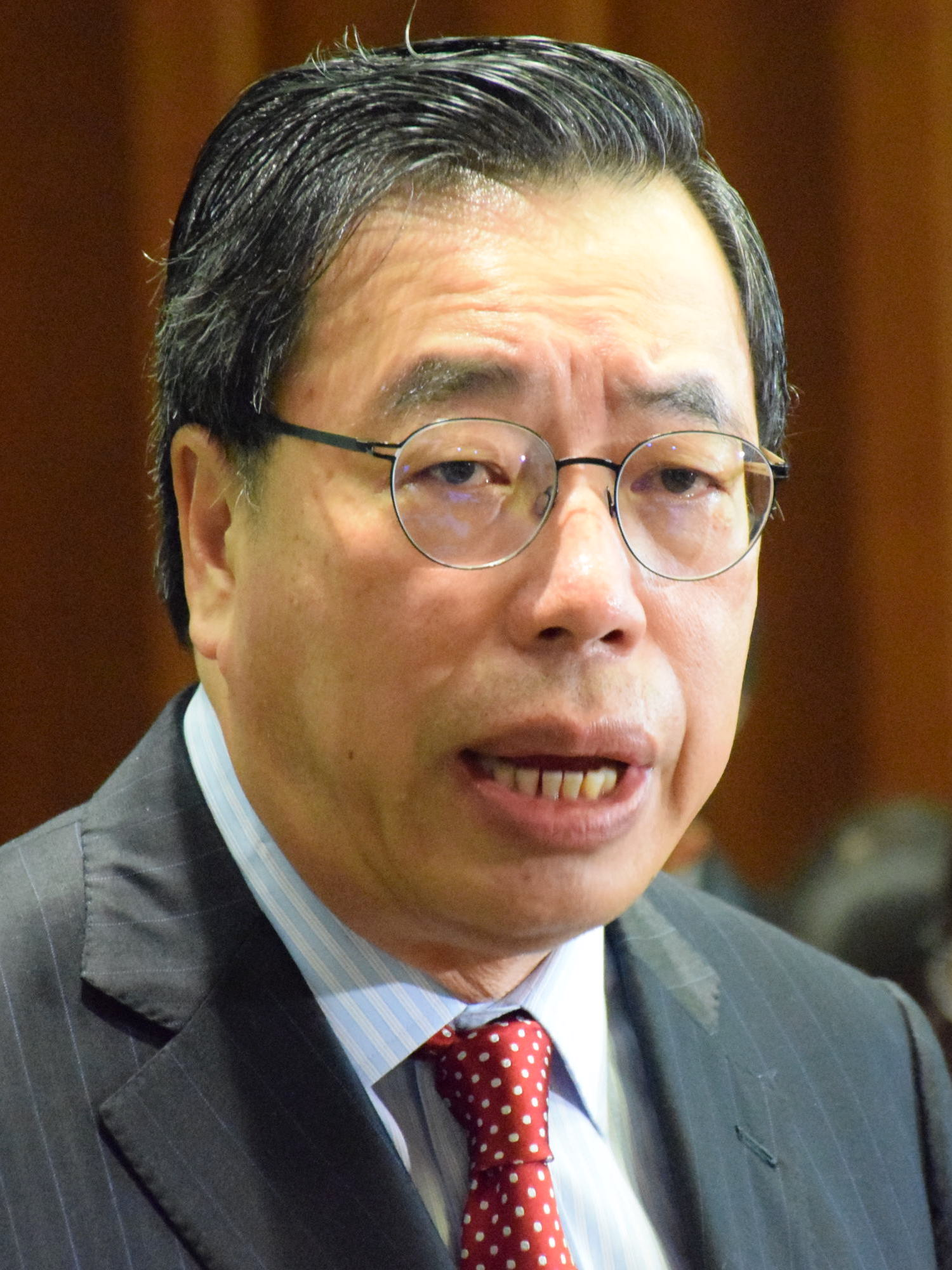
	Majority party
Candidate	Andrew Leung
Party	BPA
Constituency	Industrial (First)
Ballots in favour	Unopposed
President before election
Andrew Leung
BPA
Elected President
Andrew Leung
BPA

The election for the President of the Seventh Legislative Council took place on 10 January 2022 for members of the 7th Legislative Council of Hong Kong to among themselves elect the President of the Legislative Council of Hong Kong for the duration of the council.

== Procedures ==
Schedule 1 of the Rules of Procedure of the Legislative Council stipulates the procedures of the election for president. The Clerk to the Legislative Council will prepare a list of all the nominations in the order of receipt and distribute to all members at least 2 clear days before the day of the election. Before the election, candidates will be able to present their manifesto and answer questions in a special forum.

The secretariat announced that the deadline for nomination is on 4 January 2022 while the election will take place on 10 January. As only one nomination was received at deadline, Andrew Leung was declared duly elected.

== Candidates ==
According to Article 71 of the Hong Kong Basic Law and Rule 4 of the Rules of Procedure of the Legislative Council, the President of the Legislative Council has to be a Chinese citizen of 40 years old or above, a permanent resident of Hong Kong with no right of abode in any foreign country, and has ordinarily resided in Hong Kong for not less than 20 years continuously.

=== Valid nomination ===
Candidate	Party affiliation	Political camp	Born	Political office	Notes
Andrew Leung; GBM GBS MBE JP	BPA	Pro-Beijing	24 February 1951 (age 70); Hong Kong	President of the Sixth Legislative Council (2016-2021); Member of Legislative Council for Industrial (First) (since 2004); Chairman (Hon) of the BPA (since 2016); Chairman of the BPA (2012-2016)	

== Results ==
Candidate	Ballots in favour	
Candidate	Votes	%
Andrew Leung ✓	Uncontested	
Spoilt/rejected ballots	—N/a	
Turnout	—N/a	
