= List of secretaries general of the Legislative Council of Hong Kong =

Secretary General of the Legislative Council of Hong Kong
- Incumbent; Dora Wai since 1 August 2024
- Type: Clerk
- Appointer: Legislative Council Commission
- Deputy: Deputy Secretary General

The Secretary General of the Secretariat of the Legislative Council of Hong Kong, formerly called the Clerk to the Legislative Council of Hong Kong before 1995, is the head and chief executive of the Secretariat of the Legislative Council of Hong Kong, and is responsible for managing LegCo's facilities and services and supporting its work. As Clerk to the Legislative Council, the Secretary General is the principal adviser to the President of the Council on parliamentary procedure. The clerk's other responsibilities relate to the conduct of business of the Legislature and its committees. Many other officers and personnel provide assistance to the clerk. In addition, the Secretary General is the Controlling Officer of public money appropriated for Legislative Council Commission’s performance of its functions, and is responsible for administering a remuneration and operating expenses reimbursement system for Members of the Council.

== List ==
Past secretaries general of the Legislative Council of Hong Kong:

- Mr. J. Stewart-Lockhart: 1884–1885 (acting)
- Arathoon Seth: 1885–1889, 1893
- J. M. Gutierrez: 1887 (acting)
- Mr. F. A. Hazeland: 1890 (acting)
- Mr. Alexander MacDonald Thomson: 1891–1892 (acting)
- Mr. John Gerald Thomas Buckle: 1894–1896 (acting), 1897, 1898–1903
- Captain Francis Joseph Badeley: 1896 (acting)
- Mr. Reginald Fleming Johnston: 1899–1903, 1904 (acting)
- Mr. Arthur George Murchison Fletcher: 1905–1908, 1912–1913, 1915–1917, 1920–1923, 1925
- Mr. Cecil Clementi: 1908, 1913 (acting)
- Mr. R. H. Crofton: 1911, 1913
- Mr. Michael James Breen: 1914
- Mr. Arthur Dyer Ball: 1918, 1922
- Mr. J. A. E. Bullock: 1919
- Mr. William James Carrie: 1920
- Mr. Samuel Burnside Boyd McElderry: 1920, 1923, 1924–26
- Mr. David William Tratman: 1927
- Mr. Norman Lockhart Smith: 1931
- Mr. Geoffery Cadzow Hamilton: 1949, 1950, 1952
- Mr. David Ronald Holmes MBE MC: 1953
- Mr. Donald Collin Cumyn Luddington: 1956–1957
- Mr. Roderick John Frampton: 1970–1972
- Mr. Kenneth Harry Wheeler: 1973–1976
- Mrs. Lolly Tse Chiu Yuen-chu: 1975–1977
- Mr. Stephen Tam Shu-pui: 1978–1979
- Mrs. Lorna Leung Tsui Lai-man: 1978–1982
- Mrs. Jennie Chok Pang Yuen-yee: 1982–1986
- Mr. Li Wing: 1984–1985
- Mr. Law Kam-sang: 1986–1992
- Mr. Cletus Lau Kwok-hong: 1992–1994
- Mr. Ricky Fung Choi-cheung JP: 1994–2008
- Ms. Pauline Ng Man-wah SBS: 2008–2012
- Mr. Kenneth Chen Wei-on SBS: 2012–2024
- Ms Dora Wai: 2024-present
