= Chan Wing-kwong =

Professor the Honourable Chan Wing-kwong
- 陳永光
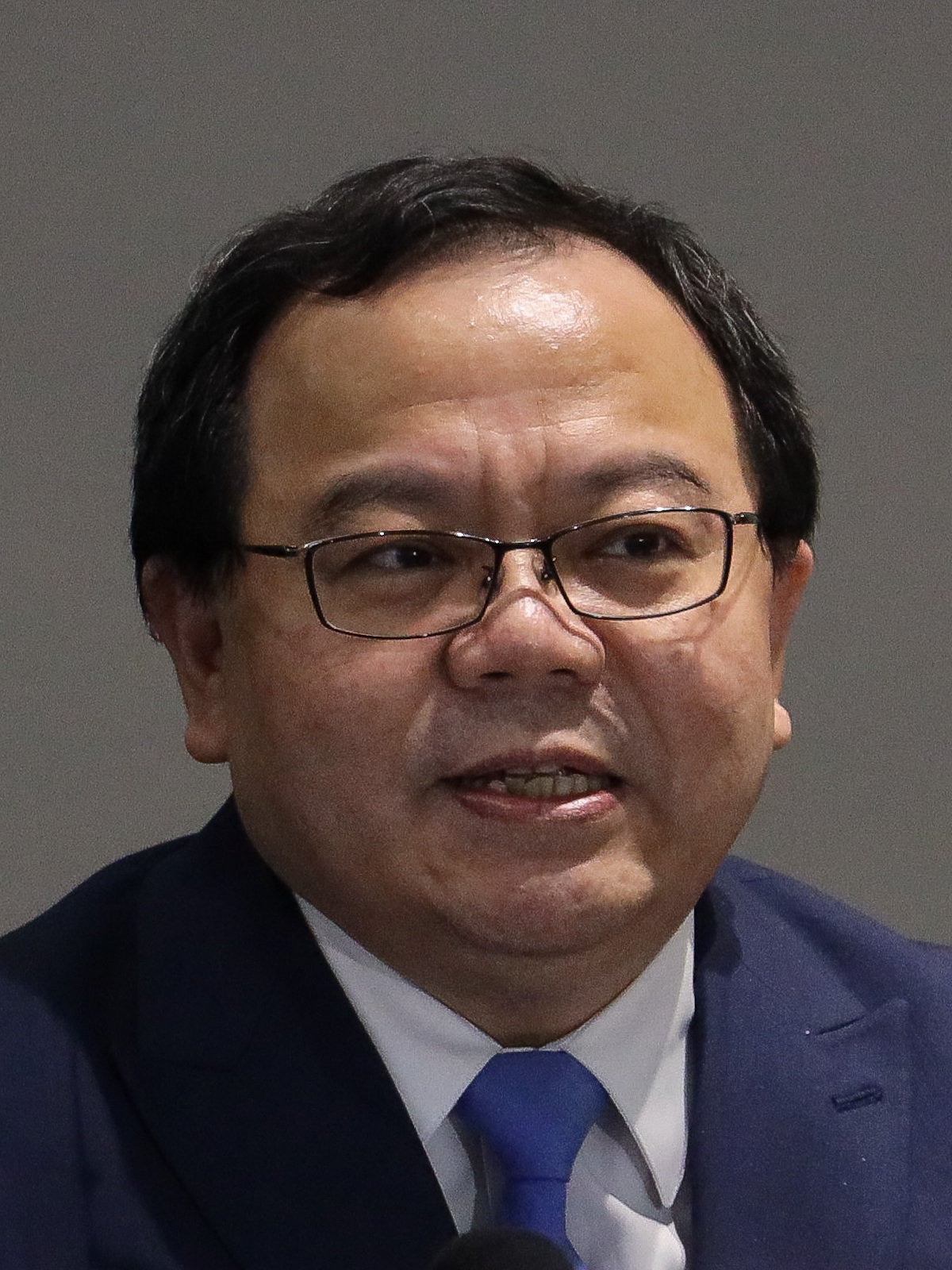
- Chan in 2023

Member of the Legislative Council
- Incumbent
- Assumed office 19 December 2022
- Preceded by: Horace Cheung
- Constituency: Election Committee

Personal details
- Born: 1963 (age 62–63)
- Party: Democratic Alliance for the Betterment and Progress of Hong Kong (DAB)
- Education: Hong Kong Baptist University; Guangzhou University of Chinese Medicine

Professor Chan Wing-kwong (Chinese: 陳永光; born 1963) is a traditional Chinese medicine practitioner, professor and a member of the Legislative Council of Hong Kong for Election Committee constituency.

== Biography ==
Chan was graduated from Hong Kong Baptist University with a bachelor's degree and a master's degree in Chinese Medicine and obtained a doctoral degree in Chinese Medicine from the Guangzhou University of Chinese Medicine.

Chan became a professor and a councillor of the Hong Kong Institute of Education in 2004 and Baptist University in 2016. He was also a member of the Chinese Medicine Practitioners Board and the Chinese Medicine Council of Hong Kong and president of Hong Kong Registered Chinese Medicine Practitioner Association

Chan first became member of the Election Committee in 1998 through the Chinese Medicine subsector and again in 2006.

Chan ran unsuccessfully in the 2021 Legislative Council election against David Lam Tzit-yuen in Medical and Health Services constituency, but was elected to the Legislative Council of Hong Kong through Election Committee constituency in the 18 December 2022 by-election with 1,028 votes.

Legislative Council of Hong Kong
Preceded by Horace Cheung	Member of Legislative Council; Representative for Election Committee; 2022–present	Incumbent
