= Shang Hailong =

Hong Kong politician (born 1982)

The Honourable Shang Hailong
- 尚海龍
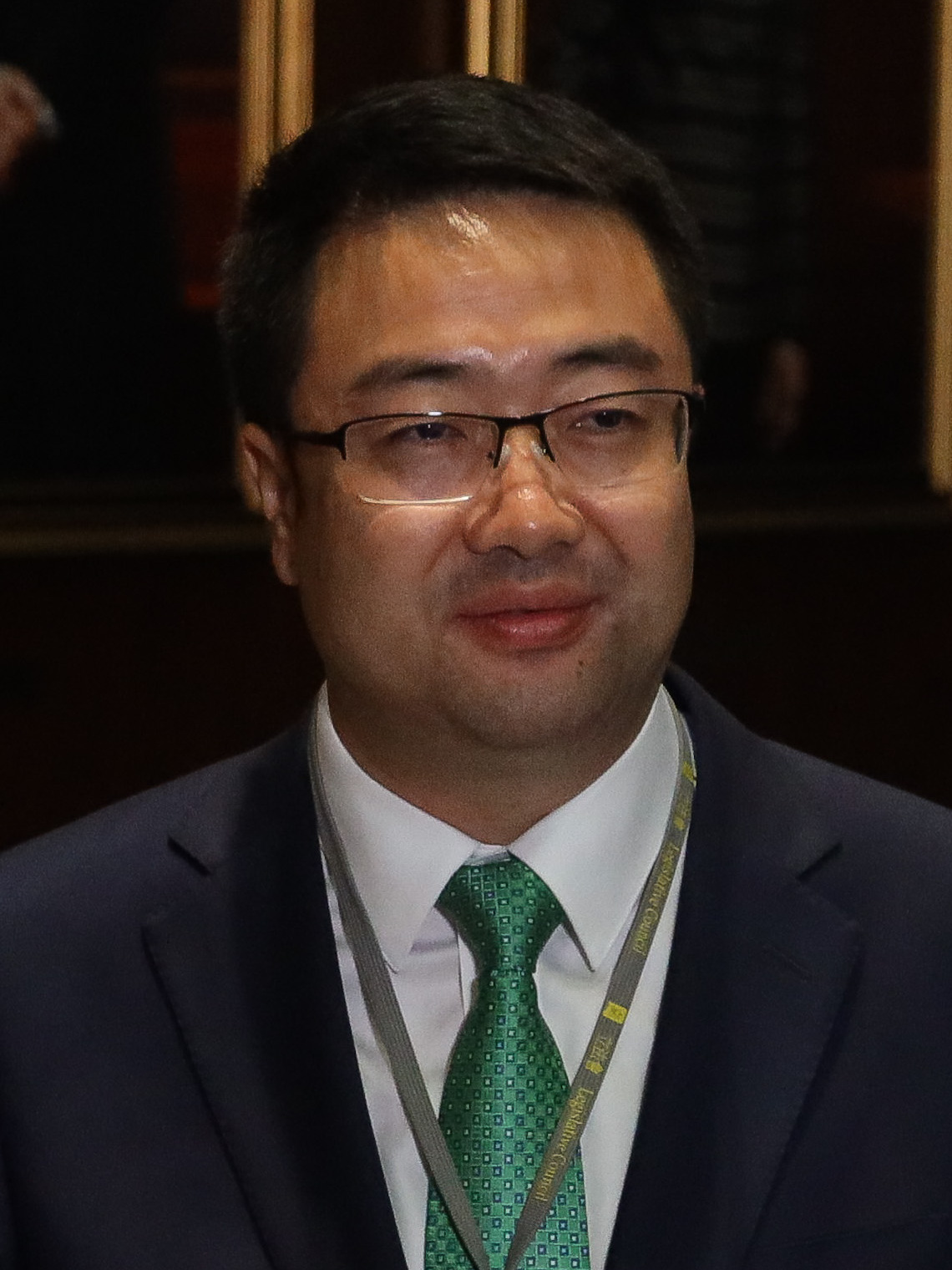
- Shang in 2023

Member of the Legislative Council
- In office 19 December 2022 – 31 December 2025
- Constituency: Election Committee

Personal details
- Born: 1982 (age 43–44) Shaanxi Province, China
- Education: Tsinghua University

Jesse Shang Hailong (Chinese: 尚海龍; born 1982) is a Hong Kong politician and former member of the Legislative Council of Hong Kong for Election Committee constituency. He is a strategic consultant of SenseTime, an artificial intelligence company, and a company consultant of China Mobile Hong Kong Company Limited. He was seen as one of the gangpiao leaders in the legislature, and had been focusing on the works related to the Top Talent Pass Scheme which attracted mainland Chinese to move to take residence in Hong Kong.

== Biography ==
Shang was born in Shaanxi and grew up with his father in Qinghai. He worked in China Mobile after graduation. Shang joined the Communist Youth League of China, but did not become a member of the Chinese Communist Party as an adult. He traveled to Hong Kong for the first time in 2006 and settled in Hong Kong through the Admission Scheme for Mainland Talents and Professionals in 2011. He was graduated from Tsinghua University with a Master of Public Administration in 2021.

He was elected to the Legislative Council of Hong Kong through Election Committee constituency in the 18 December 2022 by-election with 812 votes. He chose not to seek another term and left the Legislative Council in October 2025, concluding his three-year term in office.
