= Kenneth Chen =

Kenneth Chen GBS
- 陳維安
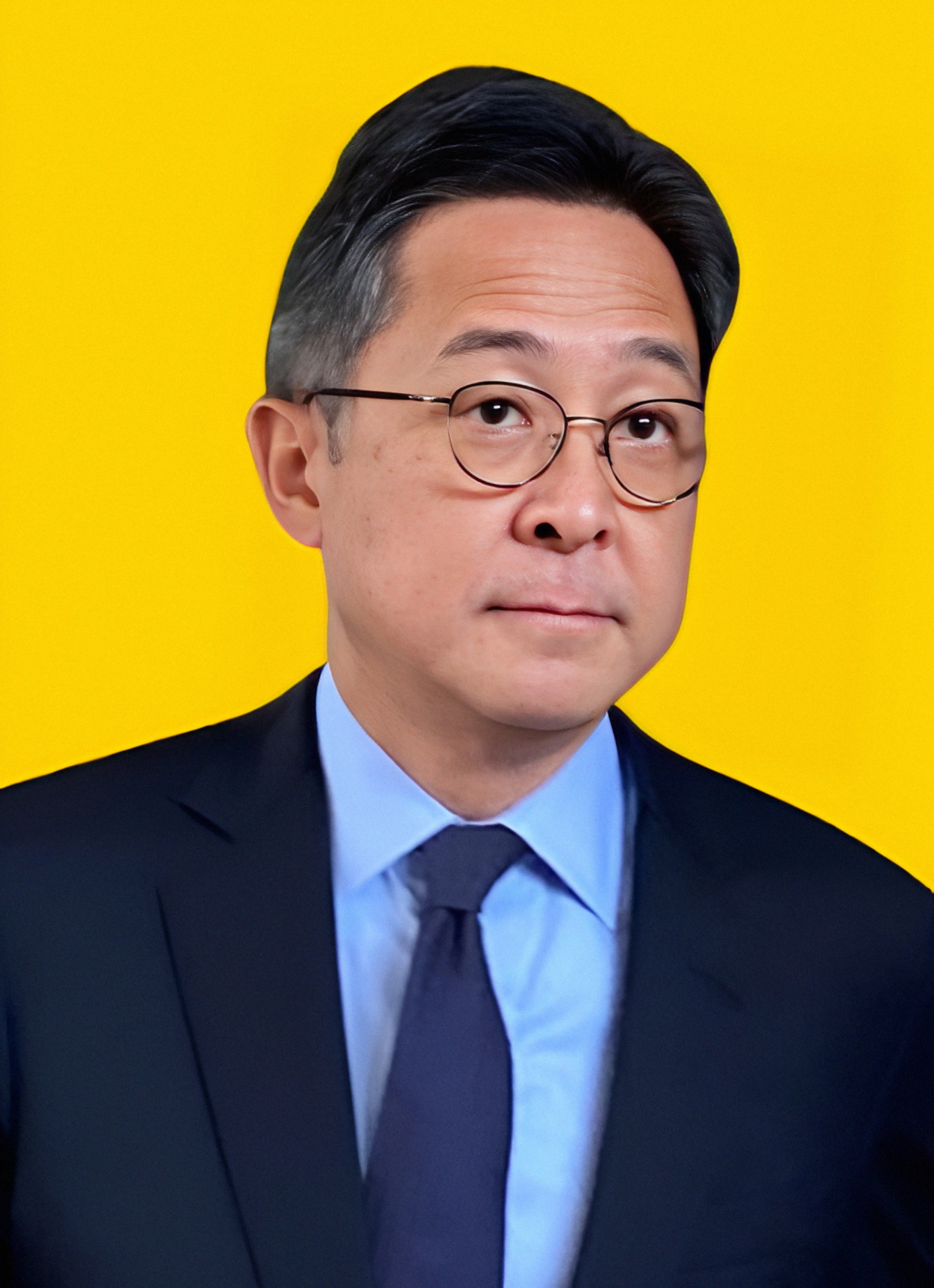
- Chen giving testimony on the storming of the Legislative Council Complex in the West Kowloon Magistrates' Courts in 2023

Secretary General of the Legislative Council of Hong Kong
- In office 29 September 2012 – 31 July 2024
- Preceded by: Pauline Ng Man Wah
- Succeeded by: Dora Wai

Undersecretary for Education
- In office 24 July 2008 - 30 June 2012
- Succeeded by: Kevin Yeung

Personal details
- Born: 1965 (age 60–61) Hong Kong
- Spouse: Maura Wong Hung Hung (Senior Citizen Home Safety Association CEO)
- Education: Diocesan Boys' School
- Alma mater: Princeton University (B.S.); Harvard University (MSc); Wharton School (MBA)

Kenneth Chen Wei-on GBS is a former Hong Kong public servant who served as Secretary General of the Legislative Council of Hong Kong from 2012 to 2024, and Undersecretary for Education from 2008 to 2012. He briefly served as Vice President of the Chinese University of Hong Kong after his retirement from the Legislative Council.

== Education ==
Chen attended Diocesan Boys' School from 1977 to 1982, and holds a Bachelor of Science degree in electrical engineering and computer science from Princeton University (1987), a Master of Science degree in applied mathematics from Harvard University (1988) and an MBA from the Wharton School of the University of Pennsylvania (1992).

== Career ==
=== Early career ===
Chen worked as a management consultant and as a private equity investment manager after graduating. He served as a part-time member of the Central Policy Unit from 1998 until 2000, when he joined the senior management of the Hong Kong Jockey Club, rising to the position of Director of Racecourse Business when he left to join the government in 2008. He was a member of the Advisory Committee on Teacher Education and Qualifications between 2002 and 2008.

=== Undersecretary for Education (2008-2012) ===
In 2008, he was nominated as Undersecretary for the Education Bureau under the Political Appointments System. He chaired a working group to study the development of e-learning resources in Hong Kong. A report was published in October 2009.

=== Secretary-General of the Legislative Council (2012-2024) ===
Chen was appointed secretary-general by the Legislative Council Commission in 2012, a contract non-civil service position. In 2020, his annual salary was reported to be 3.6 million HKD.

In 2019, he was criticised by the pan-democrats for exceeding his powers. On behalf of the Secretariat, he issued a circular to members of the bills committee on Saturday requesting them to vote on whether to replace James To with Abraham Razack as the presiding officer of the committee in question. The pan-democrats believed that he did not follow the convention of allowing members to discuss the matter first. An online petition gathered over 20,000 signatures calling for his resignation.

=== Vice-President (Administration) of the Chinese University of Hong Kong (2024-2025) ===
Chen was appointed vice president of the Chinese University of Hong Kong (CUHK) for a 3-year term in September 2024, succeeding Eric Ng, who was abruptly dismissed for signing a petition that opposed a legislative measure to decrease the size of the university council. The appointment indirectly contributed to a governance crisis at the University of Hong Kong (HKU), where Chen had initially been chosen for a similar role but did not end up being appointed due to HKU president Zhang Xiang failing to secure approval for the proposed annual pay package of more than 5 million HKD.

It was reported in July 2025 that Chen had tendered his resignation as vice president after only 11 months in the role, reportedly because he "did not find the work environment suited him". He is expected to leave office on 16 September 2025.

== Personal life ==
Political offices
New title	Under Secretary for Education; 2008–2012	Succeeded by Kevin Yeung
Legislative Council of Hong Kong
Preceded by Pauline Ng	Secretary General of the Secretariat; 2012–present	Incumbent
