= 2022 Hong Kong Election Committee (constituency) by-election =

2022 Election Committee by-election
- 18 December 2022
- Registered: 1,441
- Turnout: 90.70%
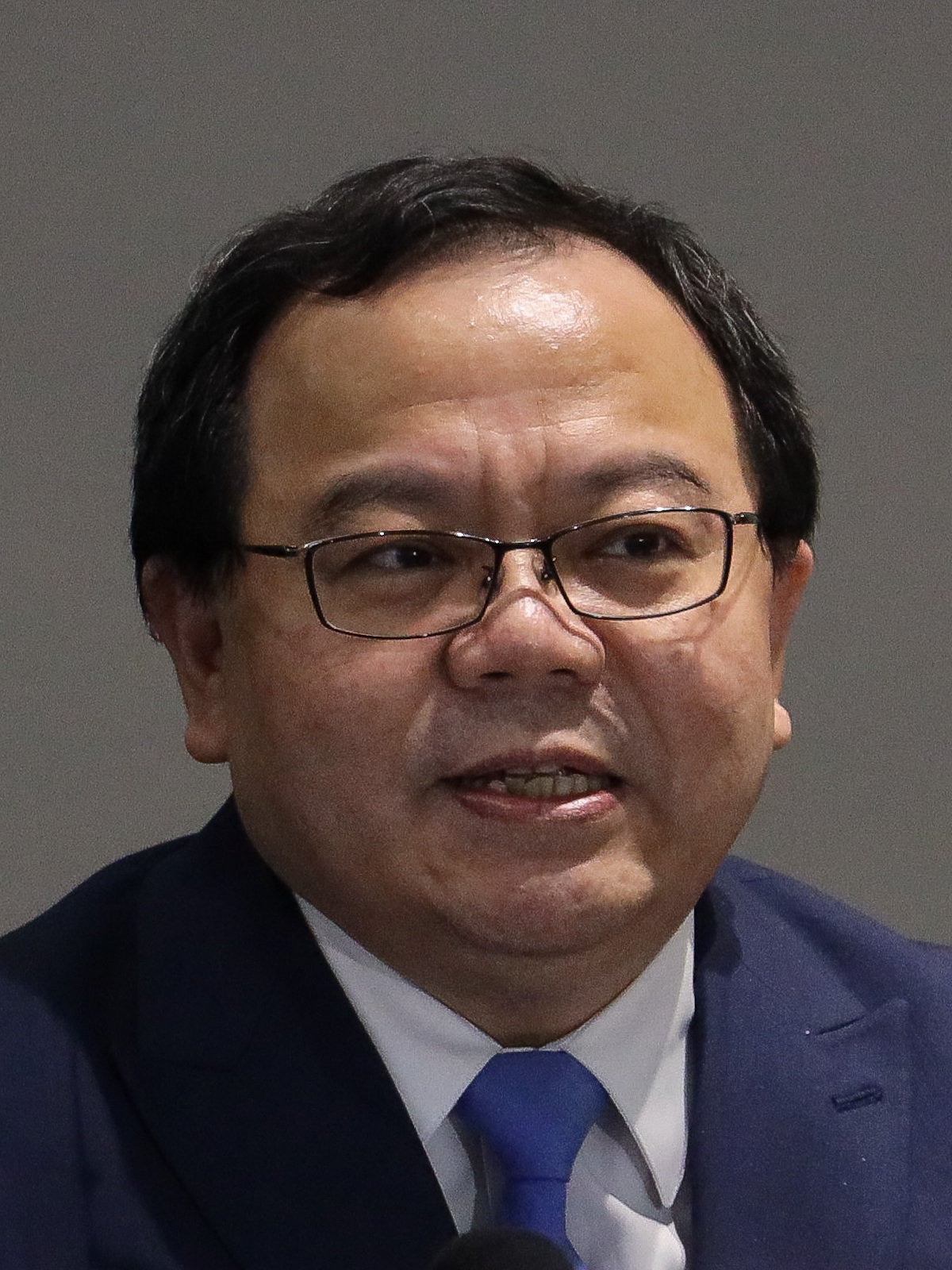

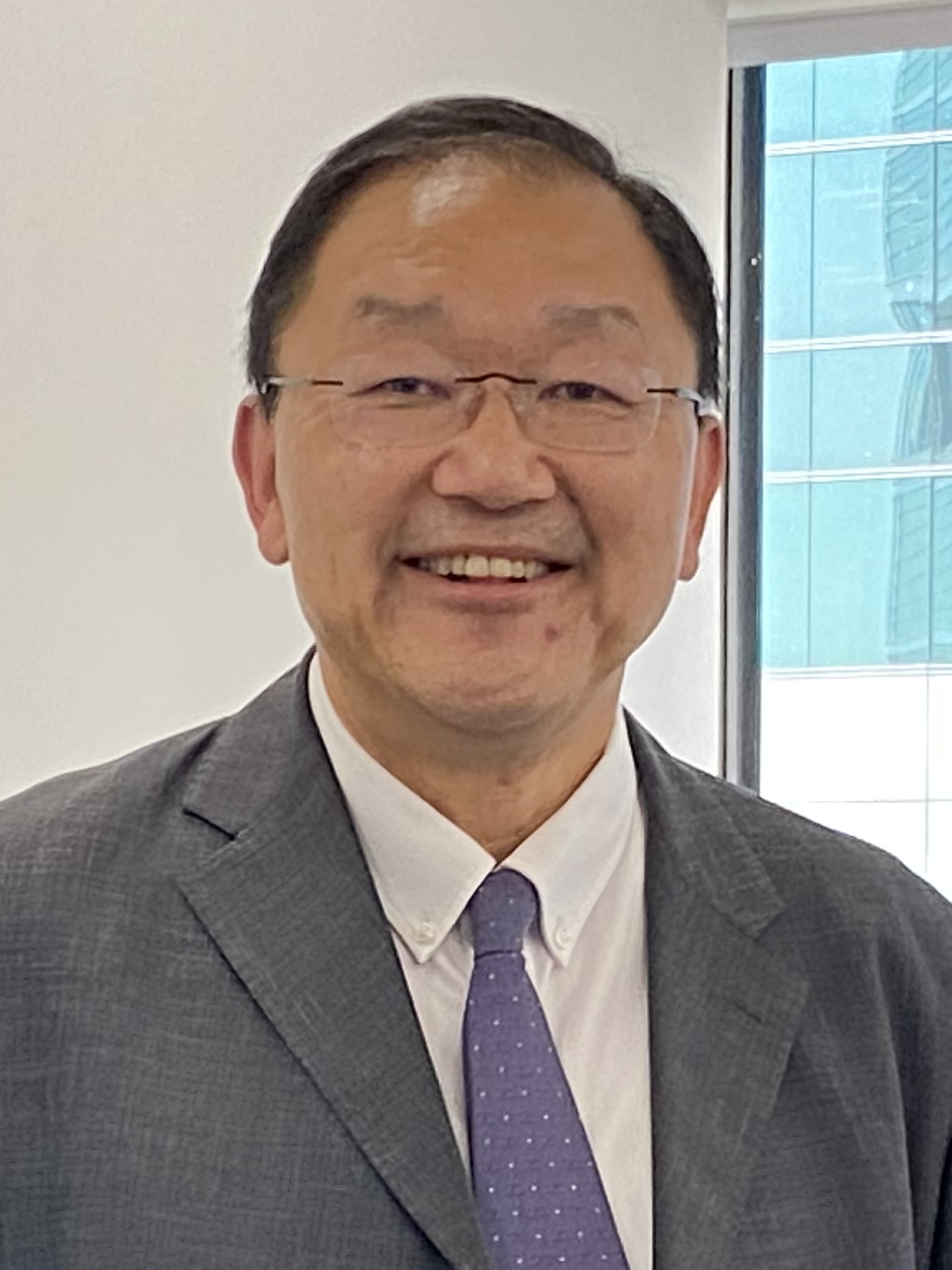

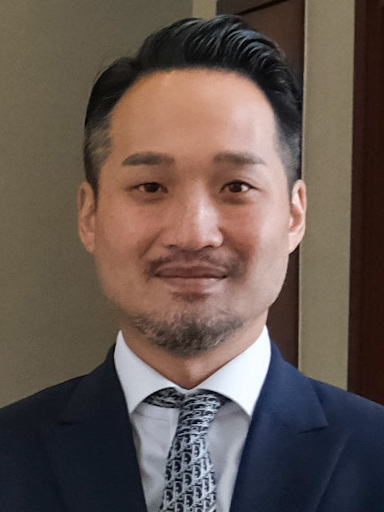

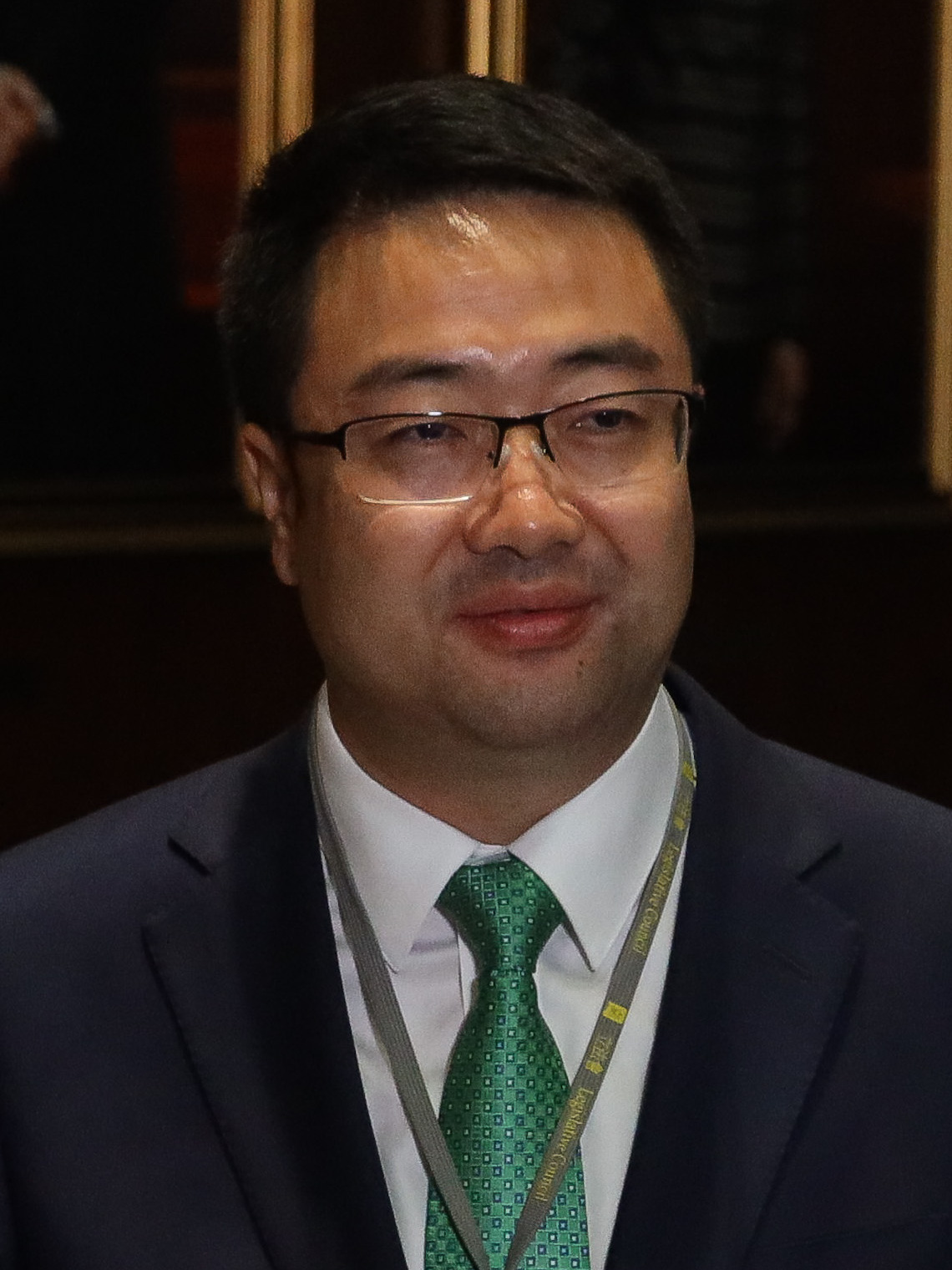

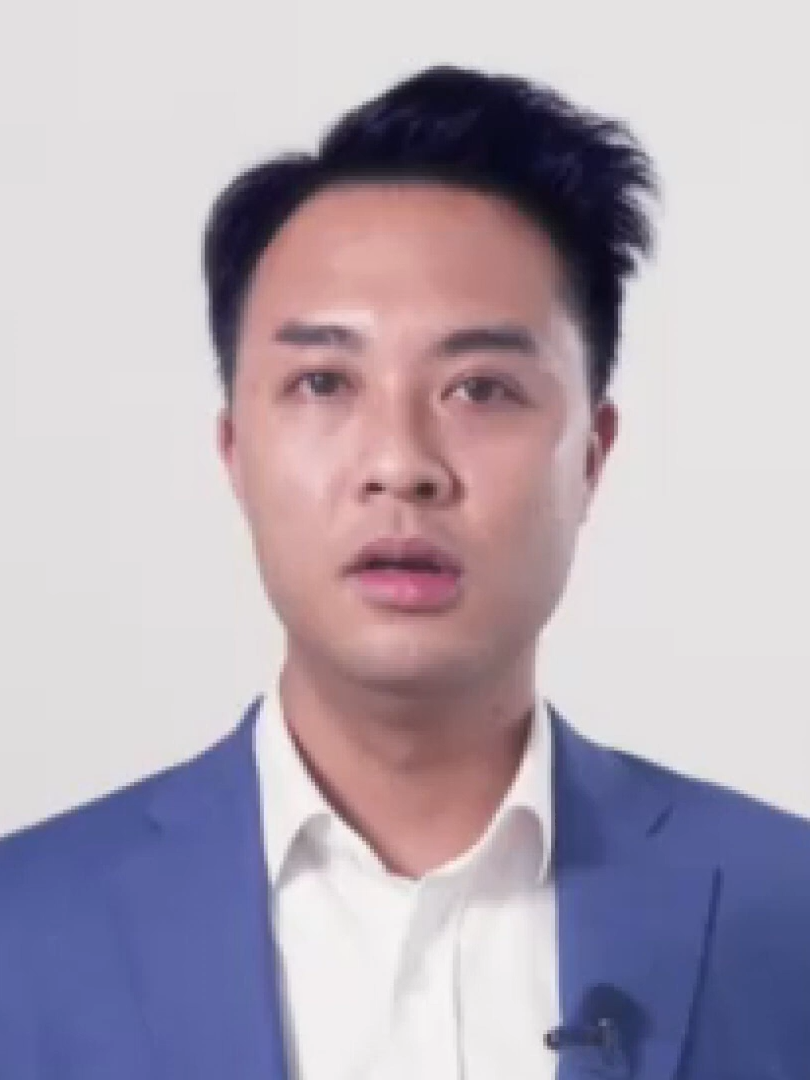

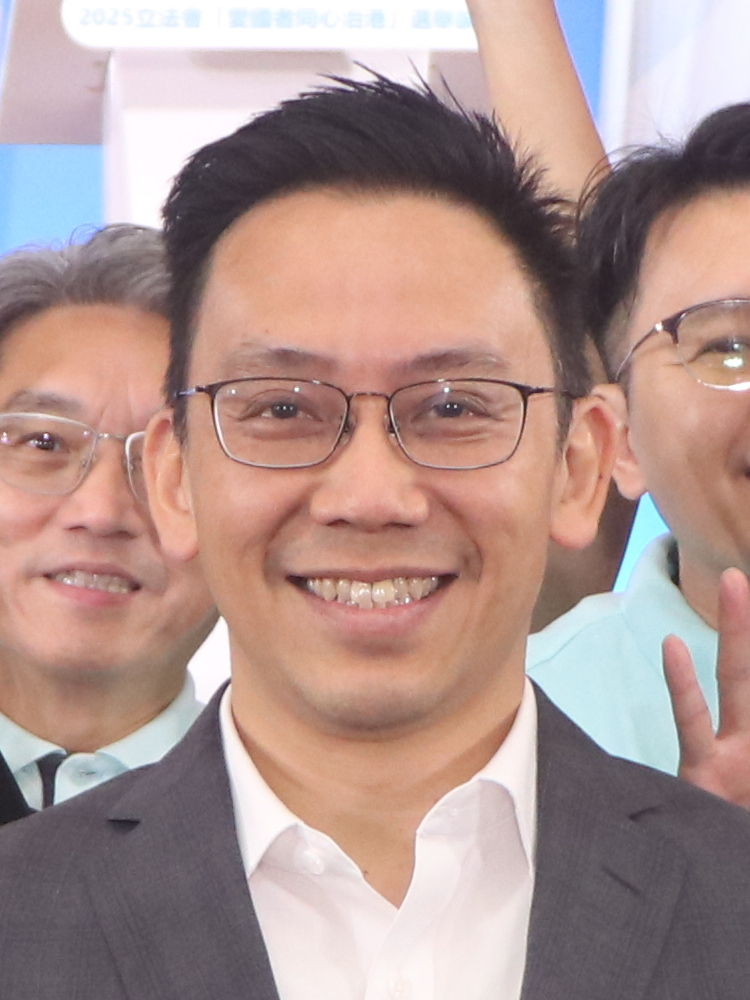
Candidate	Chan Wing-kwong	William Wong	Adrian Ho
Party	DAB	Independent	NPP
Alliance	Pro-Beijing	Pro-Beijing	Pro-Beijing
Electoral vote	1,028	983	833
Percentage	78.65%	75.21%	63.73%
Candidate	Shang Hailong	Gary Wong	Lee Kwong-yu
Party	Independent	Independent	FTU
Alliance	Pro-Beijing	Pro-Beijing	Pro-Beijing
Electoral vote	812	791	781
Percentage	62.13%	60.52%	59.76%
Members before election
Horace Cheung (DAB)
Alice Mak (FTU)
Dong Sun (Ind.)
Nelson Lam (Ind.)
Elected Members
Chan Wing-kwong (DAB)
Adrian Ho (NPP)
Shang Hailong (Ind.)
William Wong (Ind.)

A by-election was held for the Election Committee constituency in the Legislative Council of Hong Kong on 18 December 2022 after resignation of four Legislative Councillors appointed to the new government led by Chief Executive John Lee Ka-chiu.

== Background ==
The four incumbents, Alice Mak, Horace Cheung, Nelson Lam, and Dong Sun resigned on 19 June 2022 after they were appointed as principal officials of the new government led by John Lee.

All four members were elected to the constituency of Election Committee, consisted of around 1,500 members, who were the eligible voters of this by-election. Adopting the 'block vote' voting system, each Election Committee member must elect exactly four candidates, or the ballot paper is regarded as invalid.

== Candidates and campaign ==
During the nomination period from 1 to 14 November 2022, six nominations were received. Despite urge from Tik Chi-yuen, the sole non-establishment member in the Legislative Council, none of the pro-democracy camp or non-establishment camp joined the election as the Election Committee was heavily pro-Beijing.

The six candidates, according to respective candidate number, are –

1. William Wong Kam-fai, Associate Dean (External Affairs) of the Faculty of Engineering of the Chinese University of Hong Kong, CPPCC member;
2. Chan Wing-kwong (DAB), President of Hong Kong Registered Chinese Medicine Practitioner Association;
3. Adrian Pedro Ho King-hong (NPP), founder of pro-Beijing Facebook group Save HK, nephew of former Macau leader Edmund Ho;
4. Gary Wong Chi-him, former member of Path of Democracy, defeated in 2016 and 2021 elections;
5. Shang Hailong, General Manager of SenseTime Hong Kong;
6. Lee Kwong-yu (FTU), Director-General of I.T. People Association of Hong Kong.

Three candidates, Shang, William Wong, and Lee, had experience in technology industry, which media said is in line with the government's priority in technology and innovation.

Both Shang and Wong was alleged to have failed to submit signed consent forms from the supporter mentioned in election advertisements within the legal timeframe, therefore suspected of breaking election regulations. Shang admitted the late submission, while Wong repeatedly denied to comment on the possible penalties.

With a limited electorate base, candidates were said to have done little to engage the public during campaigning.

== Result ==
The result was announced an hour after the conclusion of voting. Chan Wing-kwong received the most votes, succeeding party colleague Horace Cheung. Shang and William Wong were also elected as independents. Lee failed to hold the FTU seat left by Alice Mak, and was the second electoral defeat in four days after the NPC election, which FTU expressed regret. NPP gained one seat and remained the fourth-largest party in the Legislative Council.

Media reported the Chinese Government did not "bless" (or support in secret) any candidates in this election, and the defeat was the show of dismay by the business groups over FTU's staunch pro-labour stance.

Result of the by-election is as follows:

2022 Election Committee by-election
Party	Candidate	Votes	%	±%
DAB	Chan Wing-kwong	1,028	78.65	N/A
Independent	William Wong Kam-fai	983	75.21	N/A
NPP	Adrian Pedro Ho King-hong	833	63.73	N/A
Independent	Shang Hailong	812	62.13	N/A
Independent	Gary Wong Chi-him	791	60.52	−6.80
FTU	Lee Kwong-yu	781	59.76	N/A
Total valid votes		1,307		
Rejected ballots		0		
Turnout		1,307	90.70	−7.78
Registered electors		1,441		
DAB hold		Swing		
Independent gain from Independent		Swing		
NPP gain from FTU		Swing		
Independent gain from Independent		Swing		

The elected members were sworn into office on 19 December.

== See also ==
- 2021 Hong Kong legislative election
- 2022 Hong Kong Chief Executive election
- List of Hong Kong by-elections
