= Michael Tien =

Hong Kong politician and businessman

The Honourable Michael Tien Puk-sun BBS JP
- 田北辰
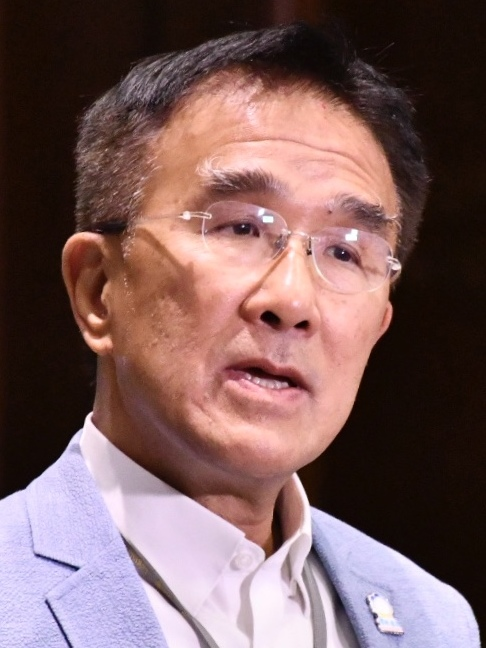

Member of the Legislative Council
- In office 1 January 2022 – 31 December 2025
- Preceded by: New constituency
- Succeeded by: Mark Chong
- Constituency: New Territories North West
- In office 1 October 2012 – 31 December 2021
- Preceded by: Lee Wing-tat
- Succeeded by: Constituency abolished
- Constituency: New Territories West

Member of the Tsuen Wan District Council
- In office 1 January 2012 – 31 December 2019
- Succeeded by: Adrian Lau
- Constituency: Discovery Park

Chairman of the Kowloon-Canton Railway Corporation
- In office 24 December 2001 – 2 December 2007

Personal details
- Born: 26 August 1950 (age 76) Hong Kong
- Party: Liberal Party (2008–10); New People's Party (2011–17); Roundtable (2017–present)
- Spouse: Frances Tien
- Relations: James Tien (brother)
- Children: 1 son and 3 daughters
- Parent: Francis Tien
- Education: Diocesan Boys' School; Worcester Academy; Cornell University; Harvard Business School
- Occupation: Politician; Businessman
- Website: www.michaeltien.hk

Michael Tien
- Chinese: 田北辰
Transcriptions
Standard Mandarin
- Hanyu Pinyin: Tián Běichén
Yue: Cantonese
- Jyutping: Tin^{4} Bak^{1}san^{4}

Michael Tien Puk-sun (Chinese: 田北辰; born 26 August 1950) is a Hong Kong politician, businessman and former member of the Legislative Council. He is the founder and chairman of the G2000 and U2 Clothing retail chains and former chairman of the Kowloon-Canton Railway Corporation (KCRC). He was formerly a member of the Liberal Party, which was led by his elder brother, James Tien, and a member of the New People's Party.

== History ==
Tien was appointed as the chairman of the Kowloon-Canton Railway Corporation (KCRC) in December 2001 amid public criticism on his predecessor, K. Y. Yeung. He proposed and implemented administrative reforms that enhanced KCRC's transparency and accountability; he regularly attended Legco meetings and explained the company's policies and decisions. In 2006, Tien resigned as chairman of the KCRC due to disputes with other directors over his management style.

Tien joined the Liberal Party in 2008 and became District Officer for Kowloon West. He quit the party in 2010 and started the New People's Party with Regina Ip, of which he became the deputy chairman.

In the 2017 Chief Executive election, Tien supported his party chairwoman Regina Ip. He complained the election had "lost its shape" due to the increasing interference of "an invisible hand", referring to the Liaison Office. Tien inclined his support for John Tsang after Ip dropped out, although Ip endorsed Carrie Lam on the last day before the election. Tien eventually quit the party on 10 April with six District Councillors.

In the 2019 District Council elections, Tien lost his Tsuen Wan District Council seat following a rout of pro-Beijing candidates amidst the 2019–20 Hong Kong protests.

In December 2021, it was reported that Tien was eligible to vote four times in the 2021 Hong Kong legislative election, yielding 0.0328896% of the total voting value (elected seats), which is 6618 times more than the value of an average voter's total voting value.

== Background and education ==
Tien attended Diocesan Boys' School and spent a year at Worcester Academy in the United States. Tien has a degree in electrical engineering from Cornell University and an MBA from Harvard Business School.

== Property ownership ==
According to Tien's January 2022 declaration of assets, he owns property in Hong Kong, mainland China, and the United States.

== Current posts ==
- Member of the Legislative Council of Hong Kong (New Territories North West (2021 constituency))
- Member of National People’s Congress, PRC (Hong Kong Deputy)
- Chairman of Employees Retraining Board (ERB)
- Chairman of Standing Committee on Language Education and Research (SCOLAR)
- Member of Manpower Development Committee (MDC)
- Member of Education Commission (EC)
- Chairman of Retail Industry Working Group under the Skills Upgrading Scheme (EDB)
- Supervisor of David Li Kwok Po College

== Previous posts ==
- Chairman of Kowloon-Canton Railway Corporation (KCRC)
- Chairman of the Privatization Sub-group of the Business Advisory Group (BAG), under the Financial Secretary’s Office
- Chairman of Wholesale, Retail, Import & Export Training Board, Vocational Training Council (VTC)
- Chairman of Working Group on Professional Relevance Advisory Committee on Teacher Education & Qualification (ACTEQ)
- Chairman of Advisory Committee to School of Design, Hong Kong Polytechnic University
- Member of Hong Kong Broadcasting Authority
- Council Member of Hong Kong Productivity Council (HKPC)
- Member of Language Fund Advisory Committee (LFAC), Education Department
- Member of Tsuen Wan District Council (Discovery Park Constituency)
- Alternate Member of Listing Committee, Hong Kong Stock Exchange
- Member of Hong Kong Sports Development Board
- Director of The Community Chest of Hong Kong
- Chairman, Liberal Party Kowloon West Regional Office

Political offices
Preceded by Louis Wong Yui-tak	Member of Tsuen Wan District Council; Representative for Discovery Park; 2012–2019	Succeeded by Lau Cheuk-yu
Legislative Council of Hong Kong
Preceded by Lee Wing-tat	Member of Legislative Council; Representative for New Territories West; 2012–2021	Constituency abolished
New constituency	Member of Legislative Council; Representative for New Territories North West; 2022–present	Incumbent
Order of precedence
Preceded by Claudia Mo; Member of the Legislative Council	Hong Kong order of precedence Member of the Legislative Council	Succeeded by Steven Ho; Member of the Legislative Council
