= Stephen Wong (politician) =

Hong Kong politician

The Honourable Stephen Wong
- 黃元山
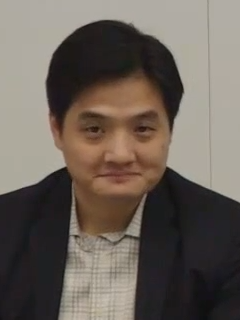
- Wong in 2014

Member of the Legislative Council
- In office 1 January 2022 – 27 December 2022
- Preceded by: New constituency
- Constituency: Election Committee

Personal details
- Born: 22 December 1975 (age 50)
- Education: University of Chicago (BA); Yale University (MA); University of Hong Kong (DPA)

Stephen Wong Yuen-shan (Chinese: 黃元山; born 22 December 1975) is a Hong Kong policy researcher and politician who is the senior vice president of the Our Hong Kong Foundation, a non-profit organisation founded by the former Hong Kong chief executive Tung Chee-hwa, and also the executive director of the foundation's public policy institute. In 2021, he was elected as a member of the Legislative Council for the 1,448-strong Election Committee constituency which was newly created under the electoral overhaul imposed by Beijing.

Wong was appointed by Chief Executive John Lee as the inaugural head of the Chief Executive's Policy Unit on 27 December. He subsequently resigned from the Legislative Council.

== Personal life ==
In September 2022, Wong tested positive for COVID-19.

== Electoral history ==
2021 Legislative Council election: Election Committee
Party	Candidate	Votes	%	±%
BPA (KWND)	Leung Mei-fun	1,348	94.93	
DAB	Cheung Kwok-kwan	1,342	94.51	
FEW	Tang Fei	1,339	94.30	
Nonpartisan	Maggie Chan Man-ki	1,331	93.73	
FTU	Alice Mak Mei-kuen	1,326	93.38	
DAB	Elizabeth Quat	1,322	93.10	
NPP (Civil Force)	Yung Hoi-yan	1,313	92.46	
Nonpartisan	Hoey Simon Lee	1,308	92.11	
Nonpartisan	Stephen Wong Yuen-shan	1,305	91.90	
DAB	Rock Chen Chung-nin	1,297	91.34	
Nonpartisan	Chan Hoi-yan	1,292	90.99	
Nonpartisan	Carmen Kan Wai-mun	1,291	90.92	
NPP	Judy Kapui Chan	1,284	90.42	
Independent	Paul Tse Wai-chun	1,283	90.35	
Nonpartisan	Junius Ho Kwan-yiu	1,263	88.94	
Nonpartisan	Tan Yueheng	1,245	87.68	
Nonpartisan	Chan Siu-hung	1,239	87.25	
Nonpartisan	Ng Kit-chong	1,239	87.25	
NPP	Lai Tung-kwok	1,237	87.11	
New Forum	Ma Fung-kwok	1,234	86.90	
Nonpartisan	Lau Chi-pang	1,214	85.49	
Nonpartisan	Chan Pui-leung	1,205	84.86	
FTU	Kingsley Wong Kwok	1,192	83.94	
Nonpartisan	Chan Yuet-ming	1,187	83.59	
DAB	Nixie Lam Lam	1,181	83.17	
FTU	Luk Chung-hung	1,178	82.96	
Nonpartisan	Kenneth Leung Yuk-wai	1,160	81.69	
Nonpartisan	Dennis Lam Shun-chiu	1,157	81.48	
Nonpartisan	Wendy Hong Wen	1,142	80.42	
Nonpartisan	Sun Dong	1,124	79.15	
DAB	Lillian Kwok Ling-lai	1,122	79.01	
Nonpartisan	Peter Douglas Koon Ho-ming	1,102	77.61	
Nonpartisan	Chow Man-kong	1,060	74.65	
Liberal	Lee Chun-keung	1,060	74.65	
BPA	Benson Luk Hoi-man	1,059	74.58	
Nonpartisan	Doreen Kong Yuk-foon	1,032	72.68	
Nonpartisan	Andrew Lam Siu-lo	1,026	72.25	
Nonpartisan	So Cheung-wing	1,013	71.34	
FLU	Lam Chun-sing	1,002	70.56	
Nonpartisan	Nelson Lam Chi-yuen	970	68.31	
Nonpartisan	Charles Ng Wang-wai	958	67.46	
Nonpartisan	Wong Chi-him	956	67.32	
Nonpartisan	Allan Zeman	955	67.25	
DAB	Chan Hoi-wing	941	66.27	
Nonpartisan	Tseng Chin-i	919	64.72	
Independent	Kevin Sun Wei-yung	891	62.75	
Nonpartisan	Tu Hai-ming	834	58.73	
FTU	Choy Wing-keung	818	57.61	
Nonpartisan	Fung Wai-kwong	708	49.86	
Nonpartisan	Michael John Treloar Rowse	454	31.97	
Nonpartisan	Diu Sing-hung	342	24.08	
Total valid votes		1,420	100.00	
Rejected ballots		6		
Turnout		1,426	98.48	
Registered electors		1,448		

New constituency	Member of Legislative Council; Representative for Election Committee; 2022–present	Incumbent
