= Nelson Lam =

Hong Kong politician

The Honourable Nelson Lam JP
- 林智遠
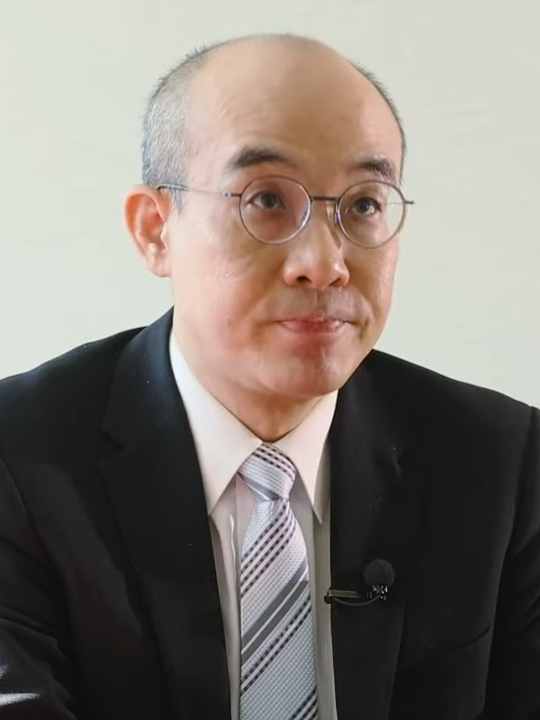

5th Director of Audit
- Incumbent
- Assumed office 1 July 2022
- Preceded by: John Chu

Member of the Legislative Council
- In office 1 January 2022 – 18 June 2022
- Preceded by: New constituency
- Succeeded by: William Wong
- Constituency: Election Committee

Personal details
- Born: August 20, 1968 (age 58)
- Education: Hong Kong Baptist University (BBA); Hong Kong University of Science and Technology (MBA); Chinese University of Hong Kong (MSc)

Nelson Lam Chi-yuen, JP (Chinese: 林智遠, born 20 August 1968) is a Hong Kong accountant and politician who is Director of Audit. To take up the role, from 1 July 2022, he resigned as a Legislative Councillor in the Election Committee constituency (ECC) after less than six months in office. The ECC was then newly created under the electoral overhaul imposed by Beijing.

On 5 January 2022, Carrie Lam announced new warnings and restrictions against social gathering due to potential COVID-19 outbreaks. One day later, it was discovered that Lam attended a birthday party hosted by Witman Hung Wai-man, with 222 guests. At least one guest tested positive with COVID-19, causing many guests to be quarantined.

When asked why Lam was focusing on national security instead of auditing public money, Lam said "Efficiency and effectiveness refers to whether the audited body abided by the law or not. If they have failed to do so that means they are doing a poor job. If they have broken the law, that would also involve money."

== Electoral history ==
2021 legislative election: Election Committee
No.	Candidates	Affiliation	Votes	%
1	Luk Chung-hung	FTU	1,178	
2	Ma Fung-kwok	New Forum	1,234	
3	Kingsley Wong Kwok	FTU	1,192	
4	Chan Hoi-yan	Nonpartisan	1,292	
5	Tang Fei	FEW	1,339	
6	Michael John Treloar Rowse	Nonpartisan	454	
7	Paul Tse Wai-chun	Independent	1,283	
8	Diu Sing-hung	Nonpartisan	342	
9	Tseng Chin-i	Nonpartisan	919	
10	Nelson Lam Chi-yuen	Nonpartisan	970	
11	Peter Douglas Koon Ho-ming	Nonpartisan	1,102	
12	Andrew Lam Siu-lo	Nonpartisan	1,026	
13	Chow Man-kong	Nonpartisan	1,060	
14	Doreen Kong Yuk-foon	Nonpartisan	1,032	
15	Fung Wai-kwong	Nonpartisan	708	
16	Chan Yuet-ming	Nonpartisan	1,187	
17	Simon Hoey Lee	Nonpartisan	1,308	
18	Judy Kapui Chan	NPP	1,284	
19	Wong Chi-him	Nonpartisan	956	
20	Maggie Chan Man-ki	Nonpartisan	1,331	
21	So Cheung-wing	Nonpartisan	1,013	
22	Sun Dong	Nonpartisan	1,124	
23	Tu Hai-ming	Nonpartisan	834	
24	Tan Yueheng	Nonpartisan	1,245	
25	Ng Kit-chong	Nonpartisan	1,239	
26	Chan Siu-hung	Nonpartisan	1,239	
27	Hong Wen	Nonpartisan	1,142	
28	Dennis Lam Shun-chiu	Nonpartisan	1,157	
29	Rock Chen Chung-nin	DAB	1,297	
30	Yung Hoi-yan	NPP/CF	1,313	
31	Chan Pui-leung	Nonpartisan	1,205	
32	Lau Chi-pang	Nonpartisan	1,214	
33	Carmen Kan Wai-mun	Nonpartisan	1,291	
34	Nixie Lam Lam	DAB	1,181	
35	Luk Hon-man	BPA	1,059	
36	Elizabeth Quat	DAB	1,322	
37	Lilian Kwok Ling-lai	DAB	1,122	
38	Lai Tung-kwok	NPP	1,237	
39	Leung Mei-fun	BPA/KWND	1,348	
40	Ho Kwan-yiu	Nonpartisan	1,263	
41	Chan Hoi-wing	DAB	941	
42	Alice Mak Mei-kuen	FTU	1,326	
43	Kevin Sun Wei-yung	Independent	891	
44	Stephen Wong Yuen-shan	Nonpartisan	1,305	
45	Lee Chun-keung	Liberal	1,060	
46	Cheung Kwok-kwan	DAB	1,342	
47	Kenneth Leung Yuk-wai	Nonpartisan	1,160	
48	Allan Zeman	Nonpartisan	955	
49	Lam Chun-sing	FLU	1,002	
50	Charles Ng Wang-wai	Nonpartisan	958	
51	Choy Wing-keung	FTU	818	

Legislative Council of Hong Kong
New constituency	Member of Legislative Council; Representative for Election Committee; 2022–2022	Succeeded by William Wong
