= Lo Suk-ching =

Lo Suk-ching 羅叔清 BBS, JP

Deputy of Hong Kong to the NPC
- In office 9th National People's Congress; 10th National People's Congress; 11th National People's Congress
- Incumbent
- Assumed office 8 December 1997

President of the Legislative Council
- In office 25 January 1997 – 30 September 2008

Member of the Provisional Legislative Council
- In office 21 December 1996 – 30 June 1998

Member of the Legislative Council
- In office 11 October 1995 – 30 June 1997
- Constituency: Election Committee

Personal details
- Born: 22 June 1950 (age 75) Hong Kong
- Party: New Territories Association of Societies
- Children: 2

Lo Suk-ching, BBS, JP (born 22 June 1950, Hong Kong) is a Hong Kong politician. He was the member of the Legislative Council (1995–97) for the Election Committee and also the Provisional Legislative Council (1996–98). He was the chairman of the New Territories Association of Societies and member of the National People's Congress.

Legislative Council of Hong Kong
New constituency	Member of Legislative Council; Representative for Election Committee; 1995–1997; Served alongside: Choy Kan-pui, Anthony Cheung, Ambrose Lau, Ip Kwok-him, David Chu, Chan Kam-lam, Law Cheung-kwok, John Tse, Yum Sin-ling	Replaced by Provisional Legislative Council
New parliament	Member of Provisional Legislative Council; 1997–1998	Replaced by Legislative Council
