= Law Cheung-kwok =

Law Cheung-kwok 羅祥國

Member of the Provisional Legislative Council
- In office 21 December 1996 – 30 June 1998

Member of the Legislative Council
- In office 11 October 1995 – 30 June 1997
- Constituency: Election Committee

Personal details
- Born: 26 September 1949 (age 76) Hong Kong
- Party: Association for Democracy and People's Livelihood; New Century Forum; Civil Force
- Children: 2

Law Cheung-kwok (born 26 September 1949, Hong Kong) was a member of the Sai Kung District Council (1994–2007) representing Hong King. He was also a member of the Legislative Council (1995–97) representing for the Election Committee. He joined the Provisional Legislative Council which existed from 1996 to 1998 with other members of the Association for Democracy and People's Livelihood (ADPL), while other pro-democrats boycotted it. He quit the ADPL around 1998 and joined the New Century Forum and Civil Force afterward. He contested in the 1998 and 2000 Legislative Council but failed to go back to the Legislative Council.

Legislative Council of Hong Kong
New constituency	Member of Legislative Council; Representative for Election Committee; 1995–1997; Served alongside: Lo Suk-ching, Choy Kan-pui, Anthony Cheung, Ambrose Lau, Ip Kwok-him, David Chu, Chan Kam-lam, John Tse, Yum Sin-ling	Replaced by Provisional Legislative Council
New parliament	Member of Provisional Legislative Council; 1997–1998	Replaced by Legislative Council
