= Yum Sin-ling =

Hong Kong politician

Lawrence Yum Sin Ling (traditional Chinese: 任善寧; simplified Chinese: 任善宁; pinyin: Rén Shànníng; born 1948) was a member of the Hong Kong Legislative Council from 1995 to 1997 and a district councillor for Kowloon City District of Hong Kong from 1994 to 1997 (Prince constituency). He is a founding member of a pro-Republic of China (Taiwan) political organisation 123 Democratic Alliance.

Yum contested in the Hong Kong Legislative Council election in 1998, but was unelected.

His son, Edward Yum, is a political activist in Hong Kong.

Legislative Council of Hong Kong
New constituency	Member of Legislative Council; Representative for Election Committee; 1995–1997; Served alongside: Lo Suk-ching, Choy Kan-pui, Anthony Cheung, Ambrose Lau, Ip Kwok-him, David Chu, Chan Kam-lam, Law Cheung-kwok, John Tse	Replaced by Provisional Legislative Council
