= 2001 Hong Kong Election Committee (constituency) by-election =

2001 Election Committee by-election
← 2000	16 September 2001	2004 →
- Turnout: 89.6%
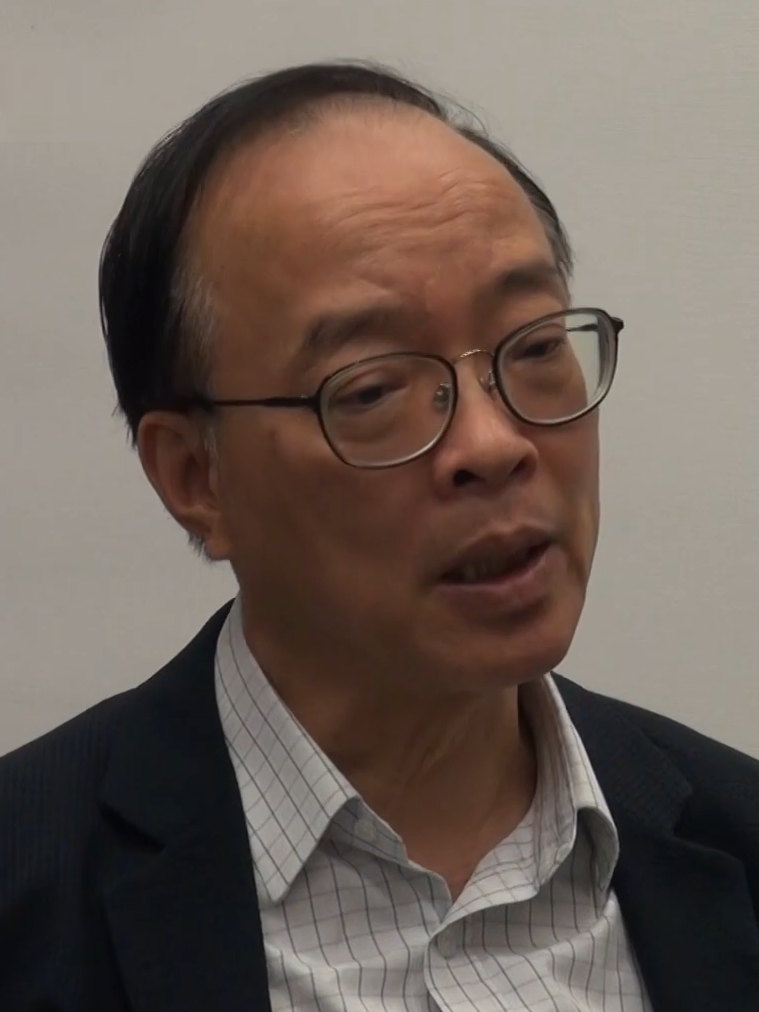
Candidate	Ma Fung-kwok	Ho Sai-chu	Chan Man-hung
Party	Nonpartisan	Liberal	Nonpartisan
Electoral vote	359	294	34
Percentage	51.7%	42.4%	4.9%
Member before election
Ng Ching-fai (resigned)
Nonpartisan
Elected Member
Ma Fung-kwok
Nonpartisan

The 2001 Election Committee by-election was held on 16 September 2001 after resignation of the incumbent Legislative Councillor Professor Ng Ching-fai who represented one of the six seats in the Election Committee constituency, from the Legislative Council (LegCo) with effect from 15 July 2001.

Ng Ching-fai of the New Century Forum (NCF) resigned in 2001 to take the vice-chancellorship of the Hong Kong Baptist University. NCF convenor Ma Fung-kwok who ran as a nonpartisan was elected with 359 votes, representing about 52% of the total number of valid votes cast, defeating two other candidates, Ho Sai-chu of the Liberal Party and nonpartisan Chan Man-hung.

== Candidates ==
During the nomination period from 2 to August 2001, three nominations were received, including the Liberal Party's Ho Sai-chu, New Century Forum's Ma Fung-kwok, who ran as a nonpartisan, and nonpartisan Chan Man-hung.

== Result ==
Election Committee by-election 2001
Party	Candidate	Votes	%	±%
Nonpartisan (New Forum)	Ma Fung-kwok	359	51.7	+1.4
Liberal	Ho Sai-chu	294	42.4	−8.1
Nonpartisan	Chan Man-hung	34	4.9	
Majority		65	9.3	
Total valid votes		687	100.0	
Rejected ballots		7		
Turnout		694	89.6	
Registered electors		775		
Nonpartisan gain from Nonpartisan		Swing	+4.8	

== See also ==
- 2000 Hong Kong legislative election
- List of Hong Kong by-elections
