= Ho Sai-chu =

The Honourable Ho Sai-chu GBM, JP
- 何世柱

Member of the Legislative Council
- In office 1 July 1998 – 30 June 2000
- Constituency: Election Committee
- In office 30 October 1985 – 22 August 1991
- Succeeded by: Philip Wong
- Constituency: Commercial (Second)

Member of the Provisional Legislative Council
- In office 21 December 1996 – 30 June 1998

Personal details
- Born: 6 June 1937 (age 89) Hong Kong
- Party: Liberal Party (1990s–2009)
- Spouse: Selina Ko Tze-ha
- Children: 2
- Education: Wah Yan College, Hong Kong; Hong Kong Technical College
- Occupation: General Manager

Ho Sai-chu, GBM, JP (Chinese: 何世柱; born 6 June 1937) was a Hong Kong entrepreneur and the member of the Legislative Council from 1985 to 1991 for Commercial (Second) constituency, Provisional Legislative Council from 1996 to 1998 and Legislative Council after the transfer of the Hong Kong sovereignty in 1998 to 2000 for the Election Committee constituency. He is also the member of the Chinese People's Political Consultative Conference National Committee and life honorary chairman of the Chinese General Chamber of Commerce.

== Early life ==
Ho was born in Hong Kong on 6 June 1937 to an entrepreneur Ho Iu-kwong. He was educated at the Wah Yan College, Hong Kong and the Hong Kong Technical College, predecessor of the Hong Kong Polytechnic University.

He became a contractor and was the director of many construction and real estates companies, including director and manager of the Fook Lee Construction Company, director of the Fook Lee Estates and the Fook Lee Holdings. He was also the director of the United Builders Insurance Company and the chairman of the Chung Fu Petrochemical Company and the Bright Sources (Xian) Development.

== Public career ==
He was core member of the Building Contractors' Association was appointed member of the Registered Contractors' Disciplinary Board Panel, Building Development Advisory Committee and Building Contractors' Sub-committee.

Besides construction associations, Ho was also chairman of the Tung Wah Group of Hospitals and the South China Athletic Association and vice-chairman of the Hong Kong Football Association, president of New Life Psychiatric Rehabilitation Association, vice-president of the Hong Kong Discharged Prisoners' Aid Society. He was the four-time chairman of the Hong Kong Council of Social Service from 1972 to 1983.

He had been core member of the Chinese General Chamber of Commerce, a pro-Beijing chamber of commerce in Hong Kong. In 1985, he represented the chamber of commerce to sit in the Legislative Council of Hong Kong through the Second Commercial functional constituency. He served on the council until 1991 and was succeeded by Philip Wong. He was also appointed member of the National Committee of the Chinese People's Political Consultative Conference by the Beijing government.

In 1993, Ho and his wife were unsuccessfully prosecuted regarding financial dealings relating to the transfer of ownership of pro-China tabloid newspaper Tin Tin Daily News.

In 1996, he was elected to the Beijing-controlled Provisional Legislative Council. He went on to become the member of the first Legislative Council from 1998 to 2000 through the Election Committee constituency. He served on many public positions including a member of the Hong Kong Housing Authority and the Labour Advisory Board and chairman of the Protection of Wages on Insolvency Fund Board. He held positions of directorship of MTR Corporation and board membership of the Hong Kong International Airport.

He was involved in the city development of Guangzhou and served as the chairman of the Guangzhou Friendship Liaison Association, an honorary professor of Guangzhou University, a director of Jinan University and a director of Southeast University.

== Honours ==
For his public services, Ho was awarded Member of the Order of the British Empire (MBE) in 1973 and was later promoted to Officer of the Order of the British Empire (OBE). In 2007, he received a Gold Bauhinia Star (GBS) for his contributions in the Hong Kong Housing Authority. On 1 July 2015, he was awarded the Grand Bauhinia Medal (GBM), the highest honour of the SAR, in recognition of his contributions to the formulation of labour policies and the promotion of harmonious employer-employee relations in the past decades and also his efforts in serving on the Labour Advisory Board.

Legislative Council of Hong Kong
New parliament	Member of Provisional Legislative Council; 1997–1998	Replaced by Legislative Council
New parliament	Member of Legislative Council; Representative for Election Committee; 1998–2000; Served alongside: Rita Fan, Ng Leung-sing, Ng Ching-fai, Ambrose Lau, Yeung Yiu-chung, David Chu, Chan Kam-lam, Ma Fung-kwok, Choy So-yuk	Seat abolished
