= Andrew Lam Siu-lo =

Hong Kong politician

The Honourable Andrew Lam SBS JP
- 林筱魯
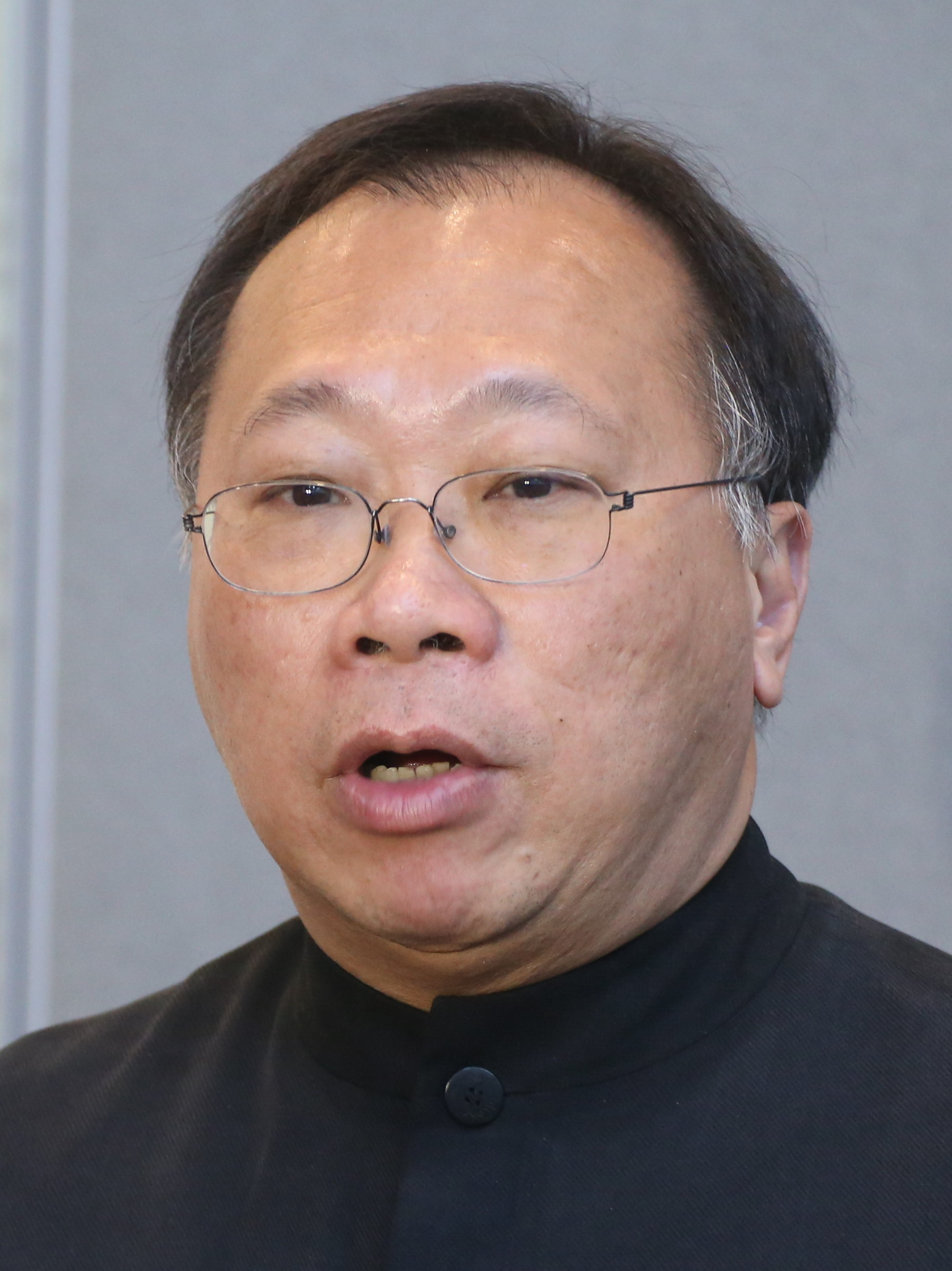
- Lam in 2018

Member of the Legislative Council
- Incumbent
- Assumed office 1 January 2022
- Preceded by: Constituency established
- Constituency: Election Committee

Personal details
- Education: University at Buffalo (BS); University of Hong Kong (MSc)

Andrew Lam Siu-lo, SBS, JP (Chinese: 林筱魯) is a Hong Kong businessman and politician who has been a member of the Legislative Council for the Election Committee constituency since 2021 which was newly created under the electoral overhaul imposed by Beijing. He was re-elected as Legislative Councilor for the same constituency in 2025.

== Electoral history ==
2021 legislative election: Election Committee
No.	Candidates	Affiliation	Votes	%
1	Luk Chung-hung	FTU	1,178	
2	Ma Fung-kwok	New Forum	1,234	
3	Kingsley Wong Kwok	FTU	1,192	
4	Chan Hoi-yan	Nonpartisan	1,292	
5	Tang Fei	FEW	1,339	
6	Michael John Treloar Rowse	Nonpartisan	454	
7	Paul Tse Wai-chun	Independent	1,283	
8	Diu Sing-hung	Nonpartisan	342	
9	Tseng Chin-i	Nonpartisan	919	
10	Nelson Lam Chi-yuen	Nonpartisan	970	
11	Peter Douglas Koon Ho-ming	Nonpartisan	1,102	
12	Andrew Lam Siu-lo	Nonpartisan	1,026	
13	Chow Man-kong	Nonpartisan	1,060	
14	Doreen Kong Yuk-foon	Nonpartisan	1,032	
15	Fung Wai-kwong	Nonpartisan	708	
16	Chan Yuet-ming	Nonpartisan	1,187	
17	Simon Hoey Lee	Nonpartisan	1,308	
18	Judy Kapui Chan	NPP	1,284	
19	Wong Chi-him	Nonpartisan	956	
20	Maggie Chan Man-ki	Nonpartisan	1,331	
21	So Cheung-wing	Nonpartisan	1,013	
22	Sun Dong	Nonpartisan	1,124	
23	Tu Hai-ming	Nonpartisan	834	
24	Tan Yueheng	Nonpartisan	1,245	
25	Ng Kit-chong	Nonpartisan	1,239	
26	Chan Siu-hung	Nonpartisan	1,239	
27	Hong Wen	Nonpartisan	1,142	
28	Dennis Lam Shun-chiu	Nonpartisan	1,157	
29	Rock Chen Chung-nin	DAB	1,297	
30	Yung Hoi-yan	NPP/CF	1,313	
31	Chan Pui-leung	Nonpartisan	1,205	
32	Lau Chi-pang	Nonpartisan	1,214	
33	Carmen Kan Wai-mun	Nonpartisan	1,291	
34	Nixie Lam Lam	DAB	1,181	
35	Luk Hon-man	BPA	1,059	
36	Elizabeth Quat	DAB	1,322	
37	Lilian Kwok Ling-lai	DAB	1,122	
38	Lai Tung-kwok	NPP	1,237	
39	Leung Mei-fun	BPA/KWND	1,348	
40	Ho Kwan-yiu	Nonpartisan	1,263	
41	Chan Hoi-wing	DAB	941	
42	Alice Mak Mei-kuen	FTU	1,326	
43	Kevin Sun Wei-yung	Independent	891	
44	Stephen Wong Yuen-shan	Nonpartisan	1,305	
45	Lee Chun-keung	Liberal	1,060	
46	Cheung Kwok-kwan	DAB	1,342	
47	Kenneth Leung Yuk-wai	Nonpartisan	1,160	
48	Allan Zeman	Nonpartisan	955	
49	Lam Chun-sing	FLU	1,002	
50	Charles Ng Wang-wai	Nonpartisan	958	
51	Choy Wing-keung	FTU	818	
