= Edward Yum =

Hong Kong politician (born 1979)

Edward Yum Liang-Hsien (Chinese: 任亮憲; pinyin: Rén Liàngxiàn; born 1979). He is the son of former Legislative Council member Yum Sin-ling, who once held a pro-Kuomintang party in Hong Kong called the 123 Democratic Alliance.

== Career ==
Yum is best known for his participation at the Victoria Park, City Forum. He is known for shouting at pro-establishment figures, which earned him the nickname "Big brother of Victoria park". He has also been called the Grass Mud Horse.

== Controversy ==
=== License issue ===
Questions have been raised about Yum being described as a licensed Securities and Futures Commission representative when his permit was expired. In his weekly column and the website of iMoney magazine and the League of Social Democrats website, he has been described as a representative.

=== Sex scandal accusations ===
In mid December 2010, a 29-year-old woman in Sha Tin accused Yum of rape and indecent assault. After the first arrest Yum considered suing a local newspaper and a woman for their comments since this arrest. On 20 December 2010 a 19-year-old woman in Central filed a police report against Yum for sexual assault. This also came at a time after 30 pan-democrats resigned over the dissatisfaction with a leadership meeting with Beijing. The group was extremely fragmented with internal political issues.

By May 2011, Yum was no longer under investigation by the police due to a complete lack of evidence.

== 2018 Legislative By-election ==
On 23 January 2018, Yum declared that he would run in the Hong Kong Island by-election triggered by the disqualification of Demosisto's Nathan Law. Yum received 3580 votes and was not elected.

== See also ==
- Hong Kong Localism Power (2015)
