= Election Committee (constituency) =

Functional constituency of the Legislative Council of Hong Kong

- Election Committee constituency for the Legislative Council of Hong Kong
- Electorate: 283 (1995–1997); 800 (1998–2004); 1,500 (2021)

Current constituency
- Created: 1995 (first); 1998 (second); 2021 (third)
- Number of members: 10 (1995–1997; 1998–2000); 6 (2000–2004); 40 (2021–)

The Election Committee constituency (ECC; 選舉委員會界別) is a constituency in the elections for the Legislative Council of Hong Kong. It was first introduced in 1995, re-created with a different composition in 1998 until it was abolished in 2004, and introduced for the third time in the 2021 electoral overhaul. It is the single largest constituency, taking 40 out of the 90 seats in the Legislative Council.

The Election Committee constituency was one of the three sectors designed in the Basic Law of Hong Kong next to the directly elected geographical constituencies and the indirectly elected functional constituencies in the early SAR period. With the last British Governor Chris Patten's electoral reform, the ECC was composed of all elected District Board members who had been elected in 1994. The Single Transferable Vote system was used in the 1995 election.

After the handover of Hong Kong, the ECC was allocated 10 seats out of the total 60 seats in the SAR Legislative Council, comprising all members of the Election Committee which also elected the Chief Executive every five years. The size of the constituency reduced to six seats in 2000 and was entirely abolished and replaced by the directly elected geographical constituency seats in the 2004 election. The plurality-at-large voting system was used in 1998 and 2000.

In the 2021 electoral overhaul, the Election Committee constituency was reintroduced, taking 40 of the 90 seats, almost half, of the Legislative Council with plurality-at-large voting system. The electorate is composed of all newly expanded 1,500 members in the Election Committee.

== Returning members ==
=== 1995–1997 ===
Members	Party
Law Cheung-kwok	ADPL
Yum Sin-ling	123DA
Cheung Bing-leung	Democratic
John Tse Wing-ling	Democratic
Lo Suk-ching	Independent
Choy Kan-pui	Independent (CF)
Lau Hon-chuen	HKPA
David Chu Yu-lin	LDF
Chan Kam-lam	DAB
Ip Kwok-him	DAB

=== 1998–2004 ===
1998	2000	2001 (b)	2004
Yeung Yiu-chung (DAB)			abolished
Ambrose Lau (Progressive Alliance)			abolished
David Chu (Progressive Alliance)			abolished
Rita Fan (Independent)			abolished
Ng Leung-sing (Independent)			abolished
Ng Ching-fai (Independent→NCF)		Ma Fung-kwok (NCF)	abolished
Ma Fung-kwok (Independent→NCF)	abolished		
Chan Kam-lam (DAB)	abolished		
Choy So-yuk (Progressive Alliance)	abolished		
Ho Sai-chu (Liberal)	abolished		

=== 2021–present ===
2021	2022 (b)	2025
Rock Chen (DAB)		
Nixie Lam (DAB)		
Elizabeth Quat (DAB)		
Horace Cheung (DAB)	Chan Wing-kwong (DAB)	
Lillian Kwok (DAB)		Ben Chan (DAB)
Judy Kapui Chan (NPP)		Roy Chu (DAB)
Yung Hoi-yan (NPP (CF))		Steven Ho (DAB)
Lai Tung-kwok (NPP)		Hung Kam-in (DAB)
Kingsley Wong (FTU)		
Luk Chung-hung (FTU)		Dennis Leung (FTU)
Alice Mak (FTU)	Adrian Ho (NPP)	
Priscilla Leung (BPA (KWND))		
Benson Luk (BPA)		Michelle Tang (BPA (KWND))
Lee Chun-keung (Liberal)		
Lam Chun-sing (FLU)		
Ma Fung-kwok (NCF)		Ng Wun-kit (FEW)
Tang Fei (FEW)		Wong Kam-leung (FEW)
Lau Chi-pang (Independent > FEW)		
Junius Ho (Independent)		
Chan Hoi-yan (Independent)		
Peter Douglas Koon (Independent)		
Andrew Lam (Independent)		
Hoey Simon Lee (Independent)		
Maggie Chan (Independent)		
Johnny Ng (Independent)		
Chan Siu-hung (Independent)		
Carmen Kan (Independent)		
Nelson Lam (Independent)	William Wong (Independent)	
Paul Tse (Independent)		Yiu Pak-leung (Independent)
Chow Man-kong (Independent)		Ngai Ming-tak (Independent)
Doreen Kong (Independent)		Lau Ka-keung (Independent)
Chan Yuet-ming (Independent)		Alan Chan (Independent)
So Cheung-wing (Independent)		Ginny Man (Independent)
Tan Yueheng (Independent)		Albert Chuang (Independent)
Wendy Hong (Independent)		Fan Hoi-kit (Independent)
Dennis Lam (Independent)		Elvin Lee (Independent)
Chan Pui-leung (Independent)		Chan Cho-kwong (Independent)
Stephen Wong (Note: Resigned in December 2022 and seat vacant thereafter) (Independent)		Thomas So (Independent)
Kenneth Leung (Independent)		Andrew Fan (Independent)
Sun Dong (Independent)	Shang Hailong (Independent)	Wu Yingpeng (Independent)

== Election results ==
The elected candidates are shown in bold.

=== 2020s ===
2025 Legislative Council election: Election Committee
Party	Candidate	Votes	%	±%
**Independent**	**Yiu Pak-leung**	**1,397**	**95.95**	
**Independent**	**Chan Hoi-yan**	**1,386**	**95.19**	
**Independent**	**Hoey Simon Lee**	**1,360**	**93.41**	
**Liberal**	**Michael Lee Chun-keung**	**1,354**	**92.99**	
**DAB (NTAS)**	**Ben Chan Han-pan**	**1,348**	**92.58**	
**Independent**	**Ngai Ming-tak**	**1,345**	**92.38**	
**DAB**	**Rock Chen Chung-nin**	**1,343**	**92.24**	
**Independent**	**Johnny Ng Kit-chong**	**1,331**	**91.41**	
**Independent**	**William Wong Kam-fai**	**1,329**	**91.28**	
**DAB**	**Elizabeth Quat**	**1,321**	**91.73**	
**BPA (KWND)**	**Priscilla Leung Mei-fun**	**1,316**	**90.38**	
**FLU**	**Lam Chun-sing**	**1,311**	**90.04**	
**Independent**	**Maggie Chan Man-ki**	**1,311**	**90.04**	
**Independent**	**Ginny Man Wing-yee**	**1,308**	**89.84**	
**FEW**	**Lau Chi-pang**	**1,275**	**87.57**	
**Independent**	**Chan Siu-hung**	**1,273**	**87.43**	
**DAB**	**Chan Wing-kwong**	**1,269**	**87.16**	
**Independent**	**Carmen Kan Wai-mun**	**1,268**	**87.09**	
**DAB (NTAS)**	**Steven Ho Chun-yin**	**1,267**	**87.02**	
**Independent**	**Junius Ho Kwan-yiu**	**1,241**	**85.23**	
**Independent**	**Peter Douglas Koon Ho-ming**	**1,233**	**84.68**	
**Independent**	**Lau Ka-keung**	**1,231**	**84.55**	
**NPP**	**Adrian Pedro Ho King-hong**	**1,210**	**83.10**	
**FEW**	**Wong Kam-leung**	**1,201**	**82.49**	
**Independent**	**Albert Chuang Ka-pun**	**1,194**	**82.01**	
**Independent**	**Elvin Lee Ka-kui**	**1,193**	**81.94**	
**Independent**	**Andrew Lam Siu-lo**	**1,189**	**81.66**	
**FTU**	**Kingsley Wong Kwok**	**1,187**	**81.52**	
**Independent (FEW)**	**Ng Wun-kit**	**1,164**	**79.95**	
**DAB**	**Nixie Lam Lam**	**1,160**	**79.67**	
**Independent**	**Andrew Fan Chun-wah**	**1,155**	**79.33**	
**DAB**	**Roy Chu Lap-wai**	**1,144**	**78.57**	
**FTU**	**Dennis Leung Tsz-wing**	**1,089**	**74.79**	
**Independent**	**Thomas So Shiu-tsung**	**1,076**	**73.90**	
**BPA (KWND)**	**Michelle Tang Ming-sum**	**1,073**	**73.70**	
**Independent**	**Chan Cho-kwong**	**1,067**	**73.28**	
**Independent**	**Alan Chan Chung-yee**	**1,066**	**73.21**	
**DAB**	**Hung Kam-in**	**1,042**	**71.57**	
**Independent**	**Fan Hoi-kit**	**1,034**	**71.02**	
**Independent**	**Wu Yingpeng**	**1,002**	**68.82**	
Independent	Fung Ying-lun	988	67.86	
Independent	Yolanda Ng Yuen-ting	970	66.62	
Independent	Tang Wing-chun	954	65.52	
Independent	Lau Chun-kong	954	65.52	
Independent	Andrew Kwok Chi-wah	947	65.04	
Independent	Chen Shaobo	937	64.35	
FTU	Ma Kwong-yu	934	64.15	
FPHE	Chiu Kwok-wai	887	60.92	
Independent	Kevin Orr Ka-yeung	813	55.84	
FTU	Tsang Chi-man	793	54.46	
Total valid votes		1,456	99.86	
Rejected ballots		2	0.14	
Turnout		1,458	99.45	
Registered electors		1,466		

2022 Election Committee by-election
Party	Candidate	Votes	%	±%
**DAB**	**Chan Wing-kwong**	**1,028**	**78.65**	**N/A**
**Independent**	**William Wong Kam-fai**	**983**	**75.21**	**N/A**
**NPP**	**Adrian Pedro Ho King-hong**	**833**	**63.73**	**N/A**
**Independent**	**Shang Hailong**	**812**	**62.13**	**N/A**
Independent	Gary Wong Chi-him	791	60.52	−6.80
FTU	Lee Kwong-yu	781	59.76	N/A
Total valid votes		1,307		
Rejected ballots		0		
Turnout		1,307	90.70	−7.78
Registered electors		1,441		
DAB **hold**		Swing		
Independent **hold**		Swing		
NPP **gain** from FTU		Swing		
Independent **hold**		Swing		

2021 Legislative Council election: Election Committee
Party	Candidate	Votes	%	±%
**BPA (KWND)**	**Leung Mei-fun**	**1,348**	**94.93**	
**DAB**	**Cheung Kwok-kwan**	**1,342**	**94.51**	
**FEW**	**Tang Fei**	**1,339**	**94.30**	
**Nonpartisan**	**Maggie Chan Man-ki**	**1,331**	**93.73**	
**FTU**	**Alice Mak Mei-kuen**	**1,326**	**93.38**	
**DAB**	**Elizabeth Quat**	**1,322**	**93.10**	
**NPP (Civil Force)**	**Yung Hoi-yan**	**1,313**	**92.46**	
**Nonpartisan**	**Hoey Simon Lee**	**1,308**	**92.11**	
**Nonpartisan**	**Stephen Wong Yuen-shan**	**1,305**	**91.90**	
**DAB**	**Rock Chen Chung-nin**	**1,297**	**91.34**	
**Nonpartisan**	**Chan Hoi-yan**	**1,292**	**90.99**	
**Nonpartisan**	**Carmen Kan Wai-mun**	**1,291**	**90.92**	
**NPP**	**Judy Kapui Chan**	**1,284**	**90.42**	
**Independent**	**Paul Tse Wai-chun**	**1,283**	**90.35**	
**Nonpartisan**	**Junius Ho Kwan-yiu**	**1,263**	**88.94**	
**Nonpartisan**	**Tan Yueheng**	**1,245**	**87.68**	
**Nonpartisan**	**Chan Siu-hung**	**1,239**	**87.25**	
**Nonpartisan**	**Ng Kit-chong**	**1,239**	**87.25**	
**NPP**	**Lai Tung-kwok**	**1,237**	**87.11**	
**New Forum**	**Ma Fung-kwok**	**1,234**	**86.90**	
**Nonpartisan**	**Lau Chi-pang**	**1,214**	**85.49**	
**Nonpartisan**	**Chan Pui-leung**	**1,205**	**84.86**	
**FTU**	**Kingsley Wong Kwok**	**1,192**	**83.94**	
**Nonpartisan**	**Chan Yuet-ming**	**1,187**	**83.59**	
**DAB**	**Nixie Lam Lam**	**1,181**	**83.17**	
**FTU**	**Luk Chung-hung**	**1,178**	**82.96**	
**Nonpartisan**	**Kenneth Leung Yuk-wai**	**1,160**	**81.69**	
**Nonpartisan**	**Dennis Lam Shun-chiu**	**1,157**	**81.48**	
**Nonpartisan**	**Wendy Hong Wen**	**1,142**	**80.42**	
**Nonpartisan**	**Sun Dong**	**1,124**	**79.15**	
**DAB**	**Lillian Kwok Ling-lai**	**1,122**	**79.01**	
**Nonpartisan**	**Peter Douglas Koon Ho-ming**	**1,102**	**77.61**	
**Nonpartisan**	**Chow Man-kong**	**1,060**	**74.65**	
**Liberal**	**Lee Chun-keung**	**1,060**	**74.65**	
**BPA**	**Benson Luk Hoi-man**	**1,059**	**74.58**	
**Nonpartisan**	**Doreen Kong Yuk-foon**	**1,032**	**72.68**	
**Nonpartisan**	**Andrew Lam Siu-lo**	**1,026**	**72.25**	
**Nonpartisan**	**So Cheung-wing**	**1,013**	**71.34**	
**FLU**	**Lam Chun-sing**	**1,002**	**70.56**	
**Nonpartisan**	**Nelson Lam Chi-yuen**	**970**	**68.31**	
Nonpartisan	Charles Ng Wang-wai	958	67.46	
Nonpartisan	Wong Chi-him	956	67.32	
Nonpartisan	Allan Zeman	955	67.25	
DAB	Chan Hoi-wing	941	66.27	
Nonpartisan	Tseng Chin-i	919	64.72	
Independent	Kevin Sun Wei-yung	891	62.75	
Nonpartisan	Tu Hai-ming	834	58.73	
FTU	Choy Wing-keung	818	57.61	
Nonpartisan	Fung Wai-kwong	708	49.86	
Nonpartisan	Michael John Treloar Rowse	454	31.97	
Nonpartisan	Diu Sing-hung	342	24.08	
Total valid votes		1,420	100.00	
Rejected ballots		6		
Turnout		1,426	98.48	
Registered electors		1,448		

=== 2000s ===
2001 Election Committee by-election
Party	Candidate	Votes	%	±%
**Independent (New Forum)**	**Ma Fung-kwok**	**359**	**52.26**	**N/A**
Liberal	Ho Sai-chu	294	42.79	N/A
Independent	Chan Man-hung	34	4.94	N/A
Majority		65	9.46	
Total valid votes		687	100.0	
Rejected ballots		7		
Turnout		694	89.55	
Registered electors		775		
Independent **gain** from Independent		Swing		

2000 Legislative Council election: Election Committee
Party	Candidate	Votes	%	±%
**Independent**	**Rita Hsu Lai-tai**	**651**	**90.54**	**+9.51**
**HKPA**	**Ambrose Lau Hon-chuen**	**594**	**82.61**	**+17.58**
**DAB**	**Yeung Yiu-chung**	**490**	**68.15**	**+11.25**
**Independent**	**Ng Leung-sing**	**483**	**67.18**	**−2.37**
**HKPA**	**David Chu Yu-lin**	**464**	**64.53**	**+4.01**
**Independent (New Forum)**	**Ng Ching-fai**	**401**	**55.77**	**N/A**
Liberal	Ho Sai-chu	378	52.57	+2.76
Independent (New Forum)	Ma Fung-kwok	376	52.29	−7.84
Independent	Shiu Sin-por	360	50.07	N/A
Independent	Ho Ka-cheong	117	16.27	+3.75
Total valid votes		719	100.00	
Rejected ballots		29		
Turnout		748	95.53	−3.22
Registered electors		783		

=== 1990s ===
1998 Legislative Council election: Election Committee
Party	Candidate	Votes	%	±%
**Independent**	**Rita Fan Hsu Lai-tai**	**628**	**81.03**	
**Independent**	**Ng Leung-sing**	**539**	**69.55**	
**Independent**	**Ng Ching-fai**	**530**	**68.39**	
**HKPA**	**Lau Hon-chuen**	**504**	**65.03**	
**HKPA**	**David Chu Yu-lin**	**469**	**60.52**	
**Independent**	**Ma Fung-kwok**	**466**	**60.13**	
**DAB**	**Yeung Yiu-chung**	**441**	**56.90**	
**DAB**	**Chan Kam-lam**	**432**	**55.74**	
**HKPA**	**Choy So-yuk**	**397**	**51.23**	
**Liberal**	**Ho Sai-chu**	**386**	**49.81**	
HKPA	Charles Yeung Chun-kam	380	49.03	
Independent	Peggy Lam Pei	346	44.65	
Independent	Kan Fook-yee	300	38.71	
NTAS (DAB)	Cheung Hok-ming	273	35.23	
ADPL	Law Cheung-kwok	259	33.42	
DAB	Thomas Pang Cheung-wai	226	29.16	
Independent	Joseph Hui Tak-fai	214	27.61	
Heung Yee Kuk	Pang Hang-yin	212	27.35	
Independent	Maria Joyce Chang Sau-han	149	19.23	
Independent	James Chiu	141	18.19	
Independent	Stephen Yam Chi-ming	137	17.68	
Independent	Ho Ka-cheong	97	12.52	
Independent (TUC)	Leung Tsz-leung	85	10.97	
Independent	Lee Kwong-lam	83	10.71	
Independent	Siu See-kong	56	7.23	
Total valid votes		775	100.00	
Rejected ballots		15		
Turnout		790	98.75	
Registered electors		800		

Single transferable vote was used in the 1995 election.

1995 Legislative Council election: Election Committee
Party	Candidate	Votes	%	±%
**Independent**	**Lo Suk-ching**	**26**		
**Independent (Civil Force)**	**Choy Kan-pui**	**26**		
**Democratic**	**Cheung Bing-Ieung**	**26**		
**HKPA**	**Lau Hon-chuen**	**26**		
**DAB**	**Chan Kam-lam**	**26**		
**ADPL**	**Law Cheung-kwok**	**26**		
**DAB**	**Ip Kwok-him**	**26**		
**Democratic**	**John Tse Wing-ling**	**26**		
**LDF**	**David Chu Yu-lin**	**26**		
**123DA**	**Yum Sin-ling**	**26**		
Independent (UFSP)	Yeung Fuk-kwong	0		
Independent	Lee York-fai	0		
Independent	Fung Kwong-chung	0		
ADPL	Leung Kwong-cheong	0		
Democratic	Yuen Bun-keung	0		
Liberal	Mark Lin	0		
Independent	Louis Leung Wing-on	0		
Independent	Paul Chan Sing-kong	0		
Total valid votes		282	100.00	
Rejected ballots		0		
Turnout		282	99.65	
Registered electors		283		
