= Carmen Kan =

Hong Kong politician

The Honourable Carmen Kan
- 簡慧敏
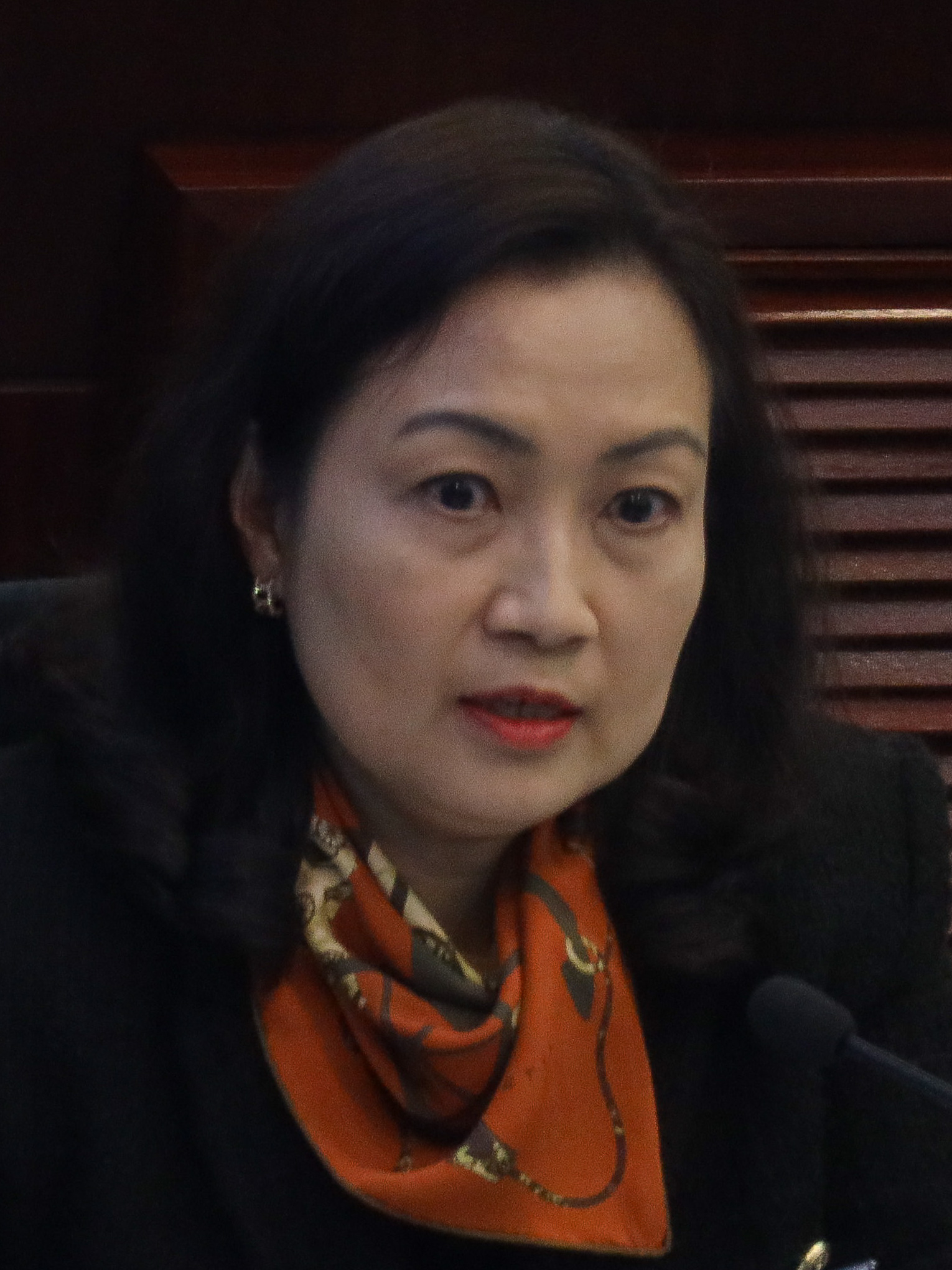
- Kan in 2023

Member of the Legislative Council
- Incumbent
- Assumed office 1 January 2022
- Preceded by: Constituency created
- Constituency: Election Committee

Personal details
- Born: 1968 (age 57–58)
- Education: University of Hong Kong (LLB); Tsinghua University (MPA)

Carmen Kan Wai-mun (Chinese: 簡慧敏; born 1968) is a Hong Kong solicitor, lawmaker, and member of the Legislative Council serving as Chair on the Panel on Administration of Justice and Legal Services. She is currently the deputy convenor of the G19, a non-partisan group of legislators. In addition, she is the Vice-President of the Hong Kong-China Women's Federation Delegation and the Vice-President of the Hong Kong Federation of Women Lawyers.

She belongs to the Election Committee constituency which was newly created under electoral changes in 2021. As a former partner of Clifford Chance from 2001 and 2010, currently the General Legal Counsel of the Bank of China Corporation, Kan specialises in corporate and banking law across Hong Kong and Mainland jurisdictions.

She currently serves in the Legislative Council's Finance Committee, Public Accounts Committee, Committee on Members' Interests, Committee on Rules of Procedure, and House Committee.

She is currently the Chairperson of the Panel on Administration of Justice and Legal Services. She also sits on the Panel on Security, Panel on Environmental Affairs, and Panel on Financial Affairs.

In November 2023, she was part of a group of lawmakers who said that the 2023 Gay Games may infringe on the national security law.

In December 2025, she was re-elected from Election Committee constituency.

== Electoral history ==
2021 legislative election: Election Committee
No.	Candidates	Affiliation	Votes	%
1	Luk Chung-hung	FTU	1,178	
2	Ma Fung-kwok	New Forum	1,234	
3	Kingsley Wong Kwok	FTU	1,192	
4	Chan Hoi-yan	Nonpartisan	1,292	
5	Tang Fei	FEW	1,339	
6	Michael John Treloar Rowse	Nonpartisan	454	
7	Paul Tse Wai-chun	Independent	1,283	
8	Diu Sing-hung	Nonpartisan	342	
9	Tseng Chin-i	Nonpartisan	919	
10	Nelson Lam Chi-yuen	Nonpartisan	970	
11	Peter Douglas Koon Ho-ming	Nonpartisan	1,102	
12	Andrew Lam Siu-lo	Nonpartisan	1,026	
13	Chow Man-kong	Nonpartisan	1,060	
14	Doreen Kong Yuk-foon	Nonpartisan	1,032	
15	Fung Wai-kwong	Nonpartisan	708	
16	Chan Yuet-ming	Nonpartisan	1,187	
17	Simon Hoey Lee	Nonpartisan	1,308	
18	Judy Kapui Chan	NPP	1,284	
19	Wong Chi-him	Nonpartisan	956	
20	Maggie Chan Man-ki	Nonpartisan	1,331	
21	So Cheung-wing	Nonpartisan	1,013	
22	Sun Dong	Nonpartisan	1,124	
23	Tu Hai-ming	Nonpartisan	834	
24	Tan Yueheng	Nonpartisan	1,245	
25	Ng Kit-chong	Nonpartisan	1,239	
26	Chan Siu-hung	Nonpartisan	1,239	
27	Hong Wen	Nonpartisan	1,142	
28	Dennis Lam Shun-chiu	Nonpartisan	1,157	
29	Rock Chen Chung-nin	DAB	1,297	
30	Yung Hoi-yan	NPP/CF	1,313	
31	Chan Pui-leung	Nonpartisan	1,205	
32	Lau Chi-pang	Nonpartisan	1,214	
33	Carmen Kan Wai-mun	Nonpartisan	1,291	
34	Nixie Lam Lam	DAB	1,181	
35	Luk Hon-man	BPA	1,059	
36	Elizabeth Quat	DAB	1,322	
37	Lilian Kwok Ling-lai	DAB	1,122	
38	Lai Tung-kwok	NPP	1,237	
39	Leung Mei-fun	BPA/KWND	1,348	
40	Ho Kwan-yiu	Nonpartisan	1,263	
41	Chan Hoi-wing	DAB	941	
42	Alice Mak Mei-kuen	FTU	1,326	
43	Kevin Sun Wei-yung	Independent	891	
44	Stephen Wong Yuen-shan	Nonpartisan	1,305	
45	Lee Chun-keung	Liberal	1,060	
46	Cheung Kwok-kwan	DAB	1,342	
47	Kenneth Leung Yuk-wai	Nonpartisan	1,160	
48	Allan Zeman	Nonpartisan	955	
49	Lam Chun-sing	FLU	1,002	
50	Charles Ng Wang-wai	Nonpartisan	958	
51	Choy Wing-keung	FTU	818	
