= HKFEW Wong Cho Bau Secondary School =

Secondary school in Hong Kong

- 香港教育工作者聯會黃楚標中學
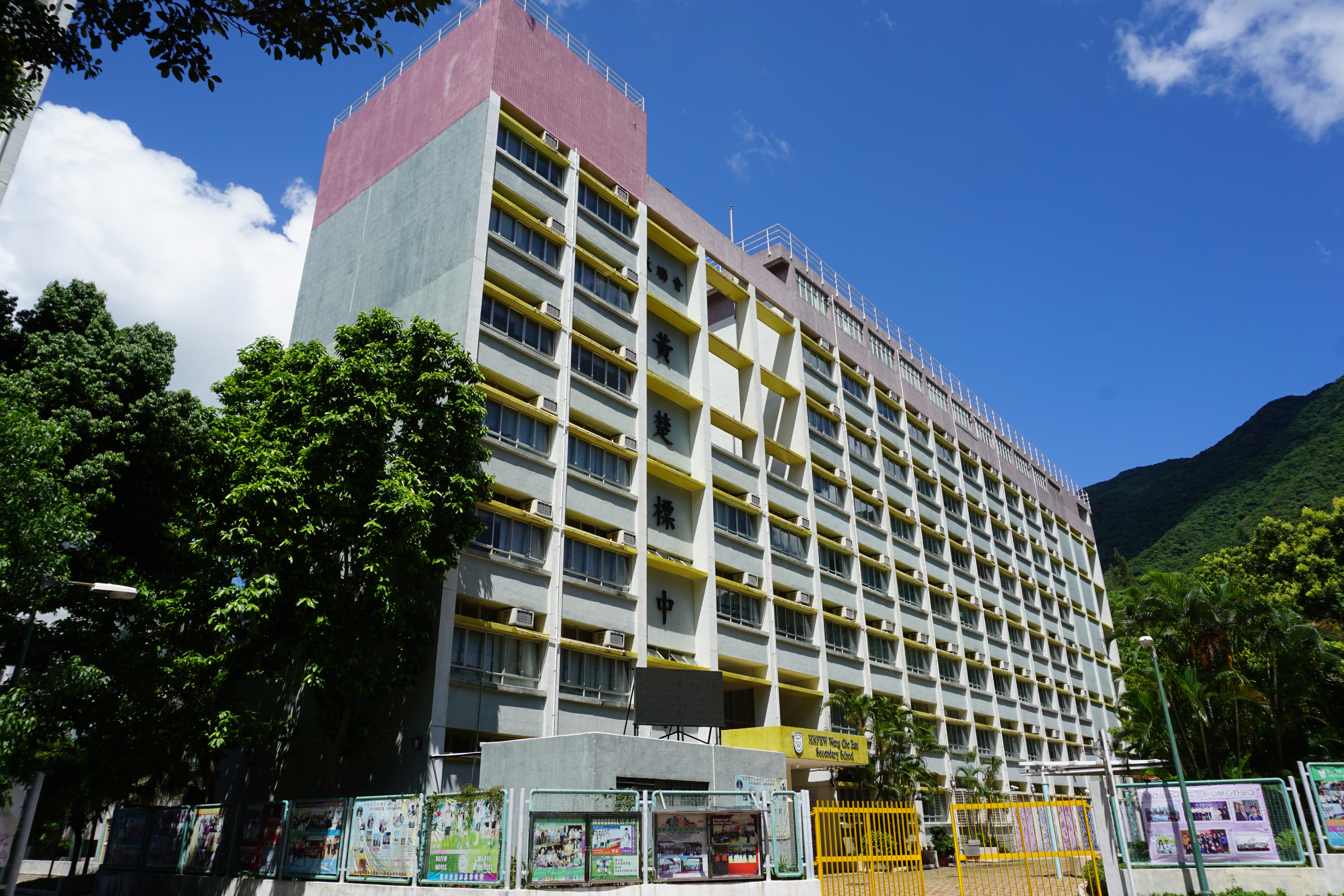
- Pictured in 2016

Location
- Area 10, Phase 3, Fu Tung Estate, Tung Chung, Lantau Island, New Territories; Hong Kong; 22.288331°N 113.944624°E

Information
- School type: Aided Secondary school
- Motto: Pragmatic and Innovative (求實創新)
- Established: September 2003; 23 years ago
- School district: Islands District
- Chairman: Wong Kwan-yu
- Principal: Chow Yu-fai
- Teaching staff: 65 (as of 2016)
- Years: 6
- Gender: Co-educational
  - Grade 1: (F.1) 195 (as of 2007)
  - Grade 2: (F.2) 196 (as of 2007)
  - Grade 3: (F.3) 182 (as of 2007)
  - Grade 4: (F.4) 189 (as of 2007)
  - Grade 5: (F.5) 180 (as of 2007)
  - Grade 6: (F.6) 61 (as of 2007)
- Classes: 22 (as of 2016)
- Language: Predominantly Chinese
- Campus size: About 400 m²
- Houses: Honesty; Trust; Benevolence; Love
- Affiliation: Hong Kong Federation of Education Workers
- Website: www.wcbss.edu.hk

HKFEW Wong Cho Bau Secondary School
- Traditional Chinese: 香港教育工作者聯會黃楚標中學
- Simplified Chinese: 香港教育工作者联会黄楚标中学
Transcriptions
Standard Mandarin
- Hanyu Pinyin: Xiānggǎng Jiàoyùgōngzuòzhě Lián Huì Huáng Chǔbiāo Zhōngxué
Yue: Cantonese
- Jyutping: Hoeng^{1} gong^{2} gaau^{3} juk^{6} gung^{1} zok^{3} ze^{2} lyun^{4} wui^{6} wong^{4} co^{2} biu^{1} zung^{1} hok^{6}

HKFEW Wong Cho Bau Secondary School is an aided secondary school in Hong Kong. Founded in September 2003, the school is fully subsidized by Government of Hong Kong. Most subjects of the school are taught in Chinese. Situated in Fu Tung Estate, Tung Chung, New Territories near Tung Chung station, the grammar school had 65 teachers, as of 2016. Established by Hong Kong Federation of Education Workers, the school is the only secondary school governed by the teachers union.

== List of principals ==
| Name | Years in office |
|---|---|
| Jenny Chung Sin-ling | 2003–2016 |
| Chow Yu-fai | 2016–2017 |
| Hui Chun-lung | 2017–Present |

== House system ==
Admitted students of the school will be allocated into the four houses on an equal footing. The house that they belong to remains the same until they graduate or drop out. There are four houses in the school and each of them is led by two teachers, also serving as its advisers.

== Class structure and curriculum ==
=== Past curriculum ===
Prior to 2008, there were 27 classes in the school:

| Year | Classes |
|---|---|
| Secondary 1 | 5 |
| Secondary 2 | 5 |
| Secondary 3 | 5 |
| Secondary 4 | 5 (including 3 liberal arts and business classes, 2 science classes) |
| Secondary 5 | 5 (including 3 liberal arts and business classes, 2 science classes) |
| Secondary 6 | 2 (including 1 liberal arts and business class, 1 science class) |

Secondary 1 to Secondary 3 students were offered a broad and balanced curriculum, focusing on languages, liberal arts, business and science. The best-performing 40 students would be placed in class A, while other students would be distributed to other four classes.

The classes were divided into two disciplines throughout the senior form. Within all Secondary 4 to Secondary 5 classes, three of them were liberal arts and business classes, the remainder was science classes.

The students need to take part in Hong Kong Certificate of Education Examination (HKCEE) at the end of Secondary 5. If they did not pass the examination, they would have to apply for repeating Secondary 5 in the school or other schools.

Curriculum was broadened in Secondary 6. New courses, including Use of English, Chinese Language and Culture, Advanced Supplementary (AS) and Advanced Level (AL) subjects, were added to Secondary 6 curriculum.

=== Current curriculum ===
Senior form students in the academic year of 2009/2010 was offered a brand-new curriculum after implementation of the education reform. Apart from languages, liberal arts, business and science courses, new courses like Mathematics, Liberal Studies, Geography, Visual Arts and Information and Communication Technology were added to the curriculum.

== Notable alumni ==
- Nathan Law Kwun-chung, former member of the Legislative Council and chairman of Demosistō

== See also ==
- Hong Kong Federation of Education Workers
- Education in Hong Kong
- List of secondary schools in Hong Kong
- List of schools in Hong Kong
