= Nixie Lam =

Hong Kong politician (born 1982)

The Honourable Nixie Lam
- 林琳
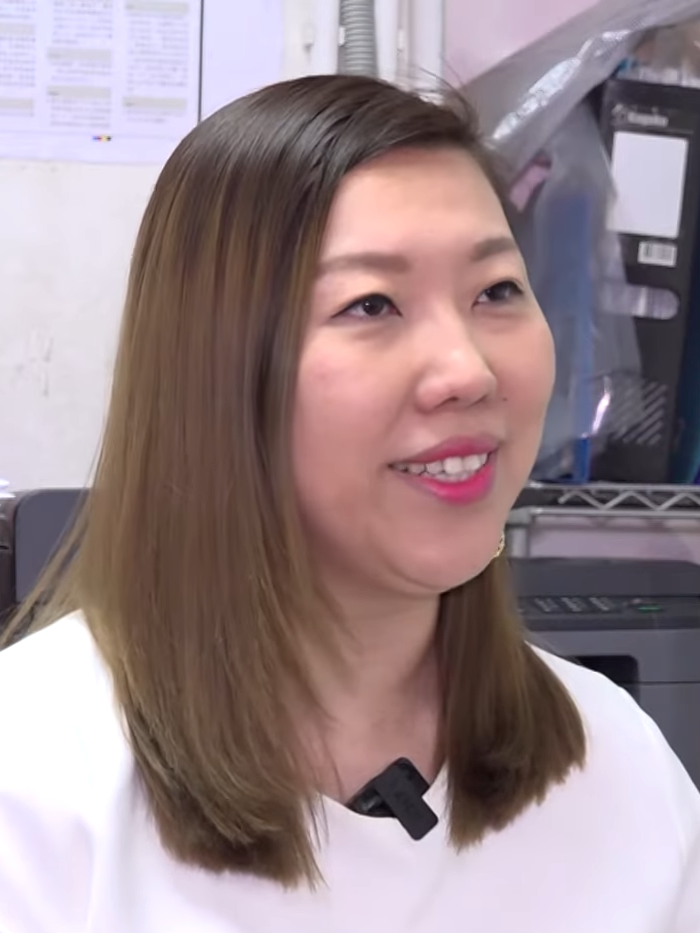

Member of the Legislative Council
- Incumbent
- Assumed office 1 January 2022
- Constituency: Election Committee

Member of the Tsuen Wan District Council
- In office 1 January 2012 – 31 December 2019
- Preceded by: Albert Chan
- Succeeded by: Angus Yick Shing-chung
- Constituency: Tsuen Wan West (since 2015); Lai Hing (until 2015)

Personal details
- Born: March 13, 1982 (age 44)
- Citizenship: Chinese (Hong Kong)
- Party: DAB

Nixie Lam
- Chinese: 林琳
Transcriptions
Standard Mandarin
- Hanyu Pinyin: Lín Lín
Yue: Cantonese
- Jyutping: lam4 lam4

Nixie Lam Lam (Chinese: 林琳, born 13 March 1982) is a Hong Kong politician of the DAB. Before returned as one of the Election Committee constituency Legislative Council members in the 2021 Hong Kong legislative election, she was a member of the Tsuen Wan District Council from 2012 to 2019.

She was re-elected as Legislative Councilor in 2025 through the same constituency.

== Personal life ==
On 5 January 2022, Carrie Lam announced new warnings and restrictions against social gathering due to potential COVID-19 outbreaks. One day later, it was discovered that Lam attended a birthday party hosted by Witman Hung Wai-man, with 222 guests. At least one guest tested positive with COVID-19, causing all guests to be quarantined. Lam was warned by Legislative Council president Andrew Leung to not attend any meetings until after finishing her last mandatory Covid-19 test on 22 January 2022. However, she decided to attend the meeting on 19 January 2022, against Leung's orders.

In November 2022, Lam was tested positive for COVID-19.

== Electoral history ==
2021 legislative election: Election Committee
No.	Candidates	Affiliation	Votes	%
1	Luk Chung-hung	FTU	1,178	
2	Ma Fung-kwok	New Forum	1,234	
3	Kingsley Wong Kwok	FTU	1,192	
4	Chan Hoi-yan	Nonpartisan	1,292	
5	Tang Fei	FEW	1,339	
6	Michael John Treloar Rowse	Nonpartisan	454	
7	Paul Tse Wai-chun	Independent	1,283	
8	Diu Sing-hung	Nonpartisan	342	
9	Tseng Chin-i	Nonpartisan	919	
10	Nelson Lam Chi-yuen	Nonpartisan	970	
11	Peter Douglas Koon Ho-ming	Nonpartisan	1,102	
12	Andrew Lam Siu-lo	Nonpartisan	1,026	
13	Chow Man-kong	Nonpartisan	1,060	
14	Doreen Kong Yuk-foon	Nonpartisan	1,032	
15	Fung Wai-kwong	Nonpartisan	708	
16	Chan Yuet-ming	Nonpartisan	1,187	
17	Simon Hoey Lee	Nonpartisan	1,308	
18	Judy Kapui Chan	NPP	1,284	
19	Wong Chi-him	Nonpartisan	956	
20	Maggie Chan Man-ki	Nonpartisan	1,331	
21	So Cheung-wing	Nonpartisan	1,013	
22	Sun Dong	Nonpartisan	1,124	
23	Tu Hai-ming	Nonpartisan	834	
24	Tan Yueheng	Nonpartisan	1,245	
25	Ng Kit-chong	Nonpartisan	1,239	
26	Chan Siu-hung	Nonpartisan	1,239	
27	Hong Wen	Nonpartisan	1,142	
28	Dennis Lam Shun-chiu	Nonpartisan	1,157	
29	Rock Chen Chung-nin	DAB	1,297	
30	Yung Hoi-yan	NPP/CF	1,313	
31	Chan Pui-leung	Nonpartisan	1,205	
32	Lau Chi-pang	Nonpartisan	1,214	
33	Carmen Kan Wai-mun	Nonpartisan	1,291	
34	Nixie Lam Lam	DAB	1,181	
35	Luk Hon-man	BPA	1,059	
36	Elizabeth Quat	DAB	1,322	
37	Lilian Kwok Ling-lai	DAB	1,122	
38	Lai Tung-kwok	NPP	1,237	
39	Leung Mei-fun	BPA/KWND	1,348	
40	Ho Kwan-yiu	Nonpartisan	1,263	
41	Chan Hoi-wing	DAB	941	
42	Alice Mak Mei-kuen	FTU	1,326	
43	Kevin Sun Wei-yung	Independent	891	
44	Stephen Wong Yuen-shan	Nonpartisan	1,305	
45	Lee Chun-keung	Liberal	1,060	
46	Cheung Kwok-kwan	DAB	1,342	
47	Kenneth Leung Yuk-wai	Nonpartisan	1,160	
48	Allan Zeman	Nonpartisan	955	
49	Lam Chun-sing	FLU	1,002	
50	Charles Ng Wang-wai	Nonpartisan	958	
51	Choy Wing-keung	FTU	818	

2019 local elections at the Tsuen Wan District Council: Tsuen Wan West
Party	Candidate	Votes	%	±%
Democratic	Angus Yick Shing-chung	4,718	61.85	N/A
DAB	Nixie Lam Lam	2,910	38.15	−13.63
Majority		1,808	23.70	
Turnout		7,657	80.27	+26.57
Democratic gain from DAB		Swing		

2015 local elections at the Tsuen Wan District Council: Tsuen Wan West
Party	Candidate	Votes	%	±%
Independent	Chu Shun-ming	793	16.68	N/A
DAB	Nixie Lam Lam	2,462	51.78	+0.81
Independent	Poon Chiu-lam	1,500	31.55	N/A
Majority		962	20.23	
Turnout		4,843	53.7	
DAB hold		Swing		

2011 local elections at the Tsuen Wan District Council: Lai Hing
Party	Candidate	Votes	%	±%
DAB	Nixie Lam Lam	1,965	50.97	+17.0
People Power	Jacqueline Chan So-ling	1,045	27.11	N/A
Liberal	Au Ming-sze	845	21.92	N/A
Majority		960	23.87	
DAB gain from People Power		Swing		

Legislative Council of Hong Kong
New constituency	Member of Legislative Council; Representative for Election Committee; 2022–present	Incumbent
