= Adrian Ho =

Hong Kong politician and businessman

The Honourable Adrian Ho
- 何敬康
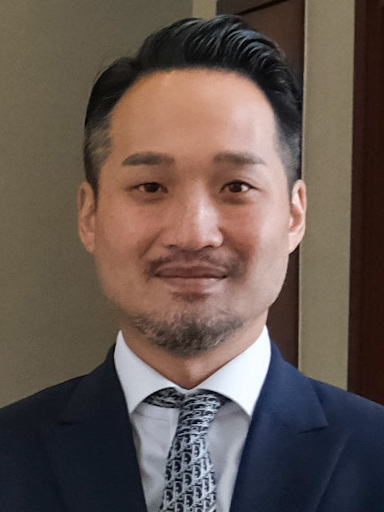

Member of the Legislative Council
- Incumbent
- Assumed office 19 December 2022
- Preceded by: Alice Mak
- Constituency: Election Committee

Personal details
- Born: 1977 (age 48–49) Hong Kong
- Party: New People's Party
- Parent: Ho Hao Veng (father)
- Relatives: Ho Yin (paternal grandfather); Edmund Ho Hau Wah (paternal uncle); Justin Ho King Man (cousin); Charmaine Ho Mei Chee (cousin)
- Education: Wharton School of Business

Adrian Pedro Ho King-hong (Chinese: 何敬康; born 1977) is a Hong Kong politician and businessman. In 2022, he was elected to the Legislative Council as an election committee constituency member.

== Early life and education ==
Ho was born into a politically well-connected family from Macau. His paternal uncle is former Chief Executive of Macau Edmund Ho. After attending La Salle Primary School in Hong Kong, Ho continued his education in the UK at Repton. He graduated from Wharton School of Business at the University of Pennsylvania in the US.

== Politics ==
In 2019, Ho founded a pro-beijing Facebook group “SaveHK” which became the largest group with 200,000 members at one point. The group was suspended by Meta in late 2022. After four incumbent members of the LegCo resigned in June 2022 to join the Lee administration, by-elections were held on 18 December to fill in the remaining seats. Ho won a seat as member of the New People's Party in the election committee constituency with 833 votes.

In January 2022, Ho argued that "It is an undemocratic act in and of itself, to attempt to measure or quantify democracy" and said that "The Chinese approach to democracy is pragmatic, and Hong Kong must shake off its belief in the 'fantasy of Western-style democracy'."

In October 2022, Ho said that General Secretary of the Chinese Communist Party Xi Jinping made an "ingenious speech" and said that the city had "successfully navigated through such political turmoil, with the enactment of the National Security Law and the reform of the electoral system - transitioning from chaos to governance and ushering in a new era of prosperity."

In December 2022, Ho said that Hong Kong's most deep-rooted problem was Hongkongers' lack of national identity.

In December 2022, the NPCSC ruled that the Hong Kong government could block foreign lawyers from defending national security cases, after Jimmy Lai attempted to hire Tim Owen. In January 2023, Ho said that "interpreting the law to clarify the original intent and purpose of ensuring a sound and effective legal system and enforcement mechanism for safeguarding national security is entirely justified, necessary, and timely."

In May 2023, after the government reduced the amount of democratically elected seats in the District Councils, Ho said the changes "will undoubtedly be advantageous to Hong Kong residents."

In March 2024, Ho said that "Press freedom will be bolstered, not diminished, by Article 23."

== Endorsements ==
Ho has publicly endorsed the 2022 Beijing Winter Olympics and the 2022 Hong Kong Gay Games.

Legislative Council of Hong Kong
Preceded by Alice Mak	Member of Legislative Council; Representative for Election Committee; 2022–present	Incumbent
