= Ching Oi (constituency) =

Constituency in Wong Tai Sin District, Hong Kong

- Elected constituency for the Wong Tai Sin District Council
- Boundary of Ching Oi in Wong Tai Sin District
- District: Wong Tai Sin
- Legislative Council constituency: Kowloon Central
- Population: 20,665 (2019)
- Electorate: 12,864 (2019)

Current constituency
- Created: 1999
- Number of members: One
- Member: (Vacant)

Ching Oi
- Traditional Chinese: 正愛
Transcriptions
Yue: Cantonese
- Yale Romanization: Jing oi
- Jyutping: Zing3 oi3

Ching Oi is one of the 25 constituencies in the Wong Tai Sin District in Hong Kong. The constituency returns one district councillor to the Wong Tai Sin District Council, with an election every four years.

The constituency has an estimated population of 20,665.

== Councillors represented ==
Election	Member	Party
2003	Maggie Chan Man-ki	DAB
2007	Maggie Chan Man-ki	DAB
2011	Maggie Chan Man-ki	DAB
2015	Maggie Chan Man-ki	DAB→Independent
2019	Sham Yu-hin→vacant	TWSCP

== Election results ==
=== 2010s ===
Wong Tai Sin District Council Election, 2019: Ching Oi
Party	Candidate	Votes	%	±%
TWSCP	Sham Yu-hin	5,764	61.10	
DAB	Poon Cheuk-bun	3,670	38.90	
Majority		2,094	22.20	
Turnout		9,466	73.61	
TWSCP gain from DAB		Swing		
