= 123 Democratic Alliance =

123 Democratic Alliance 一二三民主聯盟
- Founder: Yum Sin-ling
- Founded: 20 March 1994
- Dissolved: 3 December 2000
- Ideology: Liberalism (HK); Conservatism (Taiwan); Anti-communism (HK); Three Principles of the People
- Political position: Centre-right to right-wing
- Regional affiliation: Pro-Taiwan camp Pro-democracy camp

123 Democratic Alliance (Chinese: 一二三民主聯盟) was a pro-Republic of China political party in Hong Kong. Established in 1994 by a group of pro-Taiwan, pro-democracy and pro-business politicians. It remained a small party until it was dissolved in 2000 due to the lack of financial support from the Taiwan government, after the Kuomintang's defeat in the presidential election.

== History ==
The party was formed by the supporters of the Kuomintang government on Taiwan in 1994. It was represented by Sin Ling Yum in the Legislative Council of Hong Kong (LegCo) from 1995 to 1997. It was excluded from the Provisional Legislative Council, the interim body which largely controlled by the Beijing government. All candidates were defeated in the 1998 LegCo elections.

The party won six seats in the 1999 District Council elections. Due to lack of funding, the party did not file any candidates in the 2000 LegCo elections (although some of the losers continued to take part as independent participants or supporters of other parties), and was subsequently dissolved on 3 December 2000 due to the lack of financial support from the Taiwan government. The last chairman of the alliance was Tai Cheuk-yin.

== Election performance ==
=== Legislative Council elections ===
Election	Number of popular votes	% of popular votes	GC seats	FC seats	EC seats	Total seats	+/−
1995	–	–	0	0	1	1 / 60	—N/a
1998	3,050	0.21	0	0	0	0 / 60	—N/a

=== Municipal elections ===
Election	Number of popular votes	% of popular votes	UrbCo seats	RegCo seats	Total elected seats
1995	7,916	1.42	0	0	0 / 59

=== District Council elections ===
Election	Number of popular votes	% of popular votes	Total elected seats	+/−
1994	15,527	2.26	6 / 346	0
1999	11,396▼	1.41▼	6 / 390	0
