= Lam Chun-sing =

Hong Kong politician

The Honourable Lam Chun-sing
- 林振昇
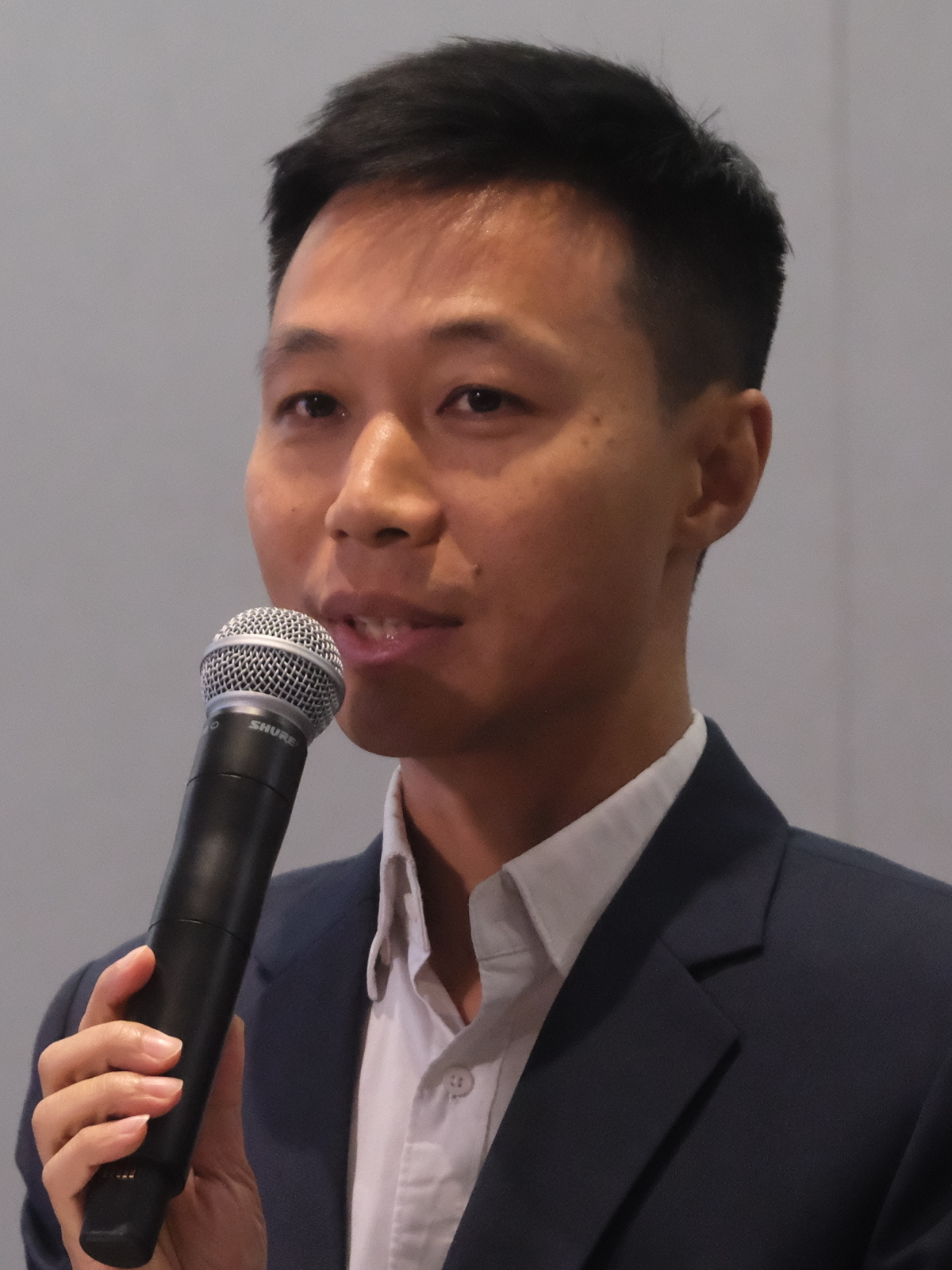
- Lam in 2024

Member of the Legislative Council of Hong Kong
- Incumbent
- Assumed office 1 January 2022
- Preceded by: New constituency
- Constituency: Election Committee

Personal details
- Born: 1981
- Party: Federation of Hong Kong and Kowloon Labour Unions
- Education: Chinese University of Hong Kong (BA); Hong Kong Institute of Education; Tsinghua University (MPA)

Lam Chun-sing (Chinese: 林振昇; born 1981) is a Hong Kong trade unionist and politician who has been a member of the Legislative Council of Hong Kong from the Election Committee constituency since 2022, as a member of the Federation of Hong Kong and Kowloon Labour Unions. He was the chair of the Federation of Hong Kong and Kowloon Labour Unions and is a member of the pro-Beijing camp.

== Early life and education ==
Lam graduated with a bachelor of arts degree in history programme from the Chinese University of Hong Kong in 2003, and conducted postgraduate studies at the Education University of Hong Kong in 2004, and from Tsinghua University with a Master of Public Administration degree. Chun-sing became a trade union official in 2004.

== Career ==
Lam was a candidate in the 2011 Hong Kong local elections.

In the 2021 election, he won a seat in the Legislative Council of Hong Kong from the Election Committee constituency. He was the chair of the Federation of Hong Kong and Kowloon Labour Unions until 2017.

During his tenure on the legislative council he has been a member of the House, Finance, Personall Establishment, and Education committees. He is the president of the Manpower committee.

== Personal life ==
Lam practices Buddhism.

== Political positions ==
Lam is a member of the pro-Beijing camp in the Legislative Council of Hong Kong. He supports stricter legislation regarding labour union protests stating that "a lot of labour union stagged strikes that were unrelated to labour relations" during the 2019–2020 Hong Kong protests.

== Works cited ==
=== News ===
- "Lin Zhensheng believes that devoting himself to the work of the Federation of Labor is an important and correct choice in life". Jianliao. 11 June 2024. Archived from the original on 5 July 2025.
- "One article shows all 786 nominations for John Lee". Hong Kong Economic Journal. 13 April 2025. Archived from the original on 5 July 2025.
- Leung, Hillary (25 February 2025). "Hong Kong lawmakers support new union laws, citing labour groups' political acts during 2019 protests". South China Morning Post.
- Lin, Edith (12 March 2025). "Hong Kong union calls on Deliveroo to clarify staff arrangements after closure". South China Morning Post. Archived from the original on 1 June 2025.

=== Web ===
- "Legislative Council General Election results: Election Committee constituency". Hong Kong. Archived from the original on 17 February 2025.
- "Members database". Legislative Council of Hong Kong. Archived from the original on 4 July 2025.
- "Mr. Lam Chun Sing". Lam Chun-sing. Archived from the original on 5 July 2025.

Legislative Council of Hong Kong
New constituency	Member of Legislative Council; Representative for Election Committee; 2022–present	Incumbent
