= Ng Ching-fai =

Chinese academic and politician (born 1939)

Ng Ching-fai, GBS (simplified Chinese: 吴清辉; traditional Chinese: 吳清輝; pinyin: Wú Qīnghuī; Jyutping: Ng4 Ching1 Fai1; born 20 November 1939 in Shanghai, China) is a professor of chemistry and the former president and vice-chancellor of Hong Kong Baptist University and the president of United International College.

Before he became the president and vice-chancellor of HKBU, Ng was the dean of the faculty of science of the university and a member of the Hong Kong Legislative Council from July 1997 to July 2001.

Ng also serves as a member of the National People's Congress of the People's Republic of China. Ng was awarded the Gold Bauhinia Star (GBS) order by the Hong Kong government on 1 July 2005.

He attended the University of Melbourne and earned a PhD degree at the University of British Columbia.

Legislative Council of Hong Kong
New parliament	Member of Provisional Legislative Council; 1997–1998	Replaced by Legislative Council
New parliament	Member of Legislative Council; Representative for Election Committee; 1998–2001	Succeeded by Ma Fung-kwok
Academic offices
Preceded by Daniel Tse	President and Vice-Chancellor of the Hong Kong Baptist University; 2001–2010	Succeeded by Albert Chan
Order of precedence
Preceded by Yip Wai-jane; Recipients of the Gold Bauhinia Star	Hong Kong order of precedence Recipients of the Gold Bauhinia Star	Succeeded by Yeoh Eng-kiong; Recipients of the Gold Bauhinia Star
