= Johnny Ng =

Hong Kong politician

The Honourable Johnny Ng
- 吳傑莊
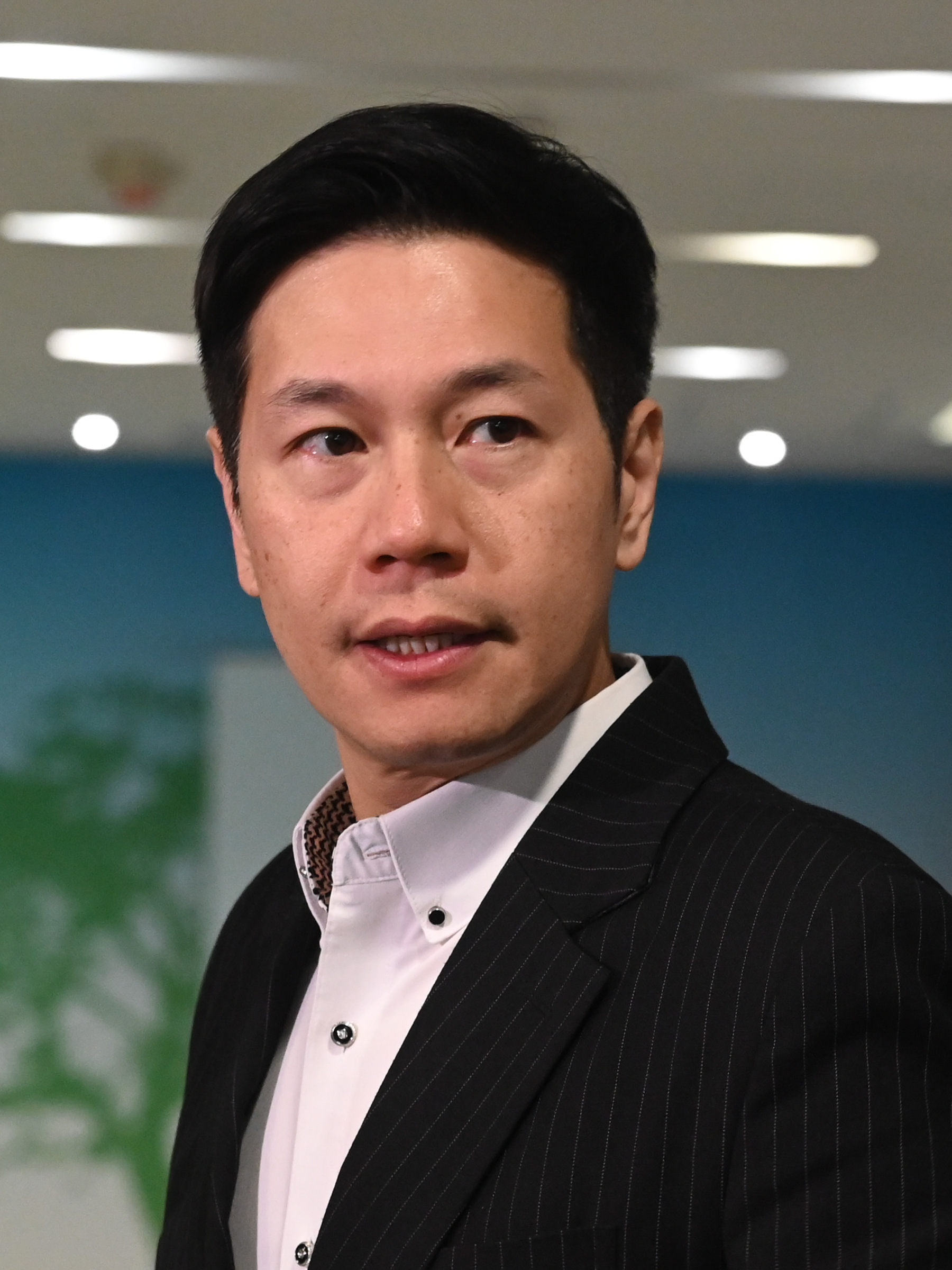
- Ng in 2024

Member of Chinese People’s Political Consultative Conference
- Incumbent
- Assumed office January 24, 2018

Member of the Legislative Council
- Incumbent
- Assumed office January 1, 2022
- Constituency: Election Committee

Personal details
- Born: 1974 (age 51–52)
- Education: Hong Kong Polytechnic University (Ph.D.); Tsinghua University (Postdoc)

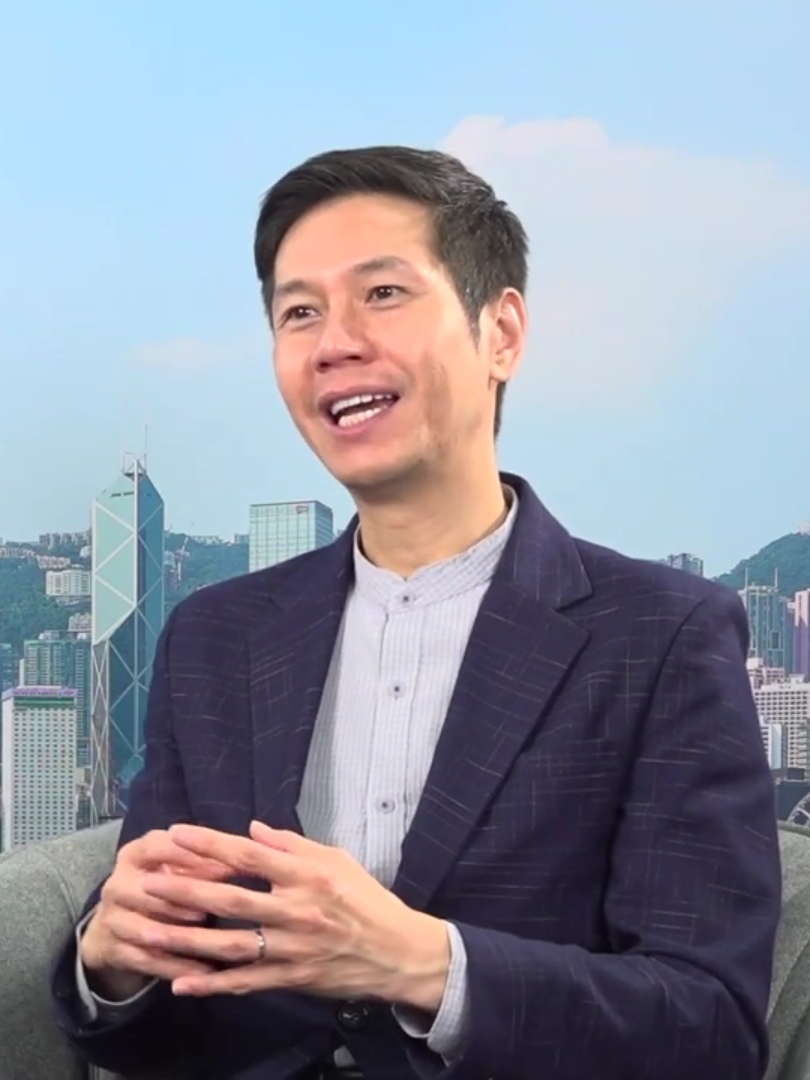
Ng being interviewed

Johnny Ng Kit-chong, MH, JP (Chinese: 吳傑莊, born 1974) is a Hong Kong politician. Ng has been a member of the National Committee of the Chinese People's Political Consultative Conference since 2018 and being elected as a member of the seventh Legislative Council in 2021, elected from the Election Committee. He was re-elected in 2025 through the same constituency.

Ng has also been appointed as an Independent Director, serving on the boards of China Unicom as well as Chuang's China.

Ng previously served as a Council Member of the Baptist University, member of Advisory Committee of Arts Development, member of Employees Retraining Board, Past Chairman of Hong Kong Youth United Association, Honorary Chairman of YELITES.

In 2010, Ng established the "Hong Kong Youth Synergy Foundation Ltd." and has since served as its convener.

== Early life and education ==
Ng spent his early childhood in a subdivided flat in Yau Ma Tei before moving to public housing in Tuen Mun's Tai Hing Estate with his father and sister. In 1993, Ng enrolled at the Hong Kong Polytechnic to study Manufacturing Engineering. Ng graduated from the Hong Kong Polytechnic University with a Bachelor of Engineering and a Doctor of Philosophy. He then completed postdoctoral research at Tsinghua University in Beijing, China in 2006, specializing in computer science and technology.

== Career ==
=== Political career ===
In the Election Committee subsection elections, Ng Kit Chong was elected with 75 votes in the Performing Arts Sub-subsector of Sports, Performing Arts, Culture and Publication.

In December 2021, Ng was elected as Legislative Councilor through election committee constituency with 1,239 votes.

In August 2024, Ng said that Hong Kong's high housing costs would not hinder its ambitions to become a tech hub, saying "We don't have to lower our prices to accommodate others. We should attract people who are more capable."

He was recently appointed as the Chairman of the "Subcommittee on Issues Relating to the Development of Web3 and Virtual Assets" within the Legislative Council.

In December 2025, Ng was re-elected as Legislative Councilor through the same constituency with 1,331 votes.

=== Business career ===
According to Ng's January 2022 declaration of assets, he owns shares in about 40 different companies.

Beyond his community roles, Ng is also the Chairman of Goldford Group, a position he has held since 1999.

Following the September 11 attacks, Ng established a company focusing on biometric identification and information security technology. Ng's company developed technology that was later implemented at border checkpoints in Hong Kong and Shenzhen, China. In 2008, the company's technology was utilized during the opening and closing ceremonies of the 2008 Summer Olympics held at Beijing, China.

Ng also serves as the Non-Executive Chairman of the G-Rocket International Accelerator. He also spearheaded the launch of the Web3 Hub@Cyberport in January 2023.

== Personal life ==
Beyond his professional pursuits, Ng is interested in horse racing. He is involved with several racehorses with Hong Kong Jockey Club, either as the sole owner, syndicate member, or syndicate manager.

On 5 January 2022, Carrie Lam announced new warnings and restrictions against social gathering due to potential COVID-19 outbreaks. One day later, it was discovered that Ng attended a birthday party hosted by Witman Hung Wai-man, with 222 guests on 3 January 2022. At least one guest tested positive with COVID-19, causing many guests to be quarantined. In April 2022, Ng participated in COVID-19 Vaccination Activities held in Wong Tai Sin District. The event saw 450 individuals receive the Sinovac vaccine, with participants including both elderly residents and children. In October 2022, Ng was tested positive for COVID-19.

Ng has adopted a two-year-old British Shorthair cat. Ng has become an advocate for animal rights, particularly focusing on pet-related issues. He has been promoting the concept of "pet easy passage" and has urged the Hong Kong government to accelerate feasibility studies for implementing RNATT (Rabies Neutralizing Antibody Titer Test) and home quarantine policies for pets.

Ng was awarded "Ten Outstanding Digi Youth" in 2000.

Legislative Council of Hong Kong
New constituency	Member of Legislative Council; Representative for Election Committee; 2022–present	Incumbent
