= Choy Kan-pui =

Hong Kong politician

Choy Kan-pui 蔡根培 BBS, JP

Member of the Provisional Legislative Council
- In office 25 January 1997 – 30 June 1998

Member of the Legislative Council
- In office 1 October 1995 – 30 June 1997
- Preceded by: New seat
- Succeeded by: abolished
- Constituency: Election Committee

Personal details
- Born: 5 August 1929 (age 96) Hong Kong
- Party: HKAS (1980s–1991); UDHK (1991–93); Civil Force (1993–present); HKPA (1990s)
- Spouse(s): Wai Shui-yung; Tsang Fook Tai
- Occupation: Company Director

Choy Kan-pui
- Chinese: 蔡根培
Transcriptions
Standard Mandarin
- Hanyu Pinyin: Cài Gēnpéi
Yue: Cantonese
- Jyutping: coi3 gan1 pui4

Choy Kan-pui, BBS, JP (born 1929) is a former Hong Kong legislator and Sha Tin villager. He ran in the 1982 Hong Kong district boards election representing the Tin Sum village in Sha Tin where he rooted and continued his office until 2003. He was also the chairman of the Sha Tin District Council.

He was a member of the Hong Kong Affairs Society, a pro-democracy political group in the 1980s, which later became the United Democrats of Hong Kong (UDHK), the first major pro-democracy party. Choy was a founding member of the UDHK, but he and Lau Kong-wah soon left the party and formed a local community organisation Civil Force. He was elected as member of the Legislative Council in Election Committee in the 1995 Legislative Council election in which the electorates were composed of district councillors. He later joined the pro-Beijing pro-business Hong Kong Progressive Alliance (HKPA) and was re-elected to the Provisional Legislative Council in 1996. In the 2000 Legislative Council election, HKPA supported Choy Kan-pui and Tang Siu-tong to participate in the New Territories East and New Territories West constituencies respectively but Choy failed to regain a seat in LegCo.

He is currently a member of the Heung Yee Kuk.

Political offices
Preceded by Ng Chan-lam	Chairman of the Sha Tin District Board; 1991–1999	Succeeded by Wai Kwok-hung
Legislative Council of Hong Kong
New constituency	Member of Legislative Council; Representative for Election Committee; 1995–1997	Replaced by Provisional Legislative Council
New parliament	Member of Provisional Legislative Council; 1997–1998	Replaced by Legislative Council
