= Ambrose Lau =

Hong Kong politician

Ambrose Lau Hon-chuen
- Traditional Chinese: 劉漢銓
- Simplified Chinese: 刘汉铨
Transcriptions
Standard Mandarin
- Hanyu Pinyin: Liú Hànquán
- Wade–Giles: Liu^{2} Han^{4}-chʻüan^{2}
Yue: Cantonese
- Jyutping: lau4 hon3 cyun4

Ambrose Lau Hon-chuen GBS JP (Chinese: 劉漢銓) (born 16 July 1947) was the chairman of the Hong Kong Progressive Alliance (HKPA), a pro-business and Pro-Beijing political party in Hong Kong.

He was a member of the Legislative Council of Hong Kong (LegCo), elected from the constituency of Election Committee. He is a solicitor and notary public. He served as the chairman of the Central and Western District Board from 1988 to 1994, and as President of the Law Society of Hong Kong from 1992 to 1993.

== Academic history ==
- LLB, University of London

Political offices
Preceded by Vincent Ko Hon-chiu	Chairman of Central and Western District Board; 1988–1994	Succeeded by Yuen Bun-keung
Legal offices
Preceded by Alfred Donald Yap	President of Law Society of Hong Kong; 1992–1993	Succeeded by Roderick Woo
Legislative Council of Hong Kong
New constituency	Member of Legislative Council; Representative for Election Committee; 1995–1997	Replaced by Provisional Legislative Council
New parliament	Member of Provisional Legislative Council; 1997–1998	Replaced by Legislative Council
New parliament	Member of Legislative Council; Representative for Election Committee; 1998–2004	Constituency abolished
Party political offices
New political party	Chairman of the Hong Kong Progressive Alliance; 1997–2005	Merged with DAB
Order of precedence
Preceded by James Tien; Recipients of the Gold Bauhinia Star	Hong Kong order of precedence Recipients of the Gold Bauhinia Star	Succeeded by Michael Wong; Recipients of the Gold Bauhinia Star
