= David Chu (Hong Kong politician) =

David Chu Yu-lin
- 朱幼麟

Member of the Legislative Council of Hong Kong
- In office 11 October 1995 – 30 June 1997
- Preceded by: New constituency
- Succeeded by: Replaced by Provisional Legislative Council
- Constituency: Election Committee
- In office 21 December 1996 – 30 June 1998 (Provisional Legislative Council)
- In office 1 July 1998 – 30 September 2004
- Preceded by: New parliament
- Succeeded by: Constituency abolished
- Constituency: Election Committee

Personal details
- Born: 5 March 1944 (age 82) Shanghai, China
- Party: Democratic Alliance for the Betterment and Progress of Hong Kong
- Other political affiliations: Liberal Democratic Federation of Hong Kong (until 1999); Hong Kong Progressive Alliance (1999–2005)
- Spouse: Chu Ho Miu-hing
- Children: Ann Chu Kwok-on; Chu Kwok-chuen
- Education: Northeastern University; Harvard University
- Occupation: Managing director

David Chu Yu-lin
- Chinese: 朱幼麟
Transcriptions
Standard Mandarin
- Hanyu Pinyin: Zhū Yòulín
Yue: Cantonese
- Yale Romanization: Jyū Yauleùhn
- Jyutping: zyu1 jau3leon4

David Chu Yu-lin (born 5 March 1944) is a Hong Kong politician. He was one of the founding members of the Hong Kong Progressive Alliance (HKPA), a forerunner of the Democratic Alliance for the Betterment and Progress of Hong Kong (DAB), and has been a member of the Legislative Council of Hong Kong as well as the National People's Congress of the People's Republic of China.

== Early life ==
Chu was born in Shanghai in 1944. He moved to the United States in 1958 with his parents. The family settled in Bedford, Massachusetts, and Chu would go on to naturalise as a US citizen. He graduated from Cambridge High and Latin School in 1962. He continued his education at Northeastern University, where he earned an undergraduate degree in mechanical engineering and a Master of Business Administration. His employer sent him to Hong Kong on assignment in 1977, and he chose to settle there.

== In government and politics ==
Chu held positions in a number of government bodies soon after his arrival in Hong Kong, the earliest as a member of the Hong Kong Auxiliary Police Force from 1982 to 1985. He was named a Hong Kong Affairs Advisor to the Central People's Government of the People's Republic of China in 1992.

In 1996, Chu was chosen as a member of the Provisional Legislative Council. In 1997, he was named a Hong Kong deputy to the 9th National People's Congress. In the 1998 LegCo election, he ran as a candidate in the Election Committee functional constituency, and was elected with 469 votes, the fifth-highest out of ten candidates. In the 2000 LegCo election, he was returned to the same seat with 464 votes, again the fifth-highest out of the ten candidates. In 2003, he was reappointed a Hong Kong deputy to the 10th National People's Congress.

In July 2004, as the end of Chu's LegCo term neared and the Election Committee constituency was scheduled to be abolished, he spoke out against the slow progress towards democratisation in Hong Kong, calling Beijing's announcement that the 2007 Chief Executive election would not employ universal suffrage "unfortunate". He considered running as a candidate for the New Territories East geographical constituency in the 2004 LegCo election. However, the pro-Beijing camp pressed stronger HKPA candidates to drop out of the race so as not to split the vote and spoil DAB candidates' chances of election in the same constituencies; instead, Tso Wung-Wai ran as the HKPA candidate in Chu's place, and lost badly, ensuring the victory of DAB candidates Lau Kong-wah and Li Kwok-ying.

Chu stood as a candidate to be returned to the 11th National People's Congress in January 2008, but did not gain enough support; along with Philip Wong, he was one of two former Hong Kong deputies who failed to retain their seats.

== Personal life ==
In his spare time, he enjoys cave diving and paragliding. He is married to Ho Miu-hing (何妙馨), the daughter of Hang Seng Bank co-founder Ho Tim (何添). They have two children and live in Repulse Bay.

Chu renounced US citizenship in June 1994. After his renunciation, he placed his cancelled United States passport in a time capsule and held a public burial ceremony for it.

Legislative Council of Hong Kong
New constituency	Member of Legislative Council; Representative for Election Committee; 1995–1997	Replaced by Provisional Legislative Council
New parliament	Member of Provisional Legislative Council; 1997–1998	Replaced by Legislative Council
New parliament	Member of Legislative Council; Representative for Election Committee; 1998–2004	Constituency eliminated
