= Maggie Chan (politician) =

Politician from Hong Kong

The Honourable Maggie Chan
- 陳曼琪
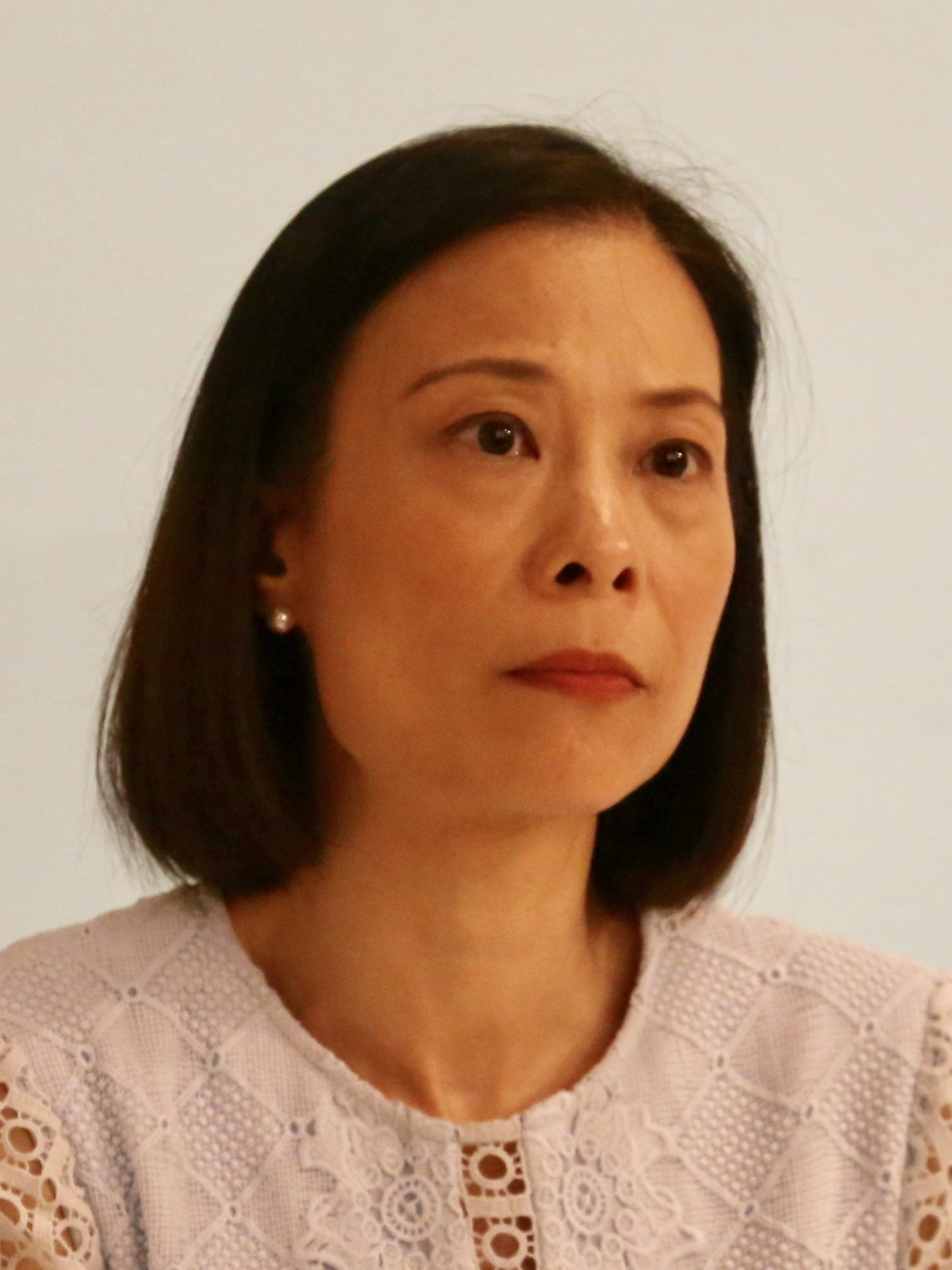
- Chan in 2019

Member of the Legislative Council
- Incumbent
- Assumed office 1 January 2022
- Preceded by: New constituency
- Constituency: Election Committee

Deputy to the National People's Congress
- Incumbent
- Assumed office 5 March 2018
- Constituency: Hong Kong

Personal details
- Born: 3 February 1969 (age 57) Hong Kong
- Education: University of Hong Kong (LLB)
- Occupation: Politician; Lawyer

Maggie Chan Man-ki, MH, JP (Chinese: 陳曼琪; born 3 February 1969) is a Hong Kong solicitor and politician. She was a member of the Wong Tai Sin District Council for Ching Oi from 2004 to 2019 and has been a Hong Kong deputy to the National People's Congress (NPC) since 2017. She is a member of the Legislative Council since 2022.

== Biography ==
Chan was graduated from the University of Hong Kong with Bachelor of Laws in 1991. She was admitted as solicitor in October 1994 and has since practiced law and has become a senior partner of CMK Lawyers in 2019.

She was first elected to the Wong Tai Sin District Council for Ching Oi constituency as a member of the Democratic Alliance for the Betterment of Hong Kong (DAB). She quit the DAB in January 2016, citing her busy work with the Small and Medium Law Firms Association. She decided not to seek for re-election in 2019 in the wake of a pro-democracy landslide where her seat was taken by localist Eddie Sham.

Chan had been appointed to many public offices by the government, including member of the Town Planning Board from 2006 to 2012, council member of the City University of Hong Kong from 2007 to 2013, member of the Equal Opportunities Commission from 2007 to 2013 and council member of the Lingnan University from 2015 to 2021 among others. When she was appointed to the council of the Lingnan University by Chief Executive Leung Chun-ying in 2015, it was strongly protested by the students.

Chan rose to prominence when she represented the minibus drivers' group during the 2014 Occupy protests to obtain and deliver court injunction prohibiting occupiers from erecting obstructions at protest site in Mong Kok, which triggered the clearance of the occupying site in November 2014, marking the beginning of the end of the historic protests. In 2016, Chan supported the Companies Registry decision to refuse the application of pro-independence Hong Kong National Party as she claimed that advocating Hong Kong independence was an illegal activity according to the Crimes Ordinances Sections 9 and 10.

She was first elected as Hong Kong deputy to the National People's Congress (NPC) in 2017 and was an ex officio member of the Election Committee. She was a leading advocate for implementing the national security law in Hong Kong in 2020 by directly putting the clauses into the Annex III of the Basic Law of Hong Kong, bypassing the local legislation process, which was eventually adopted by Beijing.

In January 2022, after elected as a member of the Legislative Council, Chan voiced concerns over the slow progress on legislation to regulate donations and crowd-funding, which were used by pro-democracy figures during the 2019–2020 Hong Kong protests.

In July 2022, Chan was deemed a close contact of a COVID-19 case and was assigned to home quarantine for a week.

In September 2022, Chan called for the decolonisation of Hong Kong, saying that the city had an "urgent need" to first remove historical terms from law books, stating "China has already resumed its sovereignty over Hong Kong for 25 years. Under the 'patriots ruling Hong Kong' principle, there is an urgent need to amend the local laws, which still carry colonial terms such as 'her majesty' and 'minister of state', to defend the authority of the country's constitution and reflect the constitutional order of Hong Kong."

In November 2022, Chan again called for the decolonization of Hong Kong, and said that more types of people (including senior counsels on contract) should pledge allegiance to Hong Kong. Chan also said that after Glory to Hong Kong was played in a rugby match that Hong Kong athletes in international events should also sign a declaration of loyalty to the government as well.

In December 2025, Chan was re-elected as Legislative Councilor though the same constituency.

Political offices
New title	Member of the Wong Tai Sin District Council; Representative for Ching Oi; 2004–2019	Succeeded by Eddie Sham
Legislative Council of Hong Kong
New constituency	Member of Legislative Council; Representative for Election Committee; 2022–present	Incumbent
