= Hong Kong Federation of Education Workers =

Education trade union in Hong Kong

Hong Kong Federation of Education Workers 香港教育工作者聯會
- President: Wong Kwan-yu
- Chairperson: Wong Kam-leung
- Founded: 13 April 1975; 51 years ago
- Headquarters: 17/F, Bright Way Tower, 33 Mong Kok Road, Kowloon
- Membership (2021): 42,000
- Regional affiliation: Pro-Beijing camp
- Colors: Green

Website
- www.hkfew.org.hk

Hong Kong Federation of Education Workers
- Traditional Chinese: 香港教育工作者聯會
- Simplified Chinese: 香港教育工作者联会
Transcriptions
Standard Mandarin
- Hanyu Pinyin: Xiānggǎng Jàoyùgōngzuòzhě Lián Huì
Yue: Cantonese
- Yale Romanization: Hēung góng gaau yuhk gūng jok jé lyùhn wuih
- Jyutping: Hoeng^{1} gong^{2} gaau^{3} juk^{6} gung^{1} zok^{3} ze^{2} lyun^{4} wui^{6}

Hong Kong Federation of Education Workers (HKFEW) is a pro-Beijing teachers union in Hong Kong. Established in 1975, it is currently the largest teachers union in Hong Kong, after the pan-democratic Hong Kong Professional Teachers' Union was forced to disband in 2021. It was established to "rally teachers to adopt the position of 'loving Hong Kong and the Motherland'", as part of China's united front work in Hong Kong's educational sector.

The trade union has some 42,000 members, as of 2021. The incumbent president is Wong Kwan-yu, also the supervisor of HKFEW Wong Cho Bau Secondary School. Former presidents, Jasper Tsang and Cheng Kai-nam, were also leaders of The Democratic Alliance for the Betterment and Progress of Hong Kong (DAB), a pro-Beijing political party. Tsang and Cheng had built up relationships with pro-Beijing teachers and mobilized them to vote for DAB in legislative and district elections. The HKFEW is said to play a crucial role in mobilizing pro-Beijing teachers to vote for like-minded candidates in the education functional constituency in the legislative council election.

== Election performance ==
=== Legislative Council elections ===
| Election | Number of popular votes | % of popular votes | GC seats | FC seats | EC seats | Total seats | +/− | Position |
|---|---|---|---|---|---|---|---|---|
| 2021 | – | – | 0 | 1 | 1 | 2 / 90 | Steady | 6th |
| 2025 | – | – | 0 | 1 | 3 | 4 / 90 | 2▲ | 4th▲ |

== See also ==
- HKFEW Wong Cho Bau Secondary School
- Hong Kong Professional Teachers' Union
- Education in Hong Kong
