= Andrew Fung =

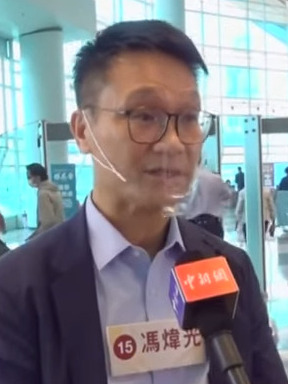
Fung in 2021

Andrew Fung Wai-kwong (Chinese: 馮煒光, born 27 June 1961) is the current information coordinator for the Office of the Chief Executive of Hong Kong.

== Biography ==
Fung was born on 27 June 1961. He was educated at the University of Hong Kong and was president of the Hong Kong University Students' Union in 1984 and president of the Hong Kong Federation of Students in 1985. He was a member of the pro-democracy political group Meeting Point and treasurer of the group until it was merged into the Democratic Party where he was elected the founding treasurer of the party and had been on the party's Executive Committee. He is also on the Hong Kong Basic Law Consultative Committee, and was formerly a member of the Central Policy Unit and Urban Renewal Authority.

Fung was first elected in South Horizons West constituency to the Southern District Council in the 2007 District Council election. He was re-elected in 2011 District Council election.

Once a member of the pro-democratic Democratic Party, he quit the party in 2012 and he joined Leung Chun-ying's government in 2013.

In December 2013, he was appointed by Leung Chun-ying as the government's information coordinator under the Office of the Chief Executive. Due to the tensions between the Democratic Party and Leung, when he applied for the undersecretary posts in June 2012, he was condemned as traitor and he subsequently quit the party.

Fung, perhaps unwittingly, shared a photograph on Facebook of a bloodied policeman who had allegedly been the victim of protester violence overnight on 15 October during the 2014 Hong Kong protests. It turned out to have been a hoax by people who had taken a publicity shot from an upcoming drama series about zombie cops, but Fung's sharing of the image occurred the same day that television footage surfaced of a handcuffed protester, Ken Tsang, being violently assaulted by seven policemen made prime time news bulletins. Fung condemned the violence of pro-democracy protesters, and had hoped to gain sympathy for the police with his post, but instead resulted in being ridiculed.

Party political offices
New political party	Treasurer of Democratic Party; 1994–1998	Succeeded by Wong Bing-kuen
Political offices
Preceded by Lo Kam-hung	Member of Southern District Council; Representative for South Horizons West; 2008–2013	Succeeded by Judy Kapui Chan
Government offices
Preceded by June Tang	Information Coordinator of Chief Executive Office; 2013–present	Incumbent
