= 2021 Hong Kong legislative election =

- 19 December 2021

All 90 seats to the Legislative Council 46 seats needed for a majority
- Opinion polls
- Registered: 4,472,863 (GC) ▲18.36%
- Turnout: 1,350,680 (30.20%) ▼28.08pp
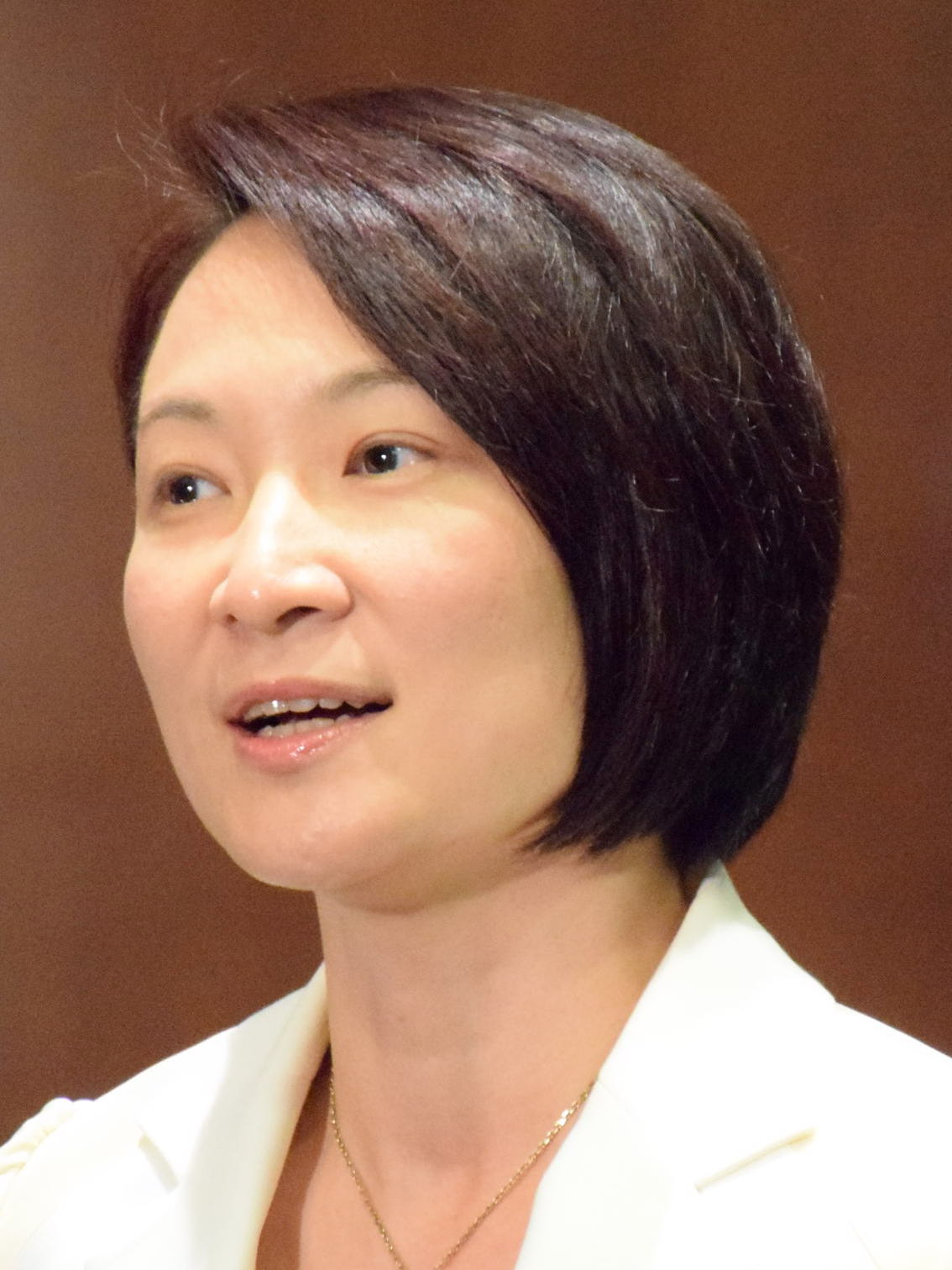

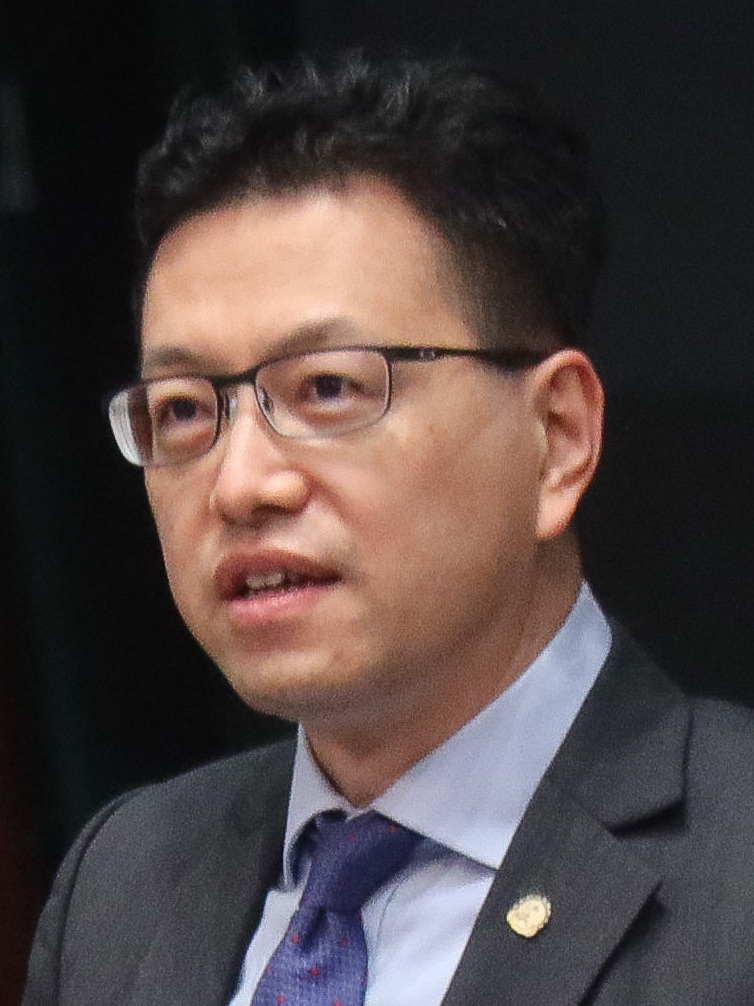

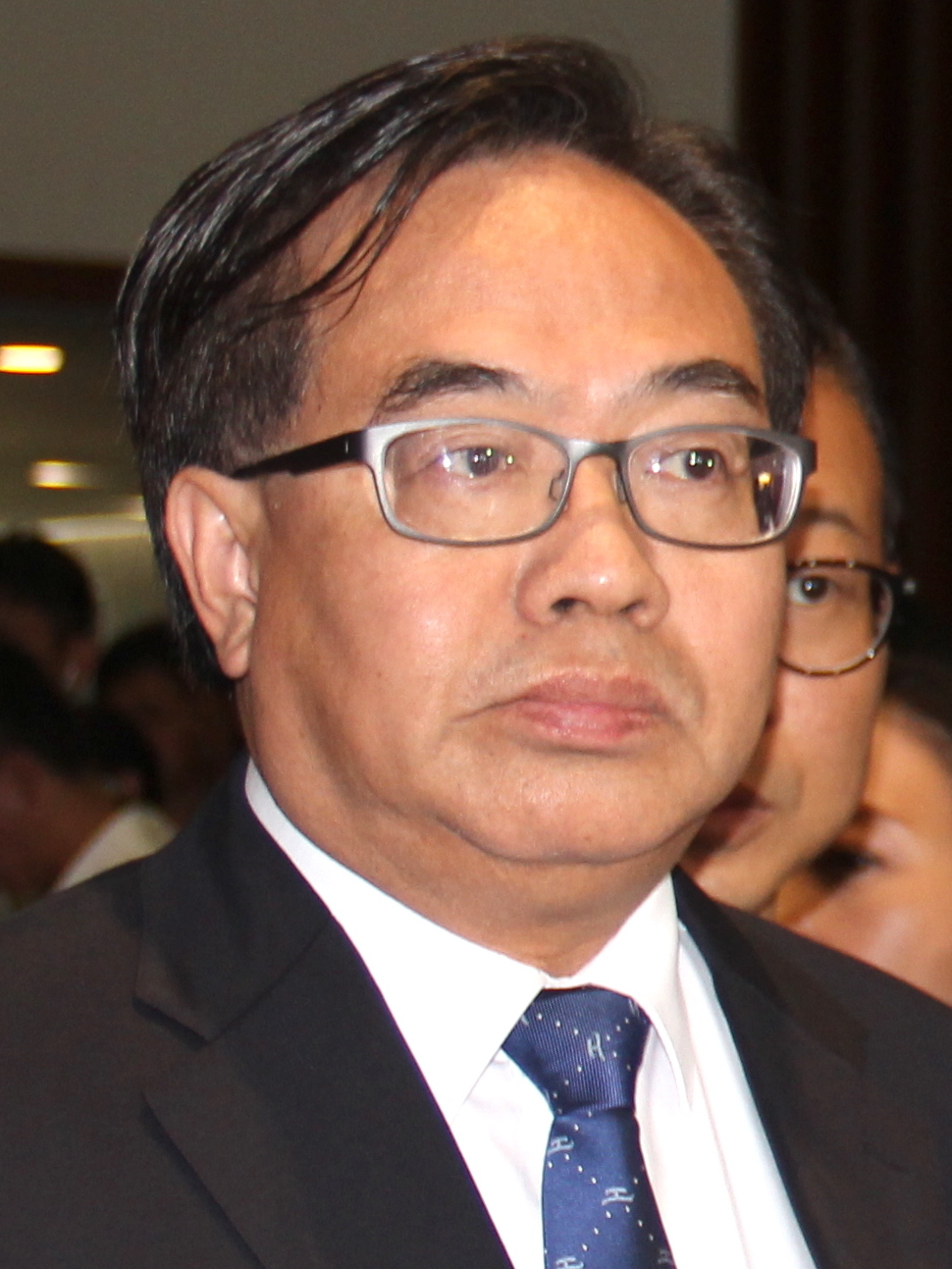

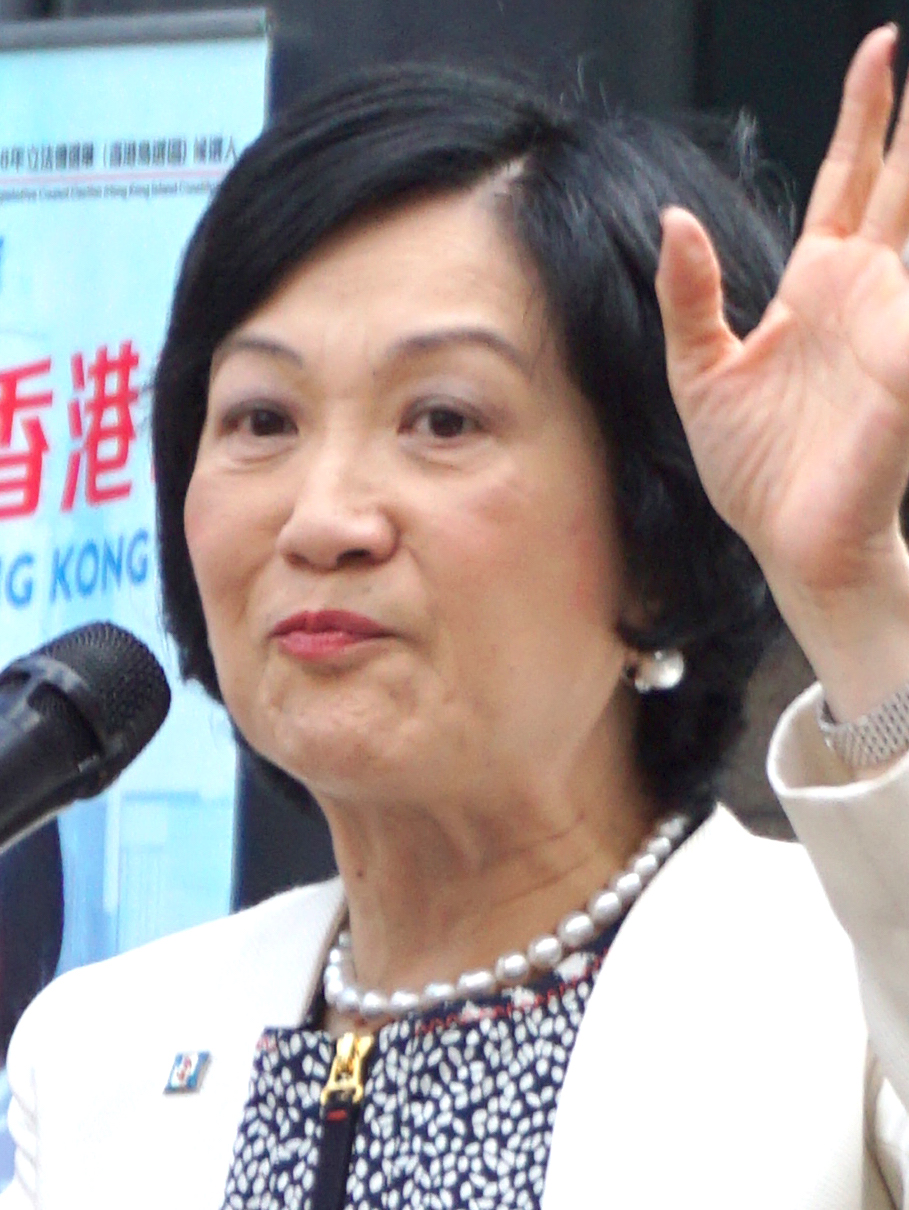

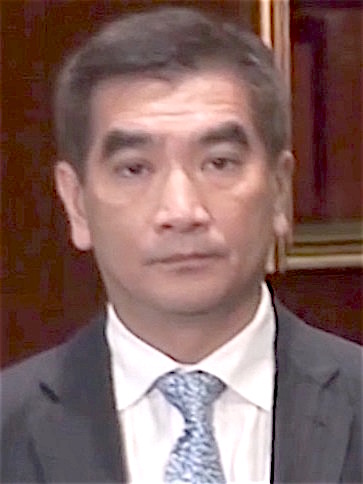

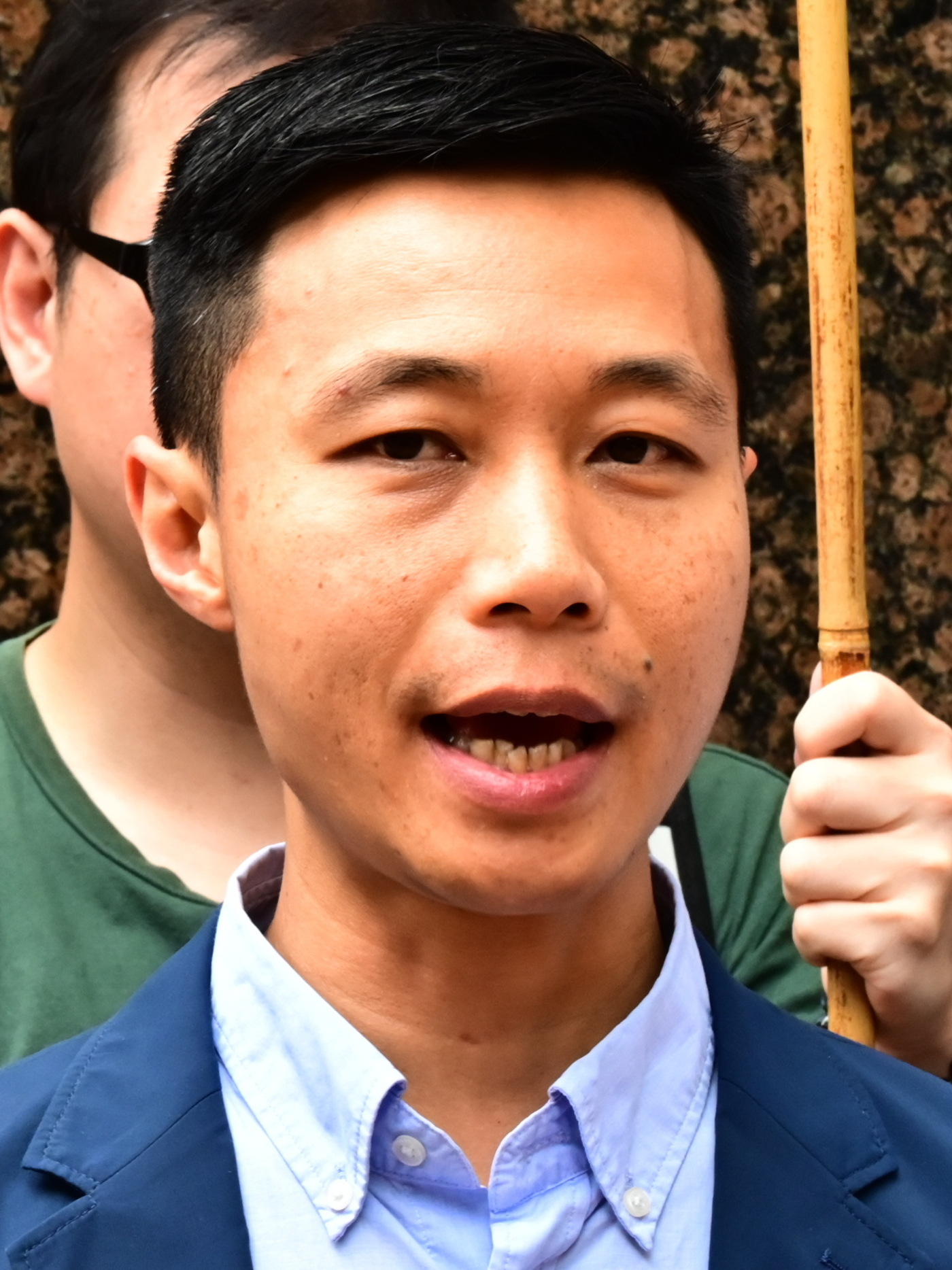

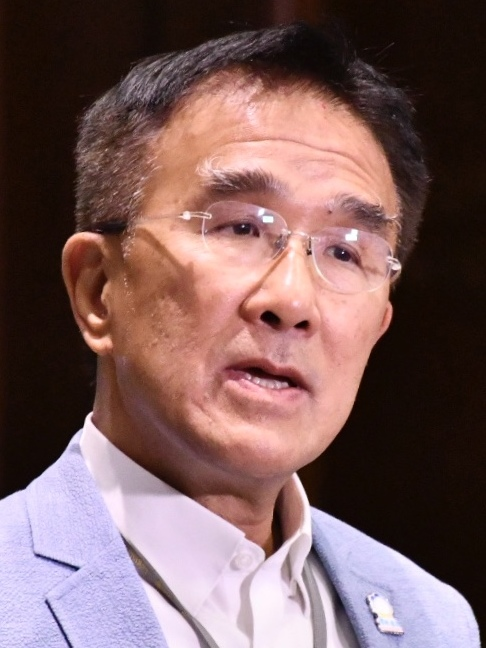

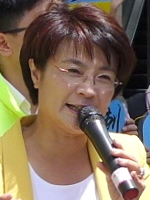
	First party	Second party	Third party
Leader	Starry Lee	Ng Chau-pei	Lo Wai-kwok
Party	DAB	FTU	BPA
Alliance	Pro-Beijing	Pro-Beijing	Pro-Beijing
Leader's seat	Kowloon Central	HK Island East	Engineering
Last election	12 seats, 16.68%	5 seats, 7.83%	7 seats, 2.29%
Seats won	19	8	7
Seat change	▲6	▲4	▼1
Popular vote	680,563	192,235	Did not run in GCs
Percentage	51.43%	14.53%	N/A
Swing	▲34.75pp	▲6.70pp	N/A
	Fourth party	Fifth party	Sixth party
Leader	Regina Ip	Felix Chung	Wong Kwan-yu
Party	NPP	Liberal	FEW
Alliance	Pro-Beijing	Pro-Beijing	Pro-Beijing
Leader's seat	HK Island West	Textiles & Garment (lost seat)	Did not stand
Last election	3 seats, 7.73%	4 seats, 0.99%	Did not contest
Seats won	5	4	2
Seat change	▲3	Steady	▲2
Popular vote	150,188	Did not run in GCs	Did not run in GCs
Percentage	11.35%	N/A	N/A
Swing	▲3.62pp	N/A	N/A
	Seventh party	Eighth party	Ninth party
Leader	Lam Chun-sing	Michael Tien	Christine Fong
Party	FLU	Roundtable	PP
Alliance	Pro-Beijing	Pro-Beijing	Pro-Beijing
Leader's seat	Election Committee	NT North West	Did not stand
Last election	1 seat	New party	Did not contest
Seats won	2	1	1
Seat change	▲1	Steady	▲1
Popular vote	Did not run in GCs	40,009	38,214
Percentage	N/A	3.02%	2.89%
Swing	N/A	N/A	N/A
Party control before election
Pro-Beijing camp
Party control after election
Pro-Beijing camp

The 2021 Hong Kong Legislative Council election was a general election held on 19 December 2021 for the 7th Legislative Council of Hong Kong.

Under the drastic Beijing-imposed electoral overhaul, the composition of the council was altered to reduce and limit popular representation along with ensuring a pro-Beijing majority. The total number of seats was increased from 70 to 90 seats, with the directly elected geographical constituencies (GCs) reduced from 35 to 20 seats, the trade-based indirectly elected functional constituencies (FCs) staying at 30, and the additional 40 seats being elected by the 1,500-member Election Committee. The 5 directly elected District Council (Second) FC seats were eliminated. In total, the directly elected seats were reduced from 57.1% to 22.2%. Opposition pan-democratic candidates were banned and either arrested or forced into exile. As a result of these changes the election was considered to be "patriots-only" and by numerous organizations to be neither free nor fair.

Originally scheduled on 6 September 2020, Chief Executive Carrie Lam unprecedentedly postponed the election citing the COVID-19 pandemic. That abruptly halted the momentum of the pro-democrats who campaigned for a "35+" majority, building from the historic 2019 anti-government protests and the pro-democracy landslide in the November District Council election. Subsequently, the government began to purge the opposition with the installation of the Hong Kong national security law. By mid 2021, almost all leading pro-democracy legislators and activists had either been arrested, imprisoned or forced to exile, with several major pro-democracy organisations, trade unions and media outlets disbanded by means of intimidation.

Despite efforts by the government to boost voter turnout by offering free transport and establishing polling stations at the Chinese border, the election had the lowest turnout of any Legislative Council election in history. The number of blank or invalid votes also set a record high. These issues were blamed on a lack of interest in the election amongst pro-democracy Hongkongers.

89 out of 90 elected members were the pro-Beijing establishment, with one sole moderate member in the mix represented by Third Side's Tik Chi-yuen. The traditional flagship pro-Beijing party Democratic Alliance for the Betterment and Progress of Hong Kong (DAB) emerged as the biggest winner with 19 seats, by securing a seat in each of the ten geographical constituencies.

== Background ==
=== Election postponement ===
Originally scheduled on 6 September 2020, the recent resurgence of the COVID-19 cases in July sparked the speculation of a possible delay in the election. Tam Yiu-chung, the sole representative from Hong Kong on National People's Congress Standing Committee (NPCSC), suggested that the government should not rule out postponing the upcoming election, denying any criticism that the pro-Beijing camp was afraid of losing the election.

On 31 July, the last day of the nomination period, Chief Executive Carrie Lam announced the invocation of the Emergency Regulations Ordinance, which gave her to the emergency powers to postpone the election. On 11 August the NPCSC unanimously passed a decision to extend the term of the incumbent 6th Legislative Council for no less than one year.

The delay was seen as a blow to the pro-democrats who aimed to achieve a "35+" majority by riding the 2019 District Council landslide on a wave of massive anti-government protests and concerns about the new national security law enacted by Beijing on Hong Kong. It was also seen as the latest in a quick series of aggressive moves by the Beijing authorities to thwart their momentum and sideline the pro-democracy movement. The pro-democrats accused Lam of using the pandemic as a pretext to stop people from voting and warned that doing so would "trigger a constitutional crisis in the city".

=== Crackdown on opposition ===
On 30 June 2020, the National People's Committee Standing Committee (NPCSC) enacted the national security law to outlaw "separatism, subversion, terrorism and foreign interference" in Hong Kong, targeting the recent widespread protests and the pro-democracy movement. On 10 August 2020, the National Security Department of the Hong Kong Police Force raided the offices of Next Digital, the parent company of prominent pro-democracy newspaper Apple Daily. Next Digital founder and pro-democracy activist Jimmy Lai was arrested and later charged with violating the national security law.

In November, the NPCSC ruled in a decision that bars Legislative Council members from supporting Hong Kong independence, refusing to recognise Beijing's sovereignty over Hong Kong, seeking help from "foreign countries or foreign forces to interfere in the affairs of the region" or committing "other acts that endanger national security". As a result, the four sitting legislators, Alvin Yeung, Kwok Ka-ki, Dennis Kwok and Kenneth Leung whose candidacies were invalidated by the Returning Officers in the later-postponed September election, were ousted from the legislature with immediate effect. After the disqualification, the 15 remaining pro-democracy legislators announced their resignation in protest of the decision. Adding to the previous disqualifications and resignations, the total number of vacancies jumped to 27 with virtually no opposition in the Legislative Council as a result.

In January 2021, 53 pro-democracy activists, former opposition legislators, social workers and academics were arrested by the National Security Department of the Hong Kong Police Force under the national security law for holding and running in the primaries for the originally scheduled Legislative Council general election. Secretary for Security John Lee accused the opposition activists of "subverting state power" for holding the primaries and said that they were suspected of "conspiring to obtain 35 or more seats at the Legislative Council (LegCo) with a view to ... forcing the resignation of the Chief Executive, as well as bringing the HKSAR Government to a complete standstill, ... to paralyse the Government and seriously interfere in, disrupt and undermine the performance of government duties and functions".

On 27 January, CCP general secretary Xi Jinping said that Hong Kong could only maintain its long-term stability and security by ensuring "patriots governing Hong Kong" when he heard a work report delivered by Carrie Lam. On 1 March, Hong Kong and Macau Affairs Office director Xia Baolong in the seminar of "patriots governing Hong Kong" stated that Hong Kong must establish a "democratic electoral system with Hong Kong characteristics."

On 20 May, former legislator Eddie Chu, who was detained under the national security law, dissolved his Team Chu Hoi-dick of New Territories West. On 26 June, the Neo Democrats, affiliated with detained former legislator Gary Fan, announced its disbandment, citing the political environment after the implementation of the national security law. On 24 June, Hong Kong's largest pro-democracy newspaper Apple Daily was forced to shut down after the police detained the chief editor and five other executives and froze the company-linked assets on the basis of the paper having breached the city's new national security law. About a month later, the 95,000-member Hong Kong Professional Teachers' Union (HKPTU), the largest single trades union in the city, announced on 10 August 2021 that it would disband after more than a week-long attacks from the Chinese state media describing the union as a "poisonous tumour" that must be "eradicated". On 15 August, the protest coalition Civil Human Rights Front (CHRF), which had organised some of the biggest pro-democracy demonstrations in Hong Kong's history, decided to disband, citing the oppression its member groups were facing and also the "unprecedented challenges" the civil society was having. It was followed by the Hong Kong Alliance in Support of Patriotic Democratic Movements in China (HKASPDMC) in September after its HK$2.2 million assets was frozen and the group was charged with inciting subversion and being "an agent of foreign forces "under the national security law. The Hong Kong Confederation of Trade Unions (HKCTU), Hong Kong's largest independent trade union, was also disbanded in October after pro-Beijing media suggested the union was a "foreign agent" or "colluding with foreign forces" due to its affiliation with the International Trade Union Confederation (ITUC). Civic Passion, Community Sha Tin, Community March, Cheung Sha Wan Community Establishment Power, Tsz Wan Shan Constructive Power, and the Tuen Mun Community Network were also forced to disband among other political groups.

In May 2021, the Hong Kong government passed the Public Offices (Candidacy and Taking Up Offices) (Miscellaneous Amendments) Ordinance 2021, which extended the oath of allegiance requirements to District Councillors among other public offices. Amid the reports suggesting the councillors would be asked to return their accrued salaries if their oaths were deemed invalid, 278 pro-democrat councillors resigned before they were requested to take the oath. As a result, 49 pro-democrat councillors' oaths were ruled invalid and the councillors were ousted, leaving more than 70 per cent of the seats in the 18 District Councils vacant and effectively negating the pro-democracy victory in the 2019 election.

== Electoral overhaul ==
Changes to the composition of the Legislative Council: 2016 composition (70 seats) Directly elected geographical constituencies (35) Nominated by District Councillors, directly elected District Council (Second) functional constituency (5) Indirectly elected trade-based functional constituencies (30) 2021 composition (90 seats) Directly elected geographical constituencies (20) Indirectly elected trade-based functional constituencies (30) Newly created Election Committee constituency (40)

On 11 March 2021, the National People's Congress (NPC) passed a decision to rewrite the election rules in Hong Kong to impose a more restrictive electoral system, claiming it was to ensure a system of "patriots governing Hong Kong". The new electoral system was further amended by a 30 March decision by the National People's Congress Standing Committee (NPCSC), which amended both the Annex I and Annex II of the Basic Law of Hong Kong, specifying the electoral methods for the Chief Executive (CE) and the Legislative Council respectively.

Under the new system, the number of Legislative Council seats would be increased to 90 from 70, but the number of directly elected geographical constituency seats would be lowered to 20 from 35, while the trade-based indirectly elected functional constituency seats would remain at 30, and the Beijing-controlled 1,500-seat Election Committee would elect 40 seats to the Legislative Council. The five District Council (Second) "super seats" introduced in the 2010 electoral reform package and elected by all registered voters would be eliminated.

For the functional constituencies, the District Council (First), which would have been held by the pro-democrats due to the 2019 District Council landslide, were eliminated, while another pro-democracy stronghold Health Services was merged with the Medical and Information Technology. Three new constituencies were created, namely the Commercial (Third), the Technology and Innovation, and the HKSAR deputies to the National People's Congress, HKSAR members of the National Committee of the Chinese People's Political Consultative Conference, and representatives of relevant national organisations.

The remaining 20 directly elected seats were divided into 10 geographical constituencies, in which two members will be elected per constituency, making it a single non-transferable vote (SNTV) system. Each candidate must receive nominations of at least two but no more than four members from each sector of the Election Committee. A Candidate Eligibility Review Committee was set up to review and confirm the eligibility of candidates with the consultation of the Committee for Safeguarding National Security and the review of the National Security Department of the Hong Kong Police Force. The decision of the Review Committee shall not be challenged legally.

Chief Executive Carrie Lam announced the further postponement of the Legislative Council election from the originally scheduled September to December, swapping with the planned Election Committee subsector elections, as the reintroduction of the Election Committee seats to the Legislative Council meant that the new Election Committee had to be elected prior to the Legislative Council election. Meanwhile, the next Chief Executive election will be held in March 2022 as originally scheduled. Following the Election Committee Subsector elections, all but one member of the EC was affiliated with the pro-Beijing camp, meaning that in the likely scenario all 40 EC constituency elected members are pro-Beijing, the camp only needs 6 more seats out of the 50 remaining for a legislative majority.

In April, the Hong Kong government unveiled the Improving Electoral System (Consolidated Amendments) Bill 2021, which included a draft of changes to the Elections (Corrupt and Illegal Conduct) Ordinance that would "regulate acts that manipulate or undermine elections", criminalising anyone who incites the others not to vote or cast blank or spoiled ballots (including as a form of protest). Violators could face up to three years in prison.

== Pro-democrats' boycott ==
=== Local parties ===
The pro-democrats suffered a significant blow after mass arrests, resignations, disqualifications and exodus in light of the national security law. Many in the camp believed the space for them to participate in the overhauled political landscape had been extinguished. The League of Social Democrats (LSD) announced on 1 June 2021 that it would boycott the election after leader Raphael Wong accused the Chinese Communist Party (CCP) of "intending to wipe out dissidents", which came following the arrests of both its vice-chairmen Leung Kwok-hung and Jimmy Sham under the national security law and the conviction of secretary Avery Ng over an unauthorised assembly.

The two other moderate pro-democratic parties, the Democratic Party and the Hong Kong Association for Democracy and People's Livelihood (ADPL), were relatively open to running in the election. The Democratic Party was split with former legislator Fred Li voicing support for participating in the election, while the majority advocated for not fielding candidates. Pro-Beijing Democratic Alliance for the Betterment and Progress of Hong Kong (DAB) veteran Lo Man-tuen had warned the Democrats not to boycott the election, suggesting that it might breach the national security law. In September, the party decided to set up a mechanism to assess members wishing to run. However after the nomination period ended on 11 October 2021, no Democrat had signed up for running after Han Dongfang, the only member revealing an intention to contest a seat, failed to get enough nominations. It became clear that the chance for the Democrats to run in the election again had been denied when former legislators James To and Roy Kwong along with some other members who had expressed their interest to run were all unseated from the District Councils after their oaths were deemed invalid by the government, which banned them from standing in elections within the next five years.

On 15 October, the ADPL convened a general meeting that approved members to run in the election. However, none of its members signed up in the one week nomination period, despite former legislator Bruce Liu having said he was interested in running again.

=== Overseas calls ===
Former Democratic legislator Ted Hui, who fled Hong Kong after being charged with at least nine counts related to the 2019 protests, urged pro-democracy supporters to cast protest votes in the election, in order to achieve the highest number of blank votes in the history of Hong Kong elections, and for blank votes to exceed the number of valid votes. The Independent Commission Against Corruption (ICAC) issued a warning against Hui, stating that inciting others to cast blank votes violated the newly passed election laws. Secretary for Security Chris Tang slammed Hui's remarks as "despicably inciting people to break the law". He also warned that "these illegal behaviours, disrupting the election, may also violate relevant provisions in the 'Hong Kong national security law'."

The ICAC arrested three local netizens on 9 November for urging voters to cast blank votes in the election. On 29 November, the court issued warrants for Hui and former District Councillor Yau Man-chun, who made Facebook posts asking people to boycott the "fake election" after resettling in the UK. On 9 November, ICAC arrested three more people for reposting an online post that inciting others to cast blank votes. Four more persons, including former president of the Chinese University of Hong Kong Student Union Jacky So Tsun-fung, were arrested on 15 December for reposting Hui's online posts that called on voters. On 16 December, two more people were arrested for the same charge, bringing the total number of arrestees to 10. Two more people were arrested on 17 December, being accused of urging people to join unauthorised assemblies and of calling on people to adopt various means to influence the elections by committing arson and attacking or killing police officers and government officials.

In an editorial of The Wall Street Journal published on 29 November, "Hong Kong Says Vote – or Else", the journal said that "China's Communist Party wants the world to forget how it crushed the autonomy it promised to the territory" and "boycotts and blank ballots are one of the last ways for Hong Kongers to express their political views". In return, Secretary for Constitutional and Mainland Affairs Erick Tsang issued a letter warning the journal about inciting others to cast invalid vote, "irrespective whether the incitement is made in Hong Kong or abroad" and "reserve the right to take necessary action". On 8 December, Hong Kong Economic and Trade Office in London issued a letter to The Sunday Times, criticising its editorial article "China shows its true colours – and they're not pretty" on 5 December contains "factual inaccuracies" and warning it that its call for a boycott "to the point where a low turnout would be an embarrassment for the authorities" could violate the election law in Hong Kong, "whether the incitement is made in Hong Kong or abroad".

Former legislator and exiled democracy activist Nathan Law called on the voters to ignore the election this month, saying they should not lend it any legitimacy. Secretary for Security Chris Tang called a Law a "coward" and "traitor" and a "runaway anti-China and anti-Hong Kong element", slamming him for his planned presence at U.S. President Joe Biden's upcoming Summit for Democracy on 10 December. Commissioner of the Ministry of Foreign Affairs in Hong Kong Liu Guangyuan slammed the U.S. for using democracy as a pretext to stir up trouble in Hong Kong, saying that "any foreign forces using whatever means or cover as an attempt to interfere with Hong Kong's Legislative Council election will definitely face fightback from the Chinese government."

Just one day before the election, the ICAC issued warrants against five exiled activists, including Law and Sunny Cheung, who allegedly engaged in illegal conduct by encouraging others not to vote in the LegCo election.

== Contesting parties and candidates ==
=== Pro-Beijing camp ===
The pro-Beijing camp was poised to win comfortably after the overhaul in the electoral system. Director of the Hong Kong and Macau Affairs Office Xia Baolong reportedly traveled to Shenzhen in late October 2021 to orchestrate and coordinate candidate lists for the pro-Beijing camp. The South China Morning Post reported that Beijing had been working behind the scenes to ensure every constituency would be contested. Some veteran incumbents who were previously re-elected uncontestedly were told to "find someone" to run against this time.

- Democratic Alliance for the Betterment and Progress of Hong Kong (DAB): Under the slogan of "Reform, seek changes for the future", the flagship pro-Beijing party initially fielded 18 candidates in the election, one for each of the 10 geographical constituencies, four for the functional constituencies and four for the re-established Election Committee constituency. During the nomination period, the DAB fielded an additional number of four candidates, two running in the Election Committee and two running in the functional constituencies, bringing the total number of candidates to 22.
- Business and Professionals Alliance for Hong Kong (BPA): The business-oriented party fielded eight candidates, all in the indirectly elected elections. The senior member, Abraham Shek of Real Estate and Construction, retired. The only directly elected incumbent Priscilla Leung switched her constituency to the newly established Election Committee constituency, while her place in Kowloon West was taken up by Scott Leung who ran under the Kowloon West New Dynamic (KWND) banner.
- Hong Kong Federation of Trade Unions (FTU): The FTU fielded nine candidates, with three in geographical constituencies, two in the Labour functional constituency and four in the Election Committee constituency. While veteran Wong Kwok-kin did not seek re-election, incumbents Alice Mak and Luk Chung-hung contested in the newly created Election Committee constituency and president Ng Chau-pei ran in Hong Kong Island East, replacing Kwok Wai-keung who ran in the Labour functional constituency instead.
- Liberal Party: All four incumbent Liberal legislators sought re-election in their respective functional constituencies, with party vice chairman Lee Chun-keung running in the Election Committee constituency and Leung Yat-cheong in Industrial (First). Howard Chao quits the party as he stands in Real Estate and Construction to present a more neutral image. No candidate ran in the geographical constituencies, making it the first time the Liberal Party did not contest the direct election.
- New People's Party (NPP): The NPP originally fielded five candidates under the slogan of "One Country Two Systems works for you", with party chairwoman Regina Ip seeking her fourth term in Hong Kong Island West. Two other candidates, Marcus Liu and Dominic Lee ran in Hong Kong Island East and New Territories North East respectively, while incumbent Eunice Yung and former LegCo candidate Judy Chan ran in the Election Committee constituency. Party vice chairman Lai Tung-kwok submitted his nomination on the last day of the nomination period, making three NPP candidates in the Election Committee.
- Roundtable: Michael Tien switched his base in Tsuen Wan to run in the New Territories North West. Another member Mark Chong also intended to run in the geographical constituency but failed to obtain enough nominations.
- Federation of Hong Kong and Kowloon Labour Unions (FLU): Besides its single Labour functional constituency seat, the FLU president Lam Chun-sing ran in the Election Committee constituency, while newcomer Chau Siu-chung sought to succeed retiring incumbent Poon Siu-ping.
- New Prospect for Hong Kong: The newly established political group consisting mainly of Mainland Chinese Hongkongers was represented by Gary Zhang who ran in New Territories North.

A dozen executives at state-owned companies contested the election. Chairman and executive director of Bocom International Tan Yueheng who fielded his candidacy for the Election Committee constituency did not disclose his political affiliation, although it is shown on the China Merchants Bank and other websites that he is a member of the Chinese Communist Party. Hoey Simon Lee, who also ran in the Election Committee constituency, is the chief strategy officer of the Guangdong-Hong Kong-Macau Greater Bay Area at the China Resources Group. Yau Wai-kwong, candidate for the newly established Commercial (Third) functional constituency, is the director and general manager of China Overseas Property. Yau ran against Erik Yim, general manager of the China Merchants Port, while deputy general manager of the China Travel Service Yiu Pak-leung ran in the Tourism functional constituency.

=== Independent democrats ===
Four independents from a pro-democracy background secured enough nominations from the Election Committee members to run in the election. Former pro-democracy legislator and incumbent Wong Tai Sin District Councillor Mandy Tam and Islands District Councillor Fong Lung-fei were the first two to stand. Tam received one nomination came from Hong Kong deputy to the NPC Maggie Chan and former chairman of the Federation of Public Housing Estates Wong Kwan. Fong secured a nomination from Reverend Peter Koon of Hong Kong Sheng Kung Hui and All-China Youth Federation committee member Sharon Tam. Sai Kung District Council vice chairman Daryl Choi became the third pro-democracy candidate to have secured sufficient nominations to run in the election when he stood in New Territories South East. The fourth pro-democrat, Tsuen Wan District Councillor Lau Cheuk-yu entered the election when he secured enough nominations to stand in New Territories South West.

=== Others ===
- Third Side and Path of Democracy: The two self-claimed "middle-of-the-road" groups led by former pro-democrats Tik Chi-yuen and Ronny Tong announced an electoral coalition on 22 October 2021. Third Side planned to field three candidates including chairman Tik Chi-yuen in Social Welfare, while Path of Democracy targeted three geographical constituencies, one in Legal functional constituency and one in Election Committee constituency. Tong, however, expressed difficulties in obtaining the required nominations from all sectors of the Election Committee and made an appeal to all Election Committee members after all of its five candidates failed to secure sufficient nominations. Maxine Yao of Path of Democracy who failed to get enough nomination complained about the "manipulation" in the nomination process, saying that they were told that they had to switch constituency or they could not stand. Ultimately, the two groups successfully fielded two candidates each, after coordinating with other candidates on which constituency to stand in. Allan Wong who initially planned to stand in New Territories North, could get sufficient nominations only after he switched to New Territories North East.

Some former pro-democrats also decided to run, including former legislator Frederick Fung who left the ADPL to run against Lee Cheuk-yan who was commonly supported by the camp in the November 2018 Kowloon West by-election, and Wong Sing-chi who was expelled from the Democratic Party over his support for the 2015 Beijing-decreed political reform proposal.

== Retiring incumbents ==
Constituency	Departing incumbents	Party	Notes
Kowloon West	Chiang Lai-wan	DAB	Announced retirement on 29 October 2021
Kowloon East	Wong Kwok-kin	FTU	Not included on the candidate list announced by the FTU on 29 October 2021
Kowloon East	Wilson Or	DAB	Not included on the candidate list announced by the DAB on 29 October 2021
New Territories West	Leung Che-cheung	DAB	Not included on the candidate list announced by the DAB on 29 October 2021
Medical	Pierre Chan	Nonpartisan	Announced departure on 19 September 2021 citing a turbulent political landscape
Labour	Poon Siu-ping	FLU	Chose Chau Siu-chung as successor
Real Estate and Construction	Abraham Shek	BPA	Confirmed retirement on 7 November 2021
Tourism	Yiu Si-wing	Nonpartisan	Did not submit nomination, supported Yiu Pak-leung as successor
Import and Export	Wong Ting-kwong	DAB	Confirmed retirement and chose Kennedy Wong as successor

== Opinion polling ==
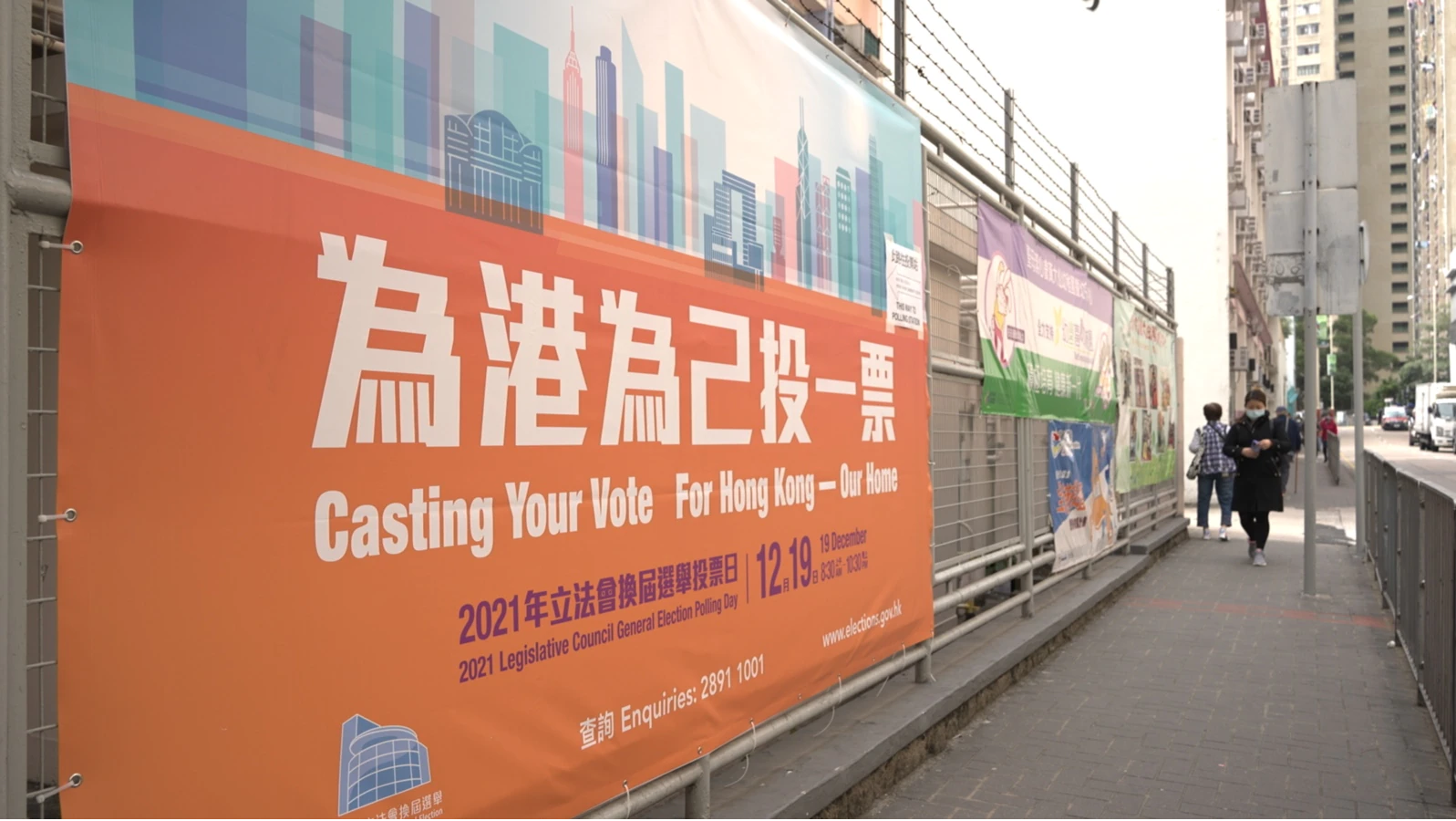
Government poster urging citizens to vote in the election

The Public Opinion Research Institute (PORI), formerly the Public Opinion Programme under the University of Hong Kong (HKU) headed by Robert Chung would not conduct tracking polls on the election for the first time since the 1995 Legislative Council election, citing budget constraints and the absence of media outlets' partnership, but would conduct three rounds of public opinion polls tracking people's intention to vote with the option of "blank vote". The Hong Kong Legal Exchange Foundation led by pro-Beijing lawyers accused PORI of "having ulterior motives and openly challenging the national security law and election laws" by conducting citywide surveys that could "incite" voters to cast invalid ballots. Pro-Beijing mouthpiece Ta Kung Pao also attacked PORI for allegedly inciting voters to case blank votes or not to vote in the following days. ICAC Commissioner Simon Peh said he could not rule out that PORI had broken the law.

In a poll conducted by pro-Beijing Hong Kong Research Association from 12 to 16 November, about 54 per cent of the 1,067 respondents said they would cast their ballots, with 28 per cent indicating otherwise, while 15 per cent were undecided. In the first round of PORI survey from 15 to 18 November, about 52 per cent of the 838 respondents said they would cast their ballots, a sharp decline from the 83 per cent respondents said they would cast their ballots in the 2016 election, the lowest record since the first Legislative Council direct election in 1991.

Chief Executive Carrie Lam dismissed concerns over possible low turnout in an interview with the Chinese Communist Party-owned tabloid Global Times on 7 December, defending that "there is a saying that when the government is doing well and its credibility is high, the voter turnout will decrease because the people do not have a strong demand to choose different lawmakers to supervise the government".

Chinese Communist Party's official newspaper People's Daily on 9 December accused the PORI of aligning with forces that are "anti China and disrupting Hong Kong" by insinuating that the public's desire to vote in the election is low and using "so-called public opinion to hijack the society" in order to undermine the election's authority and credibility. The article added that "it is time to clean it up and ring funeral bells for it".

=== Voting intention ===
View source data.

Dates conducted	Pollster	Conducted by	Sample size	Yes		No	Undecided/ don't know/ hard to say
Dates conducted	Pollster	Conducted by	Sample size	For candidate	Blank or invalid vote	No	Undecided/ don't know/ hard to say
9–14 Dec	Public Opinion Research Institute	Telephone	891	48%		39%	13%
29 Nov – 8 Dec	Hong Kong Institute of Asia-Pacific Studies	Telephone	628	48%		33%	19%
29 Nov – 3 Dec	Public Opinion Research Institute	Telephone	861	51%		36%	13%
29 Nov – 2 Dec	Public Opinion Research Institute	Online	6,399	47%		40%	14%
23–25 Nov	Public Opinion Research Institute	Online	5,488	46%		40%	13%
23–25 Nov	Public Opinion Research Institute	Online	5,496	30%	8%	35%	27%
15–18 Nov	Public Opinion Research Institute	Telephone	838	52%		33%	16%
12–16 Nov	Hong Kong Research Association	Telephone	1,067	54%		28%	18%

== Voting arrangements ==
=== Border polling stations ===
Due to the travel restriction between mainland China and Hong Kong since the COVID-19 outbreak, the government decided to set up three polling stations on the Hong Kong–Shenzhen boundary control points, namely Heung Yuen Wai, Lo Wu and Lok Ma Chau Spur Line, to allow up to 110,000 Hong Kong eligible voters to cross the border just to cast their ballot. The public and media would also not be allowed to observe vote counting at the stations. Secretary for Constitutional and Mainland Affairs Erick Tsang dismissed the doubt that the arrangement might not comply with the election law which states that only those who "ordinarily resides in Hong Kong" are eligible to vote, claiming that a number of other factors should also be considered. He also ensured the government would be able to enforce anti-corruption law if there were illegal practices occurring in the mainland. Political scientist and pundit Ivan Choy said the proposal was a way to boost the turnout but doubted its effectiveness as it would be "quite demanding" for electors to take hours-long trips from their home provinces and cities to cast a ballot at the border checkpoints.

=== Free transportation on election day ===
Hoping to boost the turnout, the government on 10 December announced free bus services provided by KMB, Citybus, New World First Bus, Long Win Bus, and New Lantao Bus and free train services including MTR, light rail and tram on the election day. Citizens, in turn, seized the chance to travel around the city, with long queues around the city waiting for transportation and crowded scenes in tourist spots, in a stark comparison with polling stations that were without build up of people.

== Results ==
Result by parties and camps

As expected, most seats were won by the pro-Beijing camp, with only one non-establishment candidate being elected (Tik Chi-yuen in the Social Welfare functional constituency). Turnout was 30.20%, the lowest in the history of legislative elections. Over 2% of ballots cast were blank or invalid.

Summary of the 19 December 2021 Legislative Council of Hong Kong election results
Political affiliation	Geographical Constituencies				Functional Constituencies (Note: Labour constituency is not counted due to different voting system used. Vote percentage change is compared to traditional functional constituencies in the last election.)				ECC seats	Total seats	±
Political affiliation	Votes	%	±pp	Seats	Votes	%	±pp	Seats	ECC seats	Total seats	±
Democratic Alliance for the Betterment and Progress of Hong Kong	680,563	51.43	▲34.75	10	8,150	12.27	▲12.21	4	5	19	▲6
Hong Kong Federation of Trade Unions	192,235	14.53	▲6.70	3	N/A	N/A	N/A	2	3	8	▲4
Business and Professionals Alliance for Hong Kong	–	–	–	–	5,341	8.04	▲5.28	5	2	7	▼1
New People's Party	150,118	11.35	▲3.62	2	–	–	–	–	3	5	▲3
Liberal Party	–	–	–	–	1,513	2.28	▼1.54	3	1	4	Steady
Hong Kong Federation of Education Workers	–	–	–	–	10,641	16.02	N/A	1	1	2	▲2
Federation of Hong Kong and Kowloon Labour Unions	–	–	–	–	N/A	N/A	N/A	1	1	2	▲1
Roundtable	40,009	3.02	New	1	–	–	–	–	–	1	Steady
Professional Power	38,214	2.89	N/A	1	–	–	–	–	–	1	▲1
Kowloon West New Dynamic	36,840	2.78	N/A	1	–	–	–	–	–	1	▲1
New Prospect for Hong Kong	28,986	2.19	New	1	–	–	–	–	–	1	▲1
New Century Forum	–	–	–	–	–	–	–	–	1	1	Steady
Path of Democracy	8,159	0.62	▼0.22	0	–	–	–	–	–	0	Steady
Hong Kong Kindergarten Education Professional Exchange Association	–	–	–	–	2,533	3.81	New	0	–	0	Steady
Independents	65,590	4.96	N/A	1	27,523	41.44	N/A	13	23	37	▲30
Total for pro-Beijing camp	1,240,714	93.77	▲52.69	20	55,701	83.86	▲52.32	29	40	89	▲48
Third Side	4,066	0.31	▼0.31	0	1,400	2.07	N/A	1	–	1	▲1
Independents	78,405	5.93	N/A	0	9,321	13.78	N/A	0	–	0	▼1
Total for non-establishment	82,417	6.23	▼52.69	0	10,721	16.14	▼52.32	1	–	1	Steady
Total	1,323,185	100.00		20	66,422	100.00		30	40	90	▲20
Valid votes	1,323,185	97.96	▼0.46		66,422	94.89	▼1.89				
Invalid votes	27,495	2.04	▲0.46		3,580	5.11	▲1.89				
Votes cast / turnout	1,350,680	30.20	▼28.08		70,002	31.93 (Note: Turnout is at 32.22% if votes in Labour constituency are included, which gives ▼42.11pp change in turnout.)	▼42.40				
Registered voters	4,472,863	100.00	▲18.36		219,254	100.00	▼5.70				

=== Votes summary ===
Votes, of total, by camp
1. Pro-Beijing (93.8%)
2. Non-establishment (6.23%)
Seats, of total, by camp
1. Pro-Beijing (98.9%)
2. Non-establishment (1.11%)

Popular vote
DAB	51.43%
FTU	14.53%
NPP	11.35%
Roundtable	3.02%
PP	2.89%
KWND	2.78%
New Prospect	2.19%
PD	0.62%
Third Side	0.31%
Independent	10.89%

=== Seats summary ===
Seat
DAB	21.11%
FTU	8.89%
BPA	7.78%
NPP	5.56%
Liberal	4.44%
FEW	2.22%
FLU	2.22%
Roundtable	1.11%
PP	1.11%
KWND	1.11%
New Prospect	1.11%
Third Side	1.11%
New Forum	1.11%
Independent	41.11%

=== Incumbents defeated ===
Two incumbents lost re-election.

Party	Name	Constituency
BPA (1)	Christopher Cheung	Financial Services
Liberal (1)	Felix Chung	Textiles and Garment

=== Results breakdown ===
==== Election Committee constituency (40 seats) ====
Voting method: Block vote system, each EC member must select 40 candidates. The 40 candidates who obtain the greatest number of votes will be elected.

No.	Candidates	Affiliation	Votes	%
1	Luk Chung-hung	FTU	1,178	82.96
2	Ma Fung-kwok	New Forum	1,234	86.90
3	Kingsley Wong Kwok	FTU	1,192	83.94
4	Chan Hoi-yan	Nonpartisan	1,292	90.99
5	Tang Fei	FEW	1,339	94.30
6	Michael John Treloar Rowse	Nonpartisan	454	31.97
7	Paul Tse Wai-chun	Independent	1,283	90.35
8	Diu Sing-hung	Nonpartisan	342	24.08
9	Tseng Chin-i	Nonpartisan	919	64.72
10	Nelson Lam Chi-yuen	Nonpartisan	970	68.31
11	Peter Douglas Koon Ho-ming	Nonpartisan	1,102	77.61
12	Andrew Lam Siu-lo	Nonpartisan	1,026	72.25
13	Chow Man-kong	Nonpartisan	1,060	74.65
14	Doreen Kong Yuk-foon	Nonpartisan	1,032	72.68
15	Fung Wai-kwong	Nonpartisan	708	49.86
16	Chan Yuet-ming	Nonpartisan	1,187	83.59
17	Hoey Simon Lee	Nonpartisan	1,308	92.11
18	Judy Chan Kapui	NPP	1,284	90.42
19	Wong Chi-him	Nonpartisan	956	67.32
20	Maggie Chan Man-ki	Nonpartisan	1,331	93.73
21	So Cheung-wing	Nonpartisan	1,013	71.34
22	Sun Dong	Nonpartisan	1,124	79.15
23	Tu Hai-ming	Nonpartisan	834	58.73
24	Tan Yueheng	Nonpartisan	1,245	87.68
25	Johnny Ng Kit-chong	Nonpartisan	1,239	87.25
26	Chan Siu-hung	Nonpartisan	1,239	87.25
27	Wendy Hong Wen	Nonpartisan	1,142	80.42
28	Dennis Lam Shun-chiu	Nonpartisan	1,157	81.48
29	Rock Chen Chung-nin	DAB	1,297	91.34
30	Eunice Yung Hoi-yan	NPP/CF	1,313	92.46
31	Chan Pui-leung	Nonpartisan	1,205	84.86
32	Lau Chi-pang	Nonpartisan	1,214	85.49
33	Carmen Kan Wai-mun	Nonpartisan	1,291	90.92
34	Nixie Lam Lam	DAB	1,181	83.17
35	Benson Luk Hon-man	BPA	1,059	74.58
36	Elizabeth Quat	DAB	1,322	93.10
37	Lillian Kwok Ling-lai	DAB	1,122	79.01
38	Lai Tung-kwok	NPP	1,237	87.11
39	Leung Mei-fun	BPA/KWND	1,348	94.93
40	Junius Ho Kwan-yiu	Nonpartisan	1,263	88.94
41	Chan Hoi-wing	DAB	941	66.27
42	Alice Mak Mei-kuen	FTU	1,326	93.38
43	Kevin Sun Wei-yung	Independent	891	62.75
44	Stephen Wong Yuen-shan	Nonpartisan	1,305	91.90
45	Lee Chun-keung	Liberal	1,060	74.65
46	Cheung Kwok-kwan	DAB	1,342	94.51
47	Kenneth Leung Yuk-wai	Nonpartisan	1,160	81.69
48	Allan Zeman	Nonpartisan	955	67.25
49	Lam Chun-sing	FLU	1,002	70.56
50	Charles Ng Wang-wai	Nonpartisan	958	67.46
51	Choy Wing-keung	FTU	818	57.61
Valid votes			1,420	99.58
Invalid votes			6	0.42
Votes cast / turnout			1,426	98.48
Registered voters			1,448	100

==== Functional constituencies (30 seats) ====
Voting method: First-past-the-post system, except the Labour constituency using plurality-at-large voting system.

Constituency	Incumbent	Result	No.	Candidate(s)	Votes	Votes %
Heung Yee Kuk	Kenneth Lau Ip-keung (BPA)	Incumbent hold	HYK1	Kenneth Lau Ip-keung (BPA)	119	77.27
Heung Yee Kuk	Kenneth Lau Ip-keung (BPA)	Incumbent hold	HYK2	Mok Kam-kwai (BPA)	35	22.72
Agriculture and Fisheries	Steven Ho Chun-yin (DAB)	Incumbent hold	AF1	Steven Ho Chun-yin (DAB)	117	68.82
Agriculture and Fisheries	Steven Ho Chun-yin (DAB)	Incumbent hold	AF2	Yeung Sheung-chun (Nonpartisan)	53	31.18
Insurance	Chan Kin-por (Nonpartisan)	Incumbent hold	IN1	Chen Zhaonan (Nonpartisan)	24	26.97
Insurance	Chan Kin-por (Nonpartisan)	Incumbent hold	IN2	Chan Kin-por (Nonpartisan)	65	73.03
Transport	Frankie Yick Chi-ming (Liberal)	Incumbent hold	TR1	Alan Chan Chung-yee (Independent)	56	27.59
Transport	Frankie Yick Chi-ming (Liberal)	Incumbent hold	TR2	Frankie Yick Chi-ming (Liberal)	147	72.41
Education	Vacant; Post last held by Ip Kin-yuen	FEW gain	A1	Jessica Man Sze-wing (Independent)	2,054	8.91
Education	Vacant; Post last held by Ip Kin-yuen	FEW gain	A2	James Lam Yat-fung (Nonpartisan)	4,544	19.71
Education	Vacant; Post last held by Ip Kin-yuen	FEW gain	A3	Francis Ting Kin-wa (HKKGEPE)	2,533	10.99
Education	Vacant; Post last held by Ip Kin-yuen	FEW gain	A4	Lam Wing-sze (Nonpartisan)	3,280	14.23
Education	Vacant; Post last held by Ip Kin-yuen	FEW gain	A5	Chu Kwok-keung (FEW)	10,641	46.16
Legal	Vacant; Post last held by Dennis Kwok Wing-hang	Nonpartisan gain	B1	Ambrose Lam San-keung (Nonpartisan)	1,637	70.84
Legal	Vacant; Post last held by Dennis Kwok Wing-hang	Nonpartisan gain	B2	Chen Xiaofeng (Nonpartisan)	674	29.16
Accountancy	Vacant; Post last held by Kenneth Leung Kai-cheong	DAB gain	C1	Ivan Wong Wang-tai (Nonpartisan)	1,981	24.90
Accountancy	Vacant; Post last held by Kenneth Leung Kai-cheong	DAB gain	C2	Yung Kin (Nonpartisan) (Note: This candidate is considered by some media as in non-establishment camp.)	1,065	13.39
Accountancy	Vacant; Post last held by Kenneth Leung Kai-cheong	DAB gain	C3	Florence Poon Man See-yee (Nonpartisan)	1,734	21.80
Accountancy	Vacant; Post last held by Kenneth Leung Kai-cheong	DAB gain	C4	Edmund Wong Chun-sek (DAB)	3,175	39.91
Medical and Health Services	Pierre Chan (Nonpartisan)	Nonpartisan gain	DE1	Chan Chi-chung (Nonpartisan)	2,585	16.27
Medical and Health Services	Pierre Chan (Nonpartisan)	Nonpartisan gain	DE2	Chan Wing-kwong (DAB)	3,446	21.68
Medical and Health Services	Pierre Chan (Nonpartisan)	Nonpartisan gain	DE3	Ho Sung-hon (Nonpartisan)	1,631	10.26
Medical and Health Services	Vacant; Post last held by Joseph Lee Kok-long	Nonpartisan gain	DE4	Scarlett Pong Oi-lan (Nonpartisan)	2,719	17.11
Medical and Health Services	Vacant; Post last held by Joseph Lee Kok-long	Nonpartisan gain	DE5	David Lam Tzit-yuen (Nonpartisan)	5,511	34.68
Engineering	Lo Wai-kwok (BPA)	Incumbent hold	F1	Wong Wai-shun (Nonpartisan)	1,243	24.41
Engineering	Lo Wai-kwok (BPA)	Incumbent hold	F2	Lo Wai-kwok (BPA)	3,849	75.59
Architectural, Surveying, Planning and Landscape	Tony Tse Wai-chuen (Nonpartisan)	Incumbent hold	G1	Tony Tse Wai-chuen (Nonpartisan)	2,266	68.07
Architectural, Surveying, Planning and Landscape	Tony Tse Wai-chuen (Nonpartisan)	Incumbent hold	G2	Chan Chak-bun (Nonpartisan)	1,063	31.93
Labour (3 seats)	Luk Chung-hung (FTU)	Incumbent running for EC; FTU hold	H1	Dennis Leung Tsz-wing (FTU)	373	N/A
Labour (3 seats)	Poon Siu-ping (FLU)	Incumbent retired FLU hold	H2	Chau Siu-chung (FLU)	371	N/A
Labour (3 seats)	Vacant; Post last held by Ho Kai-ming	FTU gain	H3	Lee Kwong-yu (Nonpartisan)	116	N/A
Labour (3 seats)	Vacant; Post last held by Ho Kai-ming	FTU gain	H4	Kwok Wai-keung (FTU)	398	N/A
Social Welfare	Vacant; Post last held by Shiu Ka-chun	Third Side gain	K1	Chu Lai-ling (DAB)	872	35.33
Social Welfare	Vacant; Post last held by Shiu Ka-chun	Third Side gain	K2	Yip Cham-kai (Nonpartisan)	196	7.94
Social Welfare	Vacant; Post last held by Shiu Ka-chun	Third Side gain	K3	Tik Chi-yuen (Third Side)	1,400	56.73
Real Estate and Construction	Abraham Shek Lai-him (BPA)	Incumbent retired Nonpartisan gain	L1	Howard Chao (Nonpartisan)	138	36.32
Real Estate and Construction	Abraham Shek Lai-him (BPA)	Incumbent retired Nonpartisan gain	L2	Loong Hon-biu (Nonpartisan)	242	63.68
Tourism	Yiu Si-wing (Nonpartisan)	Incumbent retired Nonpartisan hold	M1	Ma Yat-chiu (Independent)	13	7.51
Tourism	Yiu Si-wing (Nonpartisan)	Incumbent retired Nonpartisan hold	M2	Yiu Pak-leung (Nonpartisan)	160	92.49
Commercial (First)	Jeffrey Lam Kin-fung (BPA)	Incumbent hold	N1	Edmond Yew Yat-ming (Nonpartisan)	101	13.85
Commercial (First)	Jeffrey Lam Kin-fung (BPA)	Incumbent hold	N2	Jeffrey Lam Kin-fung (BPA)	628	86.15
Commercial (Second)	Martin Liao Cheung-kong (Nonpartisan)	Incumbent hold	P1	Martin Liao Cheung-kong (Nonpartisan)	176	71.26
Commercial (Second)	Martin Liao Cheung-kong (Nonpartisan)	Incumbent hold	P2	David Yip Wing-shing (Nonpartisan)	71	28.74
Commercial (Third)	New constituency	Nonpartisan gain	Q1	Erik Yim Kong (Nonpartisan)	174	61.27
Commercial (Third)	New constituency	Nonpartisan gain	Q2	Yau Wai-kwong (Nonpartisan)	110	38.73
Industrial (First)	Andrew Leung Kwan-yuen (BPA)	Incumbent hold	R1	Andrew Leung Kwan-yuen (BPA)	235	77.81
Industrial (First)	Andrew Leung Kwan-yuen (BPA)	Incumbent hold	R2	Leung Yat-cheong (Liberal)	67	22.19
Industrial (Second)	Ng Wing-ka (BPA)	Incumbent hold	S1	Ng Wing-ka (BPA)	306	82.48
Industrial (Second)	Ng Wing-ka (BPA)	Incumbent hold	S2	Lo Ching-kong (Nonpartisan)	65	17.52
Finance	Chan Chun-ying (Nonpartisan)	Incumbent hold	T1	Chan Chun-ying (Nonpartisan)	51	75.00
Finance	Chan Chun-ying (Nonpartisan)	Incumbent hold	T2	Owens Chan Chi-fai (Nonpartisan)	17	25.00
Financial Services	Christopher Cheung Wah-fung (BPA)	Incumbent lost re-election Nonpartisan gain	U1	Robert Lee Wai-wang (Nonpartisan)	314	65.01
Financial Services	Christopher Cheung Wah-fung (BPA)	Incumbent lost re-election Nonpartisan gain	U2	Christopher Cheung Wah-fung (BPA)	169	34.99
Sports, Performing Arts, Culture and Publication	Ma Fung-kwok (NCF)	Incumbent running for EC; Nonpartisan gain	V1	William So Wai-leung (Nonpartisan)	29	12.95
Sports, Performing Arts, Culture and Publication	Ma Fung-kwok (NCF)	Incumbent running for EC; Nonpartisan gain	V2	Kenneth Fok Kai-kong (Nonpartisan)	195	87.05
Import and Export	Wong Ting-kwong (DAB)	Incumbent retired DAB hold	W1	Michael Li Chi-fung (Nonpartisan)	48	30.77
Import and Export	Wong Ting-kwong (DAB)	Incumbent retired DAB hold	W2	Kennedy Wong Ying-ho (DAB)	108	69.23
Textiles and Garment	Chung Kwok-pan (Liberal)	Incumbent lost re-election Nonpartisan gain	X1	Sunny Tan (Nonpartisan)	172	67.72
Textiles and Garment	Chung Kwok-pan (Liberal)	Incumbent lost re-election Nonpartisan gain	X2	Chung Kwok-pan (Liberal)	82	32.28
Wholesale and Retail	Shiu Ka-fai (Liberal)	Incumbent hold	Y1	Lam Chi-wing (Nonpartisan)	112	9.12
Wholesale and Retail	Shiu Ka-fai (Liberal)	Incumbent hold	Y2	Shiu Ka-fai (Liberal)	1,116	90.88
Technology and Innovation	Vacant; Post last held by Charles Peter Mok as representative for Information Technology	Nonpartisan gain	Z1	Wu Chili (Nonpartisan)	12	16.90
Technology and Innovation	Vacant; Post last held by Charles Peter Mok as representative for Information Technology	Nonpartisan gain	Z2	Duncan Chiu Tat-kun (Nonpartisan)	59	83.10
Catering	Tommy Cheung Yu-yan (Liberal)	Incumbent hold	CA1	Rayman Chui Man-wai (Independent)	27	21.09
Catering	Tommy Cheung Yu-yan (Liberal)	Incumbent hold	CA2	Tommy Cheung Yu-yan (Liberal)	101	78.91
HKSAR members of NPC and CPPCC, representatives of national organisations	New constituency	DAB gain	ZN1	Chan Yung (DAB/NTAS)	432	70.94
HKSAR members of NPC and CPPCC, representatives of national organisations	New constituency	DAB gain	ZN2	Tse Hiu-hung (Nonpartisan)	177	29.06

==== Geographical constituencies (20 seats) ====
Voting method: Double seats and single vote system, each constituency returns two members, and each voter can vote for one candidate. The two candidates who obtain the greatest number of votes will be elected.

Constituency	No.	Candidates	Affiliation	Align.	Votes	%
Hong Kong Island East	1	Edward Leung Hei	DAB	B	26,799	20.79
Hong Kong Island East	2	Liu Tin-shing	NPP	B	23,171	17.97
Hong Kong Island East	3	Ng Chau-pei	FTU	B	64,509	50.04
Hong Kong Island East	4	Jason Poon Chuk-hung	Independent	N/C	14,435	11.20
Hong Kong Island East	Total				128,914	100.00
Hong Kong Island West	1	Regina Ip Lau Suk-yee	NPP	B	65,694	59.52
Hong Kong Island West	2	Chan Hok-fung	DAB	B	36,628	33.18
Hong Kong Island West	3	Fong Lung-fei	Ind. democrat	N/D	8,058	7.30
Hong Kong Island West	Total				110,380	100.00
Kowloon East	1	Tang Ka-piu	FTU	B	65,036	44.11
Kowloon East	2	Ngan Man-yu	DAB	B	64,275	43.59
Kowloon East	3	Chan Chun-hung	PoD	B/C	2,999	2.03
Kowloon East	4	Wu Kin-wa	Nonpartisan	N	3,090	2.10
Kowloon East	5	Li Ka-yan	Nonpartisan	B	12,049	8.17
Kowloon East	Total				147,449	100.00
Kowloon West	1	Leung Man-kwong	KWND	B	36,840	31.45
Kowloon West	2	Frederick Fung Kin-kee	Nonpartisan	N/C	15,961	13.62
Kowloon West	3	Vincent Cheng Wing-shun	DAB	B	64,353	54.93
Kowloon West	Total				117,154	100.00
Kowloon Central	1	Starry Lee Wai-king	DAB	B	95,976	68.70
Kowloon Central	2	Yang Wing-kit	Nonpartisan	B	35,702	25.56
Kowloon Central	3	Tam Heung-man	Nonpartisan	N/D	8,028	5.75
Kowloon Central	Total				139,706	100.00
New Territories South East	1	Daryl Choi Ming-hei	Nonpartisan	N/D	6,718	5.27
New Territories South East	2	Li Sai-wing	DAB/NTAS	B	82,595	64.77
New Territories South East	3	Lam So-wai	PP	B	38,214	29.97
New Territories South East	Total				127,527	100.00
New Territories North	1	Zhang Xinyu	New Prospect	B	28,986	23.97
New Territories North	2	Lau Kwok-fan	DAB	B	70,584	58.38
New Territories North	3	Shum Ho-kit	Independent	B	17,839	14.75
New Territories North	4	Judy Tzeng Li-wen	Nonpartisan	N	3,498	2.89
New Territories North	Total				120,907	100.00
New Territories North West	1	Holden Chow Ho-ding	DAB/NTAS	B	93,195	67.89
New Territories North West	2	Michael Tien Puk-sun	Roundtable	B	40,009	29.15
New Territories North West	3	Wong Chun-long	Third Side	N/C	4,066	2.96
New Territories North West	Total				137,270	100.00
New Territories South West	1	Lau Cheuk-yu	Ind. democrat	N/D	12,828	8.08
New Territories South West	2	Chan Han-pan	DAB	B	83,303	52.45
New Territories South West	3	Joephy Chan Wing-yan	FTU	B	62,690	39.47
New Territories South West	Total				158,821	100.00
New Territories North East	1	Dominic Lee Tsz-king	NPP/CF	B	61,253	45.35
New Territories North East	2	Wong Sing-chi	Ind. democrat	N/C	5,789	4.29
New Territories North East	3	Chan Hak-kan	DAB/NTAS	B	62,855	46.55
New Territories North East	4	Allan Wong Wing-ho	PoD	B/C	5,160	3.82
New Territories North East	Total				135,057	100.00

== Criticism ==
=== Domestic ===
The election was criticised for lack of energy on display, described by the South China Morning Post as "No banners, no noises" on its headline, drawing a big contrast to the months of vigorous street campaigns in the previous elections.

Political scientist and pundit Ivan Choy criticised the election as "an election with Chinese characteristics" and "rigged", as the election results had already been predetermined before the polls. He pointed out that the Beijing government had tight control over the nomination process through the Election Committee, in which the "nominating" became the deciding factor of the election rather than "voting", getting more and more similar to the Chinese electoral system. Choy also observed that the appearance of the competitiveness of which no constituency was left uncontested was a deliberate outcome of Beijing's coordination, in which the other candidate would not win but merely act as window dressing. The unusual practices of the pro-Beijing parties being discreet about their election plans and late in launching their unenergised campaigns had also shown that Beijing had taken full control of coordinating candidates from the parties who would face little to no challenge in the general election.

=== International ===
A joint statement from representatives of each Five Eyes nation (the Foreign Ministers of Australia, Canada, New Zealand, and the United Kingdom and the US Secretary of State) noted "grave concern over the erosion of democratic elements of the Special Administrative Region's electoral system" and went on to note the lack of real political opposition and shrinking civil liberties. A joint statement from the Group of Seven nations likewise noted "grave concern" about Hong Kong's elections. In response, the Chinese Government claimed the Hong Kong elections were fair and criticised the Five Eyes for interfering in Hong Kong's affairs.

The European Union described the changes made to Hong Kong's electoral system as a "violation of democratic principles and political pluralism" and called on Chinese and Hong Kong authorities to honor "the commitment to democratic representation through universal suffrage".

A Bloomberg editorial slammed the election as "stage-managed" in which the Chinese authoritarian regime sought to confer legitimacy by proclaiming a democratic mandate. It pointed out that the election was a mechanism for co-opting new pro-Beijing interest groups into the power structure, and on the other hand diluting the influence of traditional elites perceived as insufficiently loyal during the protests. It also compared Hong Kong's elections to the one-party rules in Vietnam and Laos rather than a controlled democracy such as Singapore where a sizable contingent opposition was allowed.

== Aftermath ==
Hours after the announcement of election results, the Chinese Government unveiled a white paper, claiming Hong Kong was now entering a new stage of "restored order" as a result of these Beijing-introduced changes. The white paper is the second of its kind to be released by Beijing on Hong Kong's political reforms.

As none of the non-establishment candidates entered the Legislative Council through directly-elected constituencies, analysts believed both the pro-democracy camp and the "centrist" (or moderate) faction are no longer represented in Hong Kong institutions.

Felix Chung from the conservative Liberal Party is expected to leave his post as the party leader after his defeat in re-election, as both the chairperson and leader of the party must be members of the Legislative Council per customs. Yeung Yuk, who supported Frederick Fung in the campaign and angered some pro-democracy activists, resigned as the acting chairperson of the Hong Kong Association for Democracy and People's Livelihood, citing his wish to focus on local issues.

== See also ==
- 2021 Macanese legislative election
- 2022 President of the Hong Kong Legislative Council election
