= Paul Tse =

Hong Kong solicitor

The Honourable Paul Tse Wai-chun JP
- 謝偉俊
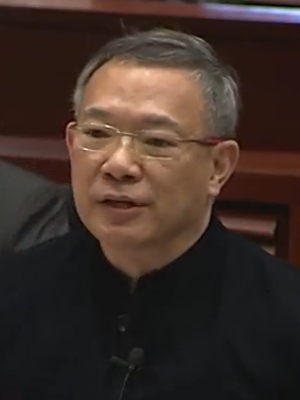
- Tse in 2021

Member of the Legislative Council
- In office 1 January 2022 – 31 December 2025
- Constituency: Election Committee
- In office 1 October 2012 – 31 December 2021
- Preceded by: Constituency created
- Succeeded by: Constituency abolished
- Constituency: Kowloon East
- In office 1 October 2008 – 30 September 2012
- Preceded by: Howard Young
- Succeeded by: Yiu Si-wing
- Constituency: Tourism

Personal details
- Born: 21 January 1959 (age 67) Hong Kong
- Spouse: Pamela Peck
- Education: Wah Yan College, Kowloon
- Alma mater: University of New South Wales (BBA, LL.B.); University of Hong Kong (PCLL); City University of Hong Kong (LL.M.); Renmin University
- Occupation: Solicitor

Paul Tse
- Traditional Chinese: 謝偉俊
- Simplified Chinese: 谢伟俊
- Cantonese Yale: Jeh Wáih-jeun
Transcriptions
Standard Mandarin
- Hanyu Pinyin: Xiè Wěijùn
Yue: Cantonese
- Yale Romanization: Jeh Wáih-jeun

Paul Tse Wai-chun, JP (Chinese: 謝偉俊, born 1959) is a Hong Kong solicitor and politician. Self claiming the "Superman of Law", he was elected to the Legislative Council of Hong Kong in 2008 through the tourism functional constituency as an owner of a small travel agency, before standing and re-elected in 2012 at Kowloon East constituency, and subsequently the revived Election Committee constituency in 2021.

== Legal career ==
He practised law as a barrister in Australia for seven years after graduating from University of New South Wales.

Tse then finished his pupillage in Hong Kong under Justice Peter Nguyen. Tse was called to the bar in 1992 and set up his own firm in 1997.

His media stunts and quest for self-publicity have caused controversy. From 1997 to 1999, Paul posed in his underpants only for magazines to spread the message that "laws are inherent to every people". After disciplinary hearings which lasted for nearly a decade, the Law Society of Hong Kong suspended his solicitor's license for 12 months for this stunt, but his firm could continue because there were other partners.

== Political career ==
Tse joined the politics by ran as an independent candidate in the 2000 Legislative Council election for Hong Kong Island constituency, imitating the "Superwoman of Law" image played by Carol Cheng in the TVB drama War of the Genders, promoting himself as a "Superman of Law", but he was defeated. He later ran for the Tourism constituency in the 2004 Hong Kong Legislative Council election but was defeated by a margin of 54 votes.

In the 2008 Legislative Council election, he ran again for the Tourism constituency and narrowly defeated Tung Yiu-chung, the then Director-General of the Travel Industry Council, by only 9 votes to win a seat and become a Legislative Council member.

In 2010, Tse was the sole legislator to vote against the introduction of a minimum wage in Hong Kong.

In 2012, Tse ran for the Kowloon East constituency seat. He defeated Wong Yeung-tat of People Power and Andrew To of the League of Social Democrats, who were vying for votes, and successfully won the last seat .

In February 2021, Tse said that Sinopharm vaccines should be administered in Hong Kong, despite the fact that the trial data had not been released.

Also in February 2021, Tse announced potential reductions of power held by Legislative Council members, claiming that the reductions would create a "balance between the effective operation of the council and the right of speech of legislators." In response, Andrew Wan said that such changes would serve only to minimize any antigovernmental opposition within the legislature. Tse also said that lawmakers could be banned for a week if they violated any of the new rules, and that the new rules could take effect as soon as 24 March 2021.

In April 2021, Tse said that people who urge others to cast blank ballots may commit the crime of "inciting subversion" under the National Security Law.

In January 2022, Tse said that he would try to introduce legislation to block the "yellow economic circle", where pro-democracy supporters boycott shopping at pro-government businesses.

In June 2023, Tse introduced legislation that would give lawmakers a summer break.

In January 2024, during question time in the Legislative Council, Tse criticised the government and said that "law enforcement forces have seemingly given the public the impression that they value the online opinions of Xiaohongshu users, who are not taxpayers, more than Hong Kong citizens, who actually pay tax." Tse said earlier that government actions to placate mainland Chinese netizens would lead to "Xiaohongshu administering Hong Kong," an allusion to "patriots administering Hong Kong." In his response, Chief Executive John Lee compared Tse's language to that used in the "black-clad violence of 2019" and said that Tse's words reminded him of "soft resistance", warning that it was "dangerous" to spread "false and negative information" about the government's efforts, accusing Tse of stirring up trouble. In late March 2024, after the passing of the Safeguarding National Security Ordinance earlier that month, Tse said he had deleted his Facebook page due to his concern that comments he had made on Xiaohongshu and other matters violated the ordinance. His page was up again before the end of the month, but with all posts invisible or hidden.

Considered to be one of the outspoken members in the opposition-free chamber, Tse did not seek re-election in 2025, saying that "silence speaks louder than words".

== Personal life ==
Tse was born in Shap Pat Heung, Yuen Long, New Territories, Hong Kong, into a working-class family. His family lives in New Jersey, United States. Tse is of Hakka ancestry.

Out of all 90 legislative council members in the 2022-2025 term, Tse owned the most properties, with 15 residential units in Hong Kong and one in Beijing.

Legislative Council of Hong Kong
Preceded by Howard Young	Member of Legislative Council; Representative for Tourism; 2008–2012	Succeeded by Yiu Si-wing
New seat	Member of Legislative Council; Representative for Kowloon East; 2012–2021	Seat abolished
New seat	Member of Legislative Council; Representative for Election Committee; 2022–2025	Succeeded by Yiu Pak-leung
Political offices
Preceded by Pamela Peck	Member of Wan Chai District Council; Representative for Broadwood; 2016–present	Incumbent
Order of precedence
Preceded by Priscilla Leung; Member of the Legislative Council	Hong Kong order of precedence Member of the Legislative Council	Succeeded by Claudia Mo; Member of the Legislative Council
