= HKSAR members of NPC and CPPCC, representatives of national organisations (constituency) =

Voter constituency in Hong Kong legislative elections

Hong Kong Special Administrative Region deputies to the National People's Congress, HKSAR members of the National Committee of the Chinese People's Political Consultative Conference and representatives of relevant national organisations 香港特別行政區全國人大代表香港特別行政區全國政協委員及有關全國性團體代表界
- Functional constituency for the Legislative Council of Hong Kong
- Region: Hong Kong
- Electorate: 557

Current constituency
- Created: 2021
- Number of members: One
- Member: Chan Yung (DAB)
- Created from: District Council (First)

The Hong Kong Special Administrative Region deputies to the National People's Congress, HKSAR members of the National Committee of the Chinese People's Political Consultative Conference and representatives of relevant national organisations functional constituency (Chinese: 香港特別行政區全國人大代表香港特別行政區全國政協委員及有關全國性團體代表界功能界別), also known as HKSAR members of NPC and CPPCC, representatives of national organisations functional constituency (Chinese: 港區人大政協及有關全國性團體代表界), is a functional constituency in the elections for the Legislative Council of Hong Kong first created in 2021. The constituency is composed of Hong Kong deputies to the National People's Congress (NPC), members of the National Committee of the Chinese People's Political Consultative Conference (CPPCC), delegates of the All-China Women's Federation, executive members of the All-China Federation of Industry and Commerce, committee members of the All-China Federation of Returned Overseas Chinese, committee members of the All-China Youth Federation, and directors of the China Overseas Friendship Association.

== Return members ==
Election	Member	Party
2021	Chan Yung	DAB
2025	Chan Yung	DAB

== Electoral results ==
=== 2020s ===
2025 Legislative Council election: Hong Kong Special Administrative Region deputies to the National People's Congress, HKSAR members of the National Committee of the Chinese People's Political Consultative Conference and representatives of relevant national organisations
Party	Candidate	Votes	%	±%
DAB (NTAS)	Chan Yung	414	77.38	+6.44
Independent	Rex Lai Tat-shing	121	22.62	
Majority		293	54.76	
Total valid votes		535	100.00	
Rejected ballots		4		
Turnout		539	96.77	+5.32
Registered electors		557		
DAB hold		Swing		

2021 Legislative Council election: Hong Kong Special Administrative Region deputies to the National People's Congress, HKSAR members of the National Committee of the Chinese People's Political Consultative Conference and representatives of relevant national organisations
Party	Candidate	Votes	%	±%
DAB (NTAS)	Chan Yung	432	70.94	
Independent	Tse Hiu-hung	177	29.06	
Majority		255	41.88	
Total valid votes		609	100.00	
Rejected ballots		11		
Turnout		620	91.45	
Registered electors		678		
DAB win (new seat)				
