= Real Estate and Construction (constituency) =

Hong Kong functional constituency

Real Estate and Construction 地產及建造界
- Functional constituency for the Legislative Council of Hong Kong
- Region: Hong Kong
- Electorate: 557

Current constituency
- Created: 1991
- Number of members: One
- Member: Augustine Wong (Independent)

The Real Estate and Construction functional constituency (Chinese: 地產及建造界功能界別) is a functional constituency in the elections for the Legislative Council of Hong Kong first created in 1991. The constituency is composed of 463 corporate members of the Real Estate Developers Association of Hong Kong, Hong Kong Construction Association, and Hong Kong E&M Contractors' Association to vote at general meetings of the Associations. Prior to the 2021 electoral overhaul, the eligible voters included individual members.

== Return members ==
Election	Member	Party
1991	Ronald Arculli	Independent→Liberal
1995	Ronald Arculli	Liberal
Not represented in the PLC (1997–1998)
1998	Ronald Arculli	Liberal
2000	Abraham Shek	Independent
2004	Abraham Shek	Independent→Alliance
2008	Abraham Shek	Alliance→Professional Forum
2012	Abraham Shek	Professional Forum→BPA
2016	Abraham Shek	BPA
2021	Louis Loong	Independent→BPA
2025	Augustine Wong	Independent

== Electoral results ==
=== 2020s ===
2025 Legislative Council election: Real Estate and Construction
Party	Candidate	Votes	%	±%
Independent	Augustine Wong Ho-ming	316	67.81	
BPA	Howard Chao	150	32.19	
Majority		166	35.62	
Total valid votes		466	100.00	
Rejected ballots		2		
Turnout		468	84.02	+0.83
Registered electors		557		
Independent gain from BPA		Swing		

2021 Legislative Council election: Real Estate and Construction
Party	Candidate	Votes	%	±%
Independent	Louis Loong Hon-biu	242	63.68	
Independent	Howard Chao	138	36.32	
Majority		104	27.36	
Total valid votes		380	100.00	
Rejected ballots		1		
Turnout		381	83.19	
Registered electors		463		
Independent gain from BPA		Swing		

=== 2010s ===
2016 Legislative Council election: Real Estate and Construction
Party	Candidate	Votes	%	±%
BPA	Abraham Shek Lai-him	Unopposed		
Registered electors		714		
BPA hold		Swing		

2012 Legislative Council election: Real Estate and Construction
Party	Candidate	Votes	%	±%
Independent	"Abraham Razack" Shek Lai-him	Unopposed		
Registered electors		767		
Independent hold		Swing		

=== 2000s ===
2008 Legislative Council election: Real Estate and Construction
Party	Candidate	Votes	%	±%
Independent	"Abraham Razack" Shek Lai-him	Unopposed		
Registered electors		751		
Independent hold		Swing		

2004 Legislative Council election: Real Estate and Construction
Party	Candidate	Votes	%	±%
Independent	"Abraham Razack" Shek Lai-him	Unopposed		
Registered electors		757		
Independent hold		Swing		

2000 Legislative Council election: Real Estate and Construction
Party	Candidate	Votes	%	±%
Independent	"Abraham Razack" Shek Lai-him	357	75.48	
Independent	Tse Lai-leung	116	22.53	−8.34
Majority		241	52.95	
Total valid votes		473	100.00	
Rejected ballots		12		
Turnout		485	75.08	
Registered electors		646		
Independent gain from Liberal		Swing		

=== 1990s ===
1998 Legislative Council election: Real Estate and Construction
Party	Candidate	Votes	%	±%
Liberal	Ronald Joseph Arculli	206	69.13	
Independent	Tse Lai-leung	92	30.87	
Majority		114	38.26	
Total valid votes		298	100.00	
Rejected ballots		2		
Turnout		300	85.23	
Registered electors		352		
Liberal hold		Swing		

1995 Legislative Council election: Real Estate and Construction
Party	Candidate	Votes	%	±%
Liberal	Ronald Joseph Arculli	Unopposed		
Registered electors		371		
Liberal hold		Swing		

1991 Legislative Council election: Real Estate and Construction
Party	Candidate	Votes	%	±%
Independent	Ronald Joseph Arculli	Unopposed		
Registered electors		373		
Independent win (new seat)				
