= Tourism (constituency) =

Functional constituency of Hong Kong

Tourism 旅遊界
- Functional constituency for the Legislative Council of Hong Kong
- Region: Hong Kong
- Electorate: 173

Current constituency
- Created: 1991
- Number of members: One
- Member: Vivian Kong (Independent)

The Tourism functional constituency (Chinese: 旅遊界功能界別) is a functional constituency in the elections for the Legislative Council of Hong Kong first created in 1991.

== Composition ==
After the 2021 electoral overhaul, the Tourism functional constituency is composed of the following bodies—

- Bodies that are—
  - travel agents holding licences as defined by section 2 of the Travel Agents Ordinance (Cap. 218); and
  - Any of the following—
    - Corporate members of the Travel Industry Council of Hong Kong entitled to vote at the Board of Directors of the Council;
    - Corporate members of Hong Kong Association of China Travel Organisers Limited entitled to vote at the Executive Committee of the company;
    - Corporate members of International Chinese Tourist Association Limited entitled to vote at the Executive Committee of the company;
    - Corporate members of The Federation of Hong Kong Chinese Travel Agents Limited entitled to vote at the Executive Committee of the company;
    - Corporate members of Hong Kong Outbound Tour Operators’ Association Limited entitled to vote at the Executive Committee of the company;
    - Corporate members of Hong Kong Association of Travel Agents Limited entitled to vote at the Executive Committee of the company;
    - Corporate members of Hongkong Taiwan Tourist Operators Association entitled to vote at the Executive Committee of the Association;
    - Corporate members of Hongkong Japanese Tour Operators Association Limited entitled to vote at the Executive Committee of the company;
    - Corporate members of Society of IATA Passenger Agents Limited entitled to vote at the Executive Committee of the company; and
- Bodies that are corporate members of The Board of Airline Representatives in Hong Kong entitled to vote at the Executive Committee of the Board; and
- Bodies that are corporate members of the Federation of Hong Kong Hotel Owners Limited entitled to vote at general meetings of the company.

== Return members ==
Election	Member	Party
1991	Howard Young	LDF
1995	Howard Young	Liberal
Not represented in the PLC (1997–1998)
1998	Howard Young	Liberal
2000	Howard Young	Liberal
2004	Howard Young	Liberal
2008	Paul Tse	Independent
2012	Yiu Si-wing	Independent
2016	Yiu Si-wing	Independent
2021	Yiu Pak-leung	Independent
2025	Vivian Kong	Independent

== Electoral results ==
=== 2020s ===
2025 Legislative Council election: Tourism
Party	Candidate	Votes	%	±%
Independent	Vivian Kong Man-wai	131	85.06	
Independent	Ma Yat-chiu	23	14.94	+7.43
Majority		108	70.12	
Total valid votes		154	100.00	
Rejected ballots		1		
Turnout		155	89.60	−0.50
Registered electors		173		
Independent gain from Independent		Swing		

2021 Legislative Council election: Tourism
Party	Candidate	Votes	%	±%
Independent	Yiu Pak-leung	160	92.49	
Independent	Ma Yat-chiu	13	7.51	
Majority		147	84.98	
Total valid votes		173	100.00	
Rejected ballots		0		
Turnout		173	90.10	
Registered electors		192		
Independent gain from Independent		Swing		

=== 2010s ===
2016 Legislative Council election: Tourism
Party	Candidate	Votes	%	±%
Independent	Yiu Si-wing	625	60.86	+16.38
Independent	Freddy Yip Hing-ning	288	28.04	–15.48
Independent	Lam Siu-lun	114	11.10	
Majority		337	32.82	
Total valid votes		1,027	100.00	
Rejected ballots		53		
Turnout		1,080	80.24	+1.87
Registered electors		1,346		
Independent hold		Swing		

2012 Legislative Council election: Tourism
Party	Candidate	Votes	%	±%
Independent	Yiu Si-wing	523	56.48	
Independent	Freddy Yip Hing-ning	403	43.52	+25.06
Majority		120	12.96	
Total valid votes		926	100.00	
Rejected ballots		38		
Turnout		964	78.37	+6.28
Registered electors		1,230		
Independent gain from Independent		Swing		

=== 2000s ===
2008 Legislative Council election: Tourism
Party	Candidate	Votes	%	±%
Independent	Paul Tse Wai-chun	324	36.69	−4.06
Liberal	Tung Yiu-chung	315	35.67	
Independent	Freddy Yip Hing-ning	163	18.46	
Civic	Paulus Johannes Zimmerman	81	9.17	
Majority		9	1.02	
Total valid votes		883	100.00	
Rejected ballots		26		
Turnout		909	72.09	
Registered electors		1,261		
Independent gain from Liberal		Swing		

2004 Legislative Council election: Tourism
Party	Candidate	Votes	%	±%
Liberal	Howard Young	349	48.20	+3.13
Independent	Paul Tse Wai-chun	295	40.75	
Independent	Freddy Yip Hing-ning	80	11.05	
Majority		54	7.45	
Total valid votes		724	100.00	
Rejected ballots		53		
Turnout		741	76.87	
Registered electors		964		
Independent hold		Swing		

2000 Legislative Council election: Tourism
Party	Candidate	Votes	%	±%
Liberal	Howard Young	274	45.07	
Independent	Tung Yiu-chung	197	32.40	
Independent	Pak Ka-man	137	22.53	
Majority		77	12.67	
Total valid votes		608	100.00	
Rejected ballots		53		
Turnout		613	76.05	
Registered electors		806		
Liberal hold		Swing		

=== 1990s ===
1998 Legislative Council election: Tourism
Party	Candidate	Votes	%	±%
Liberal	Howard Young	Unopposed		
Rejected ballots		838		
Liberal win (new seat)				

1995 Legislative Council election: Tourism
Party	Candidate	Votes	%	±%
Liberal	Howard Young	413	70.24	+29.57
Independent	Hau Suk-kei	175	29.76	
Majority		238	40.48	
Total valid votes		588	100.00	
Rejected ballots		8		
Turnout		596	69.95	
Registered electors		852		
Liberal hold		Swing		

1991 Legislative Council election: Tourism
Party	Candidate	Votes	%	±%
LDF	Howard Young	338	40.67	
LDF	Ng Tan	318	38.27	
Independent	Yuen Ka-chai	175	21.06	
Majority		20	2.40	
Turnout		728	85.95	
Registered electors		847		
LDF win (new seat)				
