= Ping Tin (constituency) =

Constituency in Hong Kong

- 平田
- Elected constituency for the Kwun Tong District Council
- Boundary of Ping Tin in Kwun Tong District
- District: Kwun Tong
- Legislative Council constituency: Kowloon East
- Population: 17,697 (2019)
- Electorate: 12,035 (2019)

Current constituency
- Created: 1999
- Number of members: One
- Member: Vacant

Ping Tin
- Traditional Chinese: 平田
Transcriptions
Yue: Cantonese
- Yale Romanization: Pìhng tìhn
- Jyutping: Ping4 tin4

Ping Tin is one of the 37 constituencies in the Kwun Tong District of Hong Kong which was created in 1999.

The constituency has an estimated population of 17,697.

== Councillors represented ==
| Election | Member | Party |
|---|---|---|
| 1999 | Chan Cheong | Independent |
| 2007 | Perry Yiu Pak-leung | New Forum |
| 20?? | Perry Yiu Pak-leung | Independent |
| 2019 | Eason Chan Yik-shun | Independent democrat |

== Election results ==
=== 2010s ===
Kwun Tong District Council Election, 2019: Ping Tin
| Party | Candidate | Votes | % | ±% |
|---|---|---|---|---|
| Ind. democrat | Eason Chan Yik-shun | 4,490 | 52.81 | |
| Independent | Perry Yiu Pak-leung | 4,012 | 47.19 | |
| Majority | | 478 | 5.62 | |
| Turnout | | 8,523 | 70.85 | |
| Ind. democrat gain from Independent | | Swing | | |
