= Chan Yung =

Hong Kong politician (born 1969)

Brave Chan Yung BBS, JP
- 陳勇
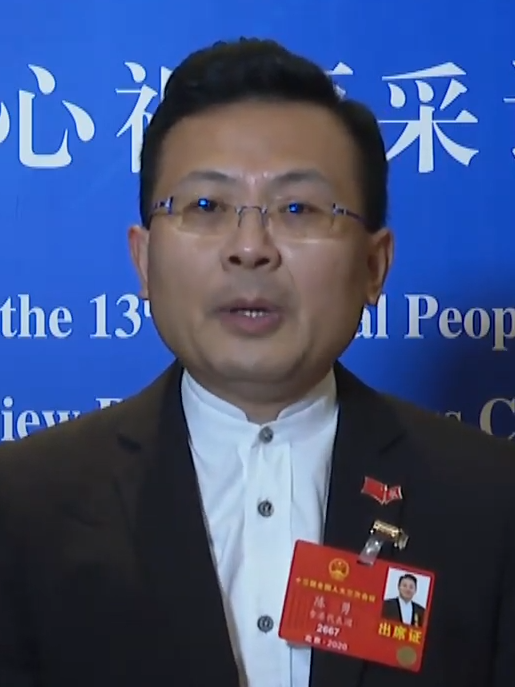
- Chan in 2020

Vice-Chairman of the Democratic Alliance for the Betterment and Progress of Hong Kong
- Incumbent
- Assumed office 19 April 2013
- Chairman: Tam Yiu-chung; Starry Lee
- Preceded by: Lau Kong-wah

Chairman of the New Territories Association of Societies
- Incumbent
- Assumed office April 2011
- President: Leung Che-cheung
- Preceded by: Wan Yuet-kau

Member of the Legislative Council
- Incumbent
- Assumed office 1 January 2022
- Preceded by: New constituency
- Constituency: HKSAR Members of NPC and CPPCC, Representatives of National Organisations

Hong Kong Deputy to the National People's Congress
- Incumbent
- Assumed office February 2013
- Chairman: Zhang Dejiang; Li Zhanshu

Member of the North District Council
- Incumbent
- Assumed office 1 January 2008
- Appointed by: Donald Tsang

Personal details
- Born: 24 September 1969 (age 56)
- Party: Democratic Alliance for the Betterment and Progress of Hong Kong (DAB); New Territories Association of Societies (NTAS)
- Education: CCC Chuen Yuen College; City University of Hong Kong; Chinese University of Hong Kong
- Occupation: Social worker Politician

Chinese name
- Traditional Chinese: 陳勇
- Simplified Chinese: 陈勇
Transcriptions
Standard Mandarin
- Hanyu Pinyin: Chén Yǒng
Yue: Cantonese
- Jyutping: can4 jung5

Brave Chan Yung, BBS, JP (Chinese: 陳勇, born 24 September 1969) is a Hong Kong pro-Beijing politician. He is the vice-chairman of the Democratic Alliance for the Betterment and Progress of Hong Kong (DAB) and chairman of the New Territories Association of Societies (NTAS). He has been the Hong Kong deputy to the National People's Congress since 2013, and since 2022 he became a member of the Legislative Council, representing the HKSAR Members of NPC and CPPCC, Representatives of National Organisations constituency, the new constituency created in 2022.

== Career ==
Chan graduated from the City University of Hong Kong with a Bachelor of Social Work. He later obtained a master's degree from the Chinese University of Hong Kong. He has been a registered social worker and participated in many public services. He has also been appointed to many public positions including the member of the Commission on Youth (2003–2009) and Committee on the Promotion of Civic Education, secretary general of the Hong Kong Celebration Association, vice-president of the Federation of New Territories Youth, member of the North District Fight Crime Committee and member of the Hong Kong Professionals and Senior Executives Association. He was also the Hong Kong member of the 10th All-China Youth Federation, a youth organisation led by the Chinese Communist Party. In 2008, he was appointed to the North District Council.

Pang was elected chairman of the New Territories Association of Societies in April 2011. In 2013, he was elected Hong Kong's Deputy to the 12th National People's Congress (NPC) by just 1,620 voters. During his office in the NPC, he urged the mainland authority to ban convicted parallel-goods traders from visiting Hong Kong on the Individual Visit Scheme for up to several years. In the same year, he was made vice-chairman of the DAB.

In February 2014, he was appointed to the Lantau Development Advisory Committee to roll out a series of proposals to improve its infrastructure before the HK$83 billion Hong Kong-Zhuhai-Macau bridge opens in 2016. He cited an instruction from National People's Congress chairman Zhang Dejiang to the Hong Kong and Macau Affairs Office of the State Council to work with the Hong Kong government and "make plans and assess the city's tourism capacity".

He has been the spokesman of the Alliance for Peace and Democracy, the anti-Occupy Central rally group since 2014. He was also made Justice of the Peace in 2011 and was awarded the Bronze Bauhinia Star in 2014.

In December 2022, Chan tested positive for COVID-19.

In January 2023, Chan supported the government's efforts to enact Article 23, stating "Hong Kong should not take a chance and allow foreign proxies to enter the city."

In December 2025, Chan was re-elected as Legislative Councilor through the same constituency.

Legislative Council of Hong Kong
New constituency	Member of Legislative Council; Representative for HKSAR Members of NPC and CPPCC, Representatives of National Organisations; 2022–present	Incumbent
Party political offices
Preceded by Wan Yuet-kau	Chairman of New Territories Association of Societies; 2011–present	Incumbent
Preceded by Lau Kong-wah	Vice Chairman of Democratic Alliance for the Betterment and Progress of Hong Kong; 2013–present Served alongside: Chan Hak-kan, Holden Chow, Horace Cheung, Chan Hok-fung	Incumbent
