= Edward Leung Hei =

Hong Kong politician

The Honourable Edward Leung Hei
- 梁熙
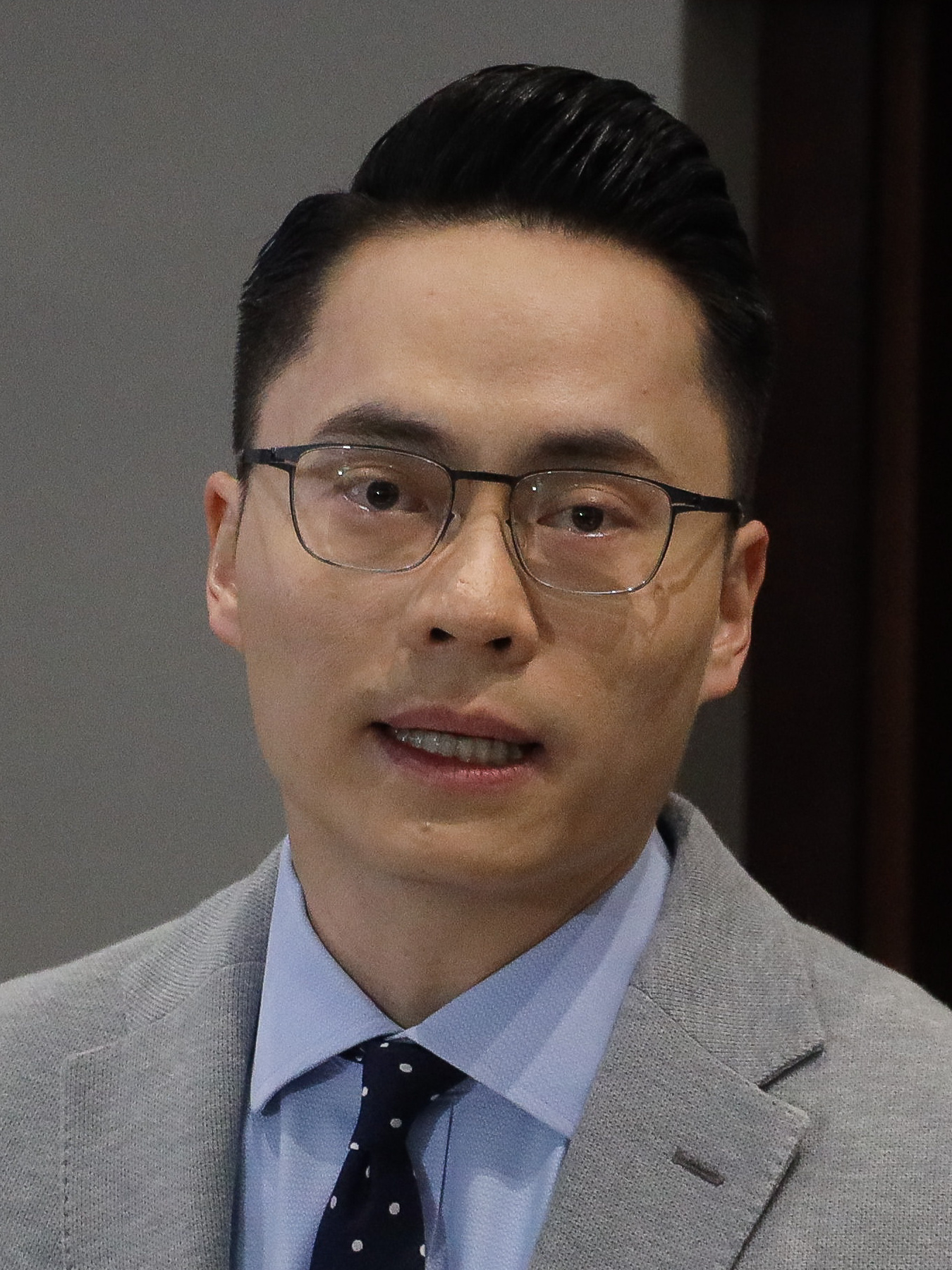
- Leung Hei in 2023

Member of the Legislative Council
- Incumbent
- Assumed office 1 January 2022
- Preceded by: New constituency
- Constituency: Hong Kong Island East

Personal details
- Born: 8 March 1985 (age 41) Hong Kong
- Party: Democratic Alliance for the Betterment and Progress of Hong Kong (DAB)
- Education: University of Southern California; Tsinghua University

Edward Leung Hei (Chinese: 梁熙; born 8 March 1985) is a Hong Kong politician. He is a member of the Legislative Council of Hong Kong for Hong Kong Island East constituency, representing Democratic Alliance for the Betterment and Progress of Hong Kong (DAB).

== Biography ==
Leung was born into a wealthy family. His father, Charles Leung Ying-wai, is a property developer and the chairman of Hong Kong China Development Holdings Ltd. Leung graduated from the University of Southern California with a Bachelor of Science in Business Administration and then obtained a Master of Public Administration from Tsinghua University.

Leung was selected by the Democratic Alliance for the Betterment and Progress of Hong Kong (DAB) to run in Hong Kong Island East in the 2021 Legislative Council election, in which he received 26,799 votes and gained the second seat in the constituency.

Legislative Council of Hong Kong
New constituency	Member of Legislative Council; Representative for Hong Kong Island East; 2022–present	Incumbent
