= Howard Young (politician) =

Howard Young How Wah (Chinese: 楊孝華, born 30 March 1948 in Hong Kong with family roots in Xinhui, Guangdong) was a member of the Legislative Council of Hong Kong (Functional constituencies, Tourism) and the member of Southern District Council. He is a member of Liberal Party. He works as a general manager in Cathay Pacific Airways.

In May 2008, his younger son, Jeremy Young Chit On, was appointed to be the political assistant for Food and Health by the Hong Kong SAR Government.

== Honours ==
In 2003, Young was awarded the Silver Bauhinia Star by the Hong Kong SAR Government.

Legislative Council of Hong Kong
New constituency	Member of Legislative Council; Representative for Tourism; 1991–1997	Replaced by Provisional Legislative Council
New parliament	Member of Provisional Legislative Council; 1997–1998	Replaced by Legislative Council
New parliament	Member of Legislative Council; Representative for Tourism; 1998–2008	Succeeded by Paul Tse
