= Louis Loong =

Hong Kong politician

The Honourable Louis Loong
- 龍漢標
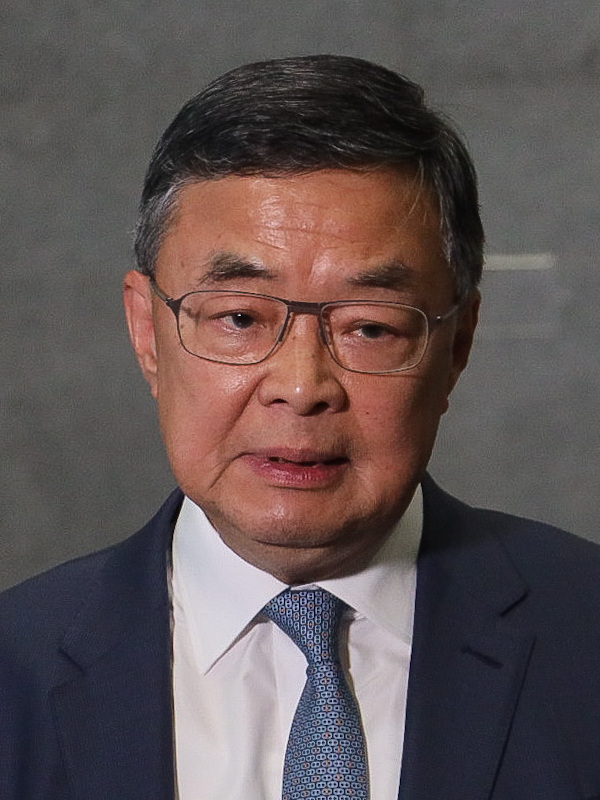
- Loong in 2023

Member of the Legislative Council
- In office 1 January 2022 – 31 December 2025
- Preceded by: Abraham Shek
- Succeeded by: Wong Ho Ming Augustine
- Constituency: Real Estate and Construction

Louis Loong Hon-biu (Chinese: 龍漢標) is the secretary general of the Real Estate Developers Association of Hong Kong. He is also a politician and former member of Hong Kong Legislative Council from 2022 to 2025 representing Real Estate and Construction functional constituency. He is a member of BPA.

== Electoral history ==
2021 Legislative Council election: Technology and Innovation
Party	Candidate	Votes	%	±%
Nonpartisan	Loong Hon-biu	242	63.68	
Nonpartisan	Chao Howard	138	36.32	
Majority		104	27.47	
Total valid votes		380		
Turnout				
Registered electors		463		
Nonpartisan win				

Legislative Council of Hong Kong
Preceded by Abraham Shek	Member of Legislative Council; Representative for Real Estate and Construction; 2022–present	Incumbent
