= Yiu Si-wing =

Director at China Travel Service

The Honourable Yiu Si-wing BBS
- 姚思榮
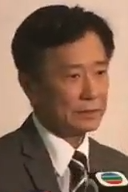

Member of the Legislative Council
- In office 1 October 2012 – 31 December 2021
- Preceded by: Paul Tse
- Succeeded by: Yiu Pak-leung
- Constituency: Tourism

Personal details
- Born: 1955 (age 70–71)
- Occupation: Businessman; Politician

Yiu Si-wing BBS (Chinese: 姚思榮, born 1955) is a director at China Travel Service and a former member of Legislative Council of Hong Kong.

== Background ==
Yiu began his career in China Travel Service in 1973. In 2011, he joined the Election Committee for Tourism constituency. Yiu was elected as a member of Legislative Council of Hong Kong in 2012 and continued to hold this office until December 2021.

He is a known supporter of former Chief Executive Leung Chun-ying.

== Calling for arrest of illegal tour guides ==
In November 2018, shortly after the opening of the Hong Kong–Zhuhai–Macau Bridge, a large number of tourists from mainland China stayed in Tung Chung district, leading to complaints of local residents about overcrowding. Yiu said that he had asked the Security Bureau to instruct the police to arrest illegal mainland tour guides who had not worked with the legally required Hong Kong license.

Legislative Council of Hong Kong
Preceded by Paul Tse	Member of Legislative Council; Representative for Tourism; 2012–2021	Succeeded by Yiu Pak-leung
Order of precedence
Preceded by Wu Chi-wai; Member of the Legislative Council	Hong Kong order of precedence Member of the Legislative Council	Succeeded by Ma Fung-kwok; Member of the Legislative Council
