= New Territories Association of Societies =

New Territories Association of Societies 新界社團聯會
- Abbreviation: NTAS
- President: Leung Che-cheung
- Chairman: Chan Yung
- Founded: 1985
- Headquarters: 9/F, Tai Po; Commercial Centre, 152–172 Kwong; Fuk Road, Tai Po, New Territories
- Ideology: Conservatism (HK); Chinese nationalism New Territories regionalism
- Regional affiliation: Pro-Beijing camp
- Colors: Blue and orange
- Legislative Council: 5 / 90
- District Councils: 0 / 470
- NPC (HK deputies): 1 / 36
- CPPCC (HK members): 2 / 124

Website
- www.ntas.org.hk

New Territories Association of Societies
- Traditional Chinese: 新界社團聯會
- Simplified Chinese: 新界社团联会
Transcriptions
Standard Mandarin
- Hanyu Pinyin: Xīnjiè Shètuán Liánhuì
Yue: Cantonese
- Yale Romanization: Sān gaai Séh tyùhn Lyùhn wuih
- Jyutping: San^{1} gaai^{3} Se^{5} tyun^{4} Lyun^{4} wui^{6*2}

Alternative Chinese name
- Traditional Chinese: 新社聯
- Simplified Chinese: 新社联
Transcriptions
Standard Mandarin
- Hanyu Pinyin: Xīnshèlián
Yue: Cantonese
- Yale Romanization: Sān séh lyùhn
- Jyutping: San^{1} se^{5} lyun^{4}

The New Territories Association of Societies (NTAS; Chinese: 新界社團聯會) is a pro-Beijing umbrella political group which consists of hundreds of the New Territories community organisations. The founding president of the Association was Lee Lin-sang, who served as the delegate to the National People's Congress in the 1980s and member of the HKSAR Preparatory Committee before the handover of Hong Kong. The Association plays important coordination roles in the election campaigns for the pro-Beijing camp by mobilising members of its affiliated groups to vote for the pro-Beijing candidates. The Association currently holds two seats in the Legislative Council (LegCo), Leung Che-cheung and Chan Han-pan who are both affiliated with the largest pro-Beijing party Democratic Alliance for the Betterment and Progress of Hong Kong (while Leung does not put NTAS as his political affiliation on his biography). Leung also serves as the current president of the Association.

The current chairman is Chan Yung, a Hong Kong deputy to the National People's Congress.

== Election performances ==
=== Legislative Council elections ===
Election	Number of popular votes	% of popular votes	GC seats	FC seats	ECC seats	Total seats	+/−	Position
2012	DAB ticket		2	0		2 / 70	2▲	N/A
2016	DAB ticket		3	0		3 / 70	0	N/A
2021	DAB ticket		3	0	1	4 / 90	1▲	N/A
2025	41,657	3.26	1	1	2	4 / 90	0	9th

=== District Councils elections ===
Election	Number of popular votes	% of popular votes	Total elected seats	+/−
2011	2,187	0.19	2 / 412	1▲
2015	7,090▲	0.49▲	5 / 431	0
2019	14,066▲	0.48▼	1 / 452	1▼

== See also ==
- United Front Work Department
- United Front (China)
- Politics of Hong Kong
- List of political parties in Hong Kong
