= Abraham Shek =

Hong Kong politician (born 1945)

The Honourable Abraham Shek GBS JP
- 石禮謙
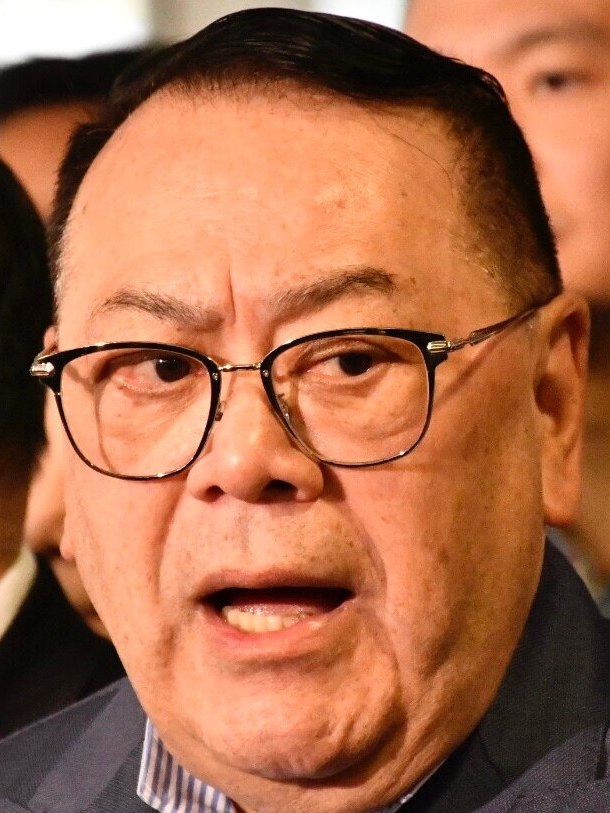
- Shek in 2019

Member of the Legislative Council
- In office 1 October 2000 – 31 December 2021
- Preceded by: Ronald Arculli
- Succeeded by: Loong Hon-biu
- Constituency: Real Estate and Construction

Personal details
- Born: Razack Ebrahim Abdul; 24 June 1945 (age 81) Macau
- Party: Business and Professionals Alliance for Hong Kong; Professional Forum
- Spouse: Lisa Har
- Education: University of Sydney (BA, PGDE)
- Occupation: Company Director

Abraham Shek
- Traditional Chinese: 石禮謙
- Simplified Chinese: 石礼谦
Transcriptions
Standard Mandarin
- Hanyu Pinyin: Shí Lǐqiān
Yue: Cantonese
- Jyutping: sek6 lai5 him1

Abraham Shek Lai-him GBS JP or Abraham Razack (Chinese: 石禮謙; born Razack Ebrahim Abdul; 24 June 1945) is a former member of the Legislative Council of Hong Kong (Legco), representing the real estate and construction industry in a functional constituency seat. He is a member of the political grouping Business and Professionals Alliance for Hong Kong in Legco. He graduated from the University of Sydney in Australia.

Razack is a businessman and former chief executive of the Land Development Corporation (now Urban Renewal Authority). He is a director of numerous large corporates, including China Resources Cement Holdings Ltd.

== Political stance ==
Long a staunch pro-Beijing supporter of the Hong Kong Government, Shek surprised observers in October 2019 by siding with protestors in calling for an independent inquiry into police suppression of the then widespread pro-democracy protests, and in criticising the government's failure to recognise the need to address community concerns, particularly those among youth.

In March 2021, after FTU president Stanley Ng said that the government had allowed a "property hegemony" to allow developers to benefit greatly from increased property prices, Shek defended developers and said such "Cultural Revolution-style" criticism of developers would not fix the housing issues.

In April 2021, Shek opposed a bill that would introduce a vacancy tax on new units that were built but not sold after 12 months, a tax that would punish developers for leaving empty units unsold or unlet.

== Positions held ==
Chairman, Public Accounts Committee, Legislative Council of HKSAR since October 2012,
Chairman, English Schools Foundation since May 2015
Honorary Fellow of The Education University of Hong Kong
Honorary Fellow of The University of Hong Kong
Honorary Fellow of The Hong Kong University of Science and Technology
Honorary Fellow of Lingnan University (Hong Kong)

Legislative Council of Hong Kong
Preceded by Ronald Arculli	Member of Legislative Council; Representative for Real Estate and Construction; 2000–2021	Succeeded by Loong Hon-biu
Preceded by James To	Senior Member in Legislative Council; 2020–2021	Succeeded by Tommy Cheung
Order of precedence
Preceded by Leung Yiu-chung; Member of the Legislative Council	Hong Kong order of precedence Member of the Legislative Council	Succeeded by Joseph Lee; Member of the Legislative Council
