= Yiu Pak-leung =

Hong Kong politician (born 1974)

The Honourable Yiu Pak-leung MH, JP
- 姚柏良
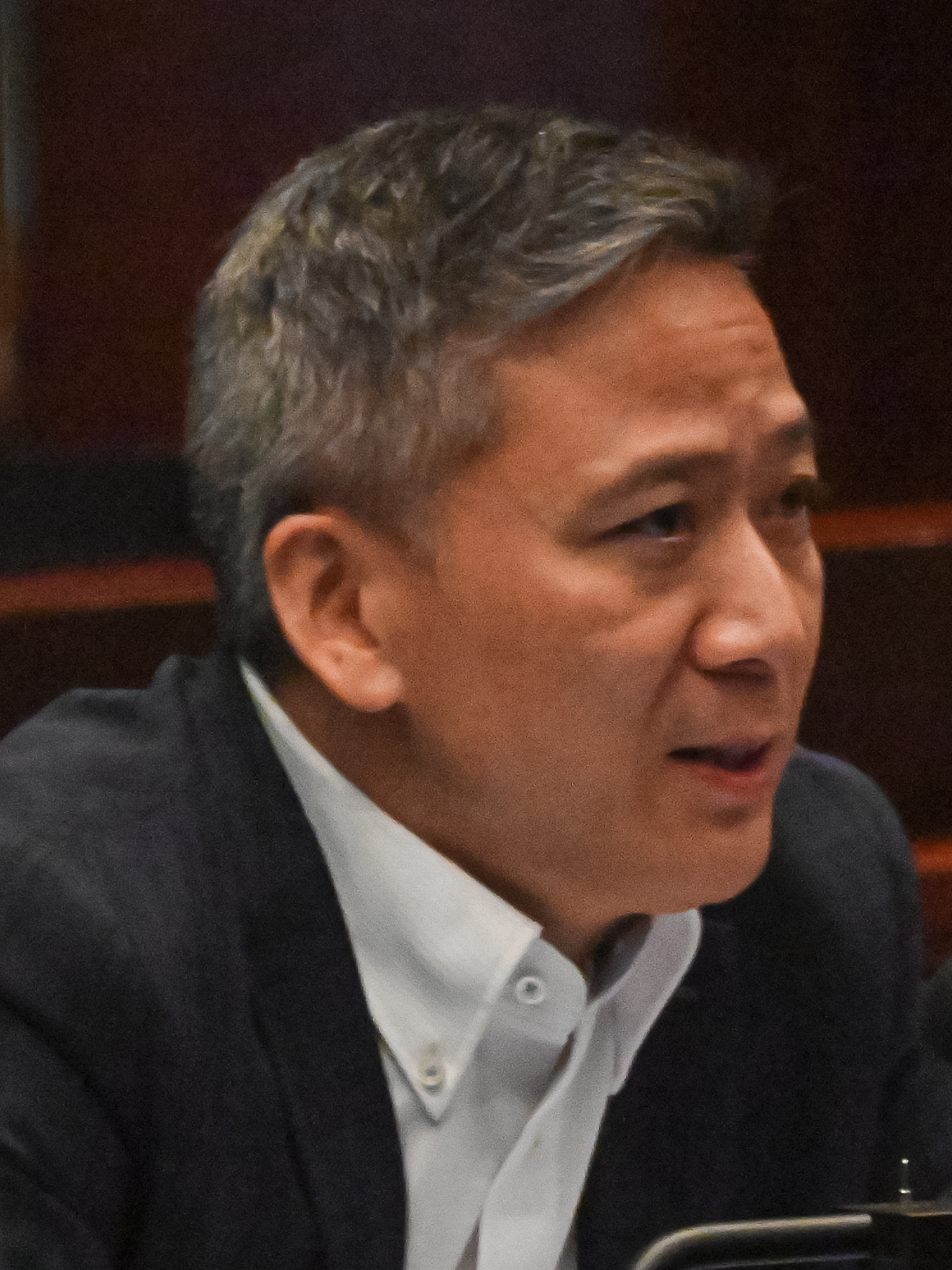
- Yiu in 2023

Member of the Legislative Council
- Incumbent
- Assumed office 1 January 2026
- Constituency: Election Committee
- In office 1 January 2022 – 31 December 2025
- Preceded by: Yiu Si-wing
- Succeeded by: Vivian Kong
- Constituency: Tourism

Member of the Kwun Tong District Council
- In office 1 January 2008 – 31 December 2019
- Preceded by: Chan Cheong
- Succeeded by: Eason Chan Yik-shun
- Constituency: Ping Tin

Personal details
- Born: 11 March 1974 (age 52)
- Party: Positive Synergy (since 2013)
- Education: Hong Kong Polytechnic University (MSc); Chinese University of Hong Kong (MEd)

Perry Yiu Pak-leung, MH, JP (Chinese: 姚柏良; born 11 March 1974) is a member of the Legislative Council of Hong Kong. He represented the Tourism constituency from 2022 to 2025, and is a current member of the election committee constituency. He is chairman of the China Travel Service (Hong Kong).

== Biography ==
Yiu was graduated from the Hong Kong Polytechnic University with a Master of Science in International Hospitality Management and obtained a Master of Education at the Chinese University of Hong Kong.

Yiu was first elected to the Kwun Tong District Council in the 2007 District Council election through Ping Tin as a New Century Forum candidate until he was defeated in the pro-democracy landslide in 2019. He was also elected to the Election Committee in 2011 through the Hong Kong and Kowloon District Council subsector.

Yiu was elected to the Legislative Council of Hong Kong through Tourism constituency in the 2021 Hong Kong legislative election with 160 votes.

Yiu was re-elected through election committee constituency with the highest votes 1,397 in 2025.

Political offices
Preceded by Chan Cheong	Member of the Kwun Tong District Council; Representative for Ping Tin; 2008–2019	Succeeded by Eason Chan
Legislative Council of Hong Kong
Preceded by Yiu Si-wing	Member of Legislative Council; Representative for Tourism; 2022–2026	Succeeded by Vivian Kong
