= CCC Chuen Yuen College =

Secondary school in the New Territories of Hong Kong

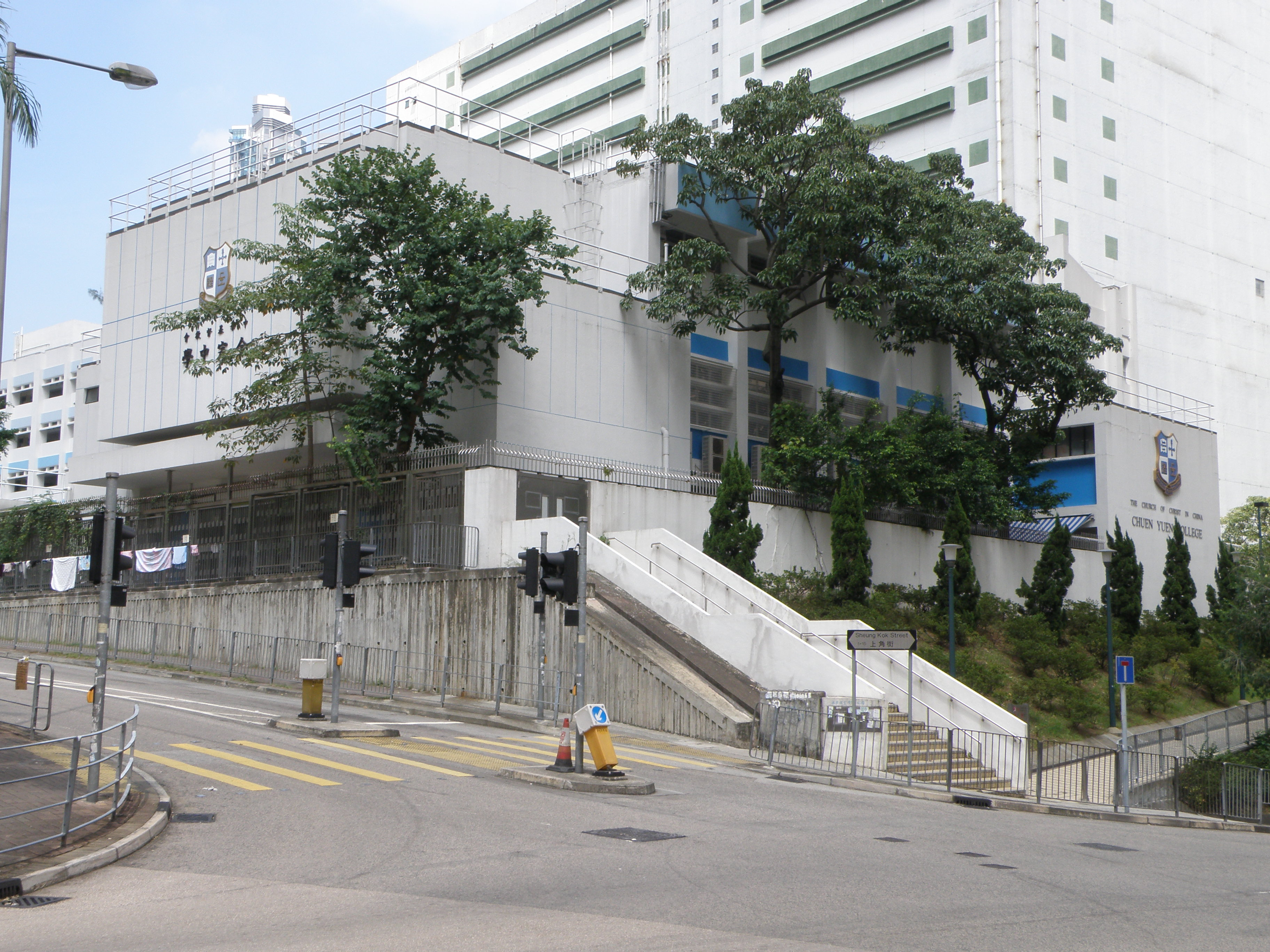

Location
- 15 Sheung Kwok Street; Kwai Chung, New Territories; Hong Kong
- 22.3685°N 114.1281°E

Information
- Type: Aided, secondary, co-educational.
- Motto: 學以明道，完似天父
- Established: 1969
- Principal: Ms. Ling See Yan
- Enrollment: 1110
- Website: chuenyuen.edu.hk

CCC Chuen Yuen College (Chinese: 中華基督教會全完中學) is a Chinese Christian secondary school in Hong Kong. Established in 1969 and located in the Kwai Chung district of the New Territories, the school consists of a 50,000-square-foot (4,600 m^{2}), six-storey school building and a new wing which was opened in 2004. Facilities of the school include of 24 conventional class rooms, eleven special purpose rooms, an assembly hall that seats a thousand people, and a basketball court.

== History ==
With the number of local school-age children increasing continuously, the late Reverend Peter Wong, former General Secretary of The Hong Kong Council of the Church of Christ in China, decided to build a new secondary school in Kwai Chung in response to rising demand for school vacancies. After much planning, an English-language secondary school was built and given the name of Chuen Yuen College, after other schools with the name of Chuen Yuen in the area.

On 18 May 1969, the cornerstone was laid in a ceremony presided over by Professor Yung Chi-tung (容啟東), president of Chung Chi College, Chinese University of Hong Kong. The first classes were held that September. On 16 November, the school held a public dedication ceremony with Bishop Otto Nall.

Initially, the school only offered the standard Chinese curriculum, but, starting in 1972, it allowed English education students to enroll. In 1973, the school added Hong Kong university preparatory classes and a math/science programme to its offerings. In 1974, it expanded to 24 different classes, offering a standard education program. Directives from Hong Kong's education administration requiring 9 years of free education for students led the school to expand its admissions in 1976, and in 1978, again in response to government directives, it began offering special education classes. However, in 1985 government funding changed and it began reducing its special education enrollments and increasing the number of ordinary classes.

The school's founding headmaster, Mr Cheung Wan Cha (張雲槎), retired in 1983. Its second headmaster, Mrs Yau Oi Naam (邱藹楠), left the school in 1992. The third headmaster, Mrs Lei Sek Yuk Ru (李石玉如), returned to serve in her alma mater, the Ying Wa Girls' School (中華基督教會英華女校), in Sept 2001; Mr. Wong Wai Yiu (黃偉耀) took over as the fourth headmaster in 2001 and retired in 2019. Mr. Ip Tin Yau (葉天祐) took over as the fifth headmaster, retiring in 2025. Ms. Ling See Yan (凌施恩) took over as the sixth (and current) headmaster.

== Programmes offered and administration structure ==
The programme offered at Chuen Yuen is roughly the same as in other Hong Kong schools. Outside of the core subjects, it offers classes in fine arts and graphic design, music, home economics, industrial arts, computer skills, physical education and religion, in conformance with public needs. In recent years, it has added to its offerings Mandarin language classes and business administration, accounting theory, travel and tourism education and communications studies, in order to give students more choices.

The school is under the direction of an administrative council along with special committees for education, instructional services, extracurricular activities, religion, guidance counselling, citizenship and moral education, each responsible for the corresponding department and for improving standards in their respective fields. Furthermore, the school has special interest committees such as the information science and technology committee, the teacher training committee, and the parents' support and liaison committee. In 1994, the school also established an association of friends, parents and teachers of Chuen Yuen college.

== Trivia ==
Guests who visit the school would sometimes mistake the name of the school for Yuen Chuen (Traditional Chinese:完全), which means utterness in Chinese.

This school is an English middle school. In 1998, in order to cooperate with the Department of Education, the mother tongue teaching policy changed to Cantonese, until the 2011-12 academic year, when it returned to English teaching again.
