= Patriots administering Hong Kong =

Chinese Communist Party slogan

"Patriots administering Hong Kong" (simplified Chinese: 爱国者治港; traditional Chinese: 愛國者治港) (Note: Translation varies, including "Patriots governing Hong Kong" and "Patriots ruling Hong Kong") is the principle proposed by the Chinese Communist Party (CCP) that allows only those deemed to be "patriots" to the party and to the Chinese government to rule Hong Kong. Heavily emphasized after massive protests in 2019 and the introduction of the national security law in 2020, this principle effectively bars anyone the Chinese government sees as a dissident or critic, including the pro-democracy members, to run for public offices.

== Origin ==
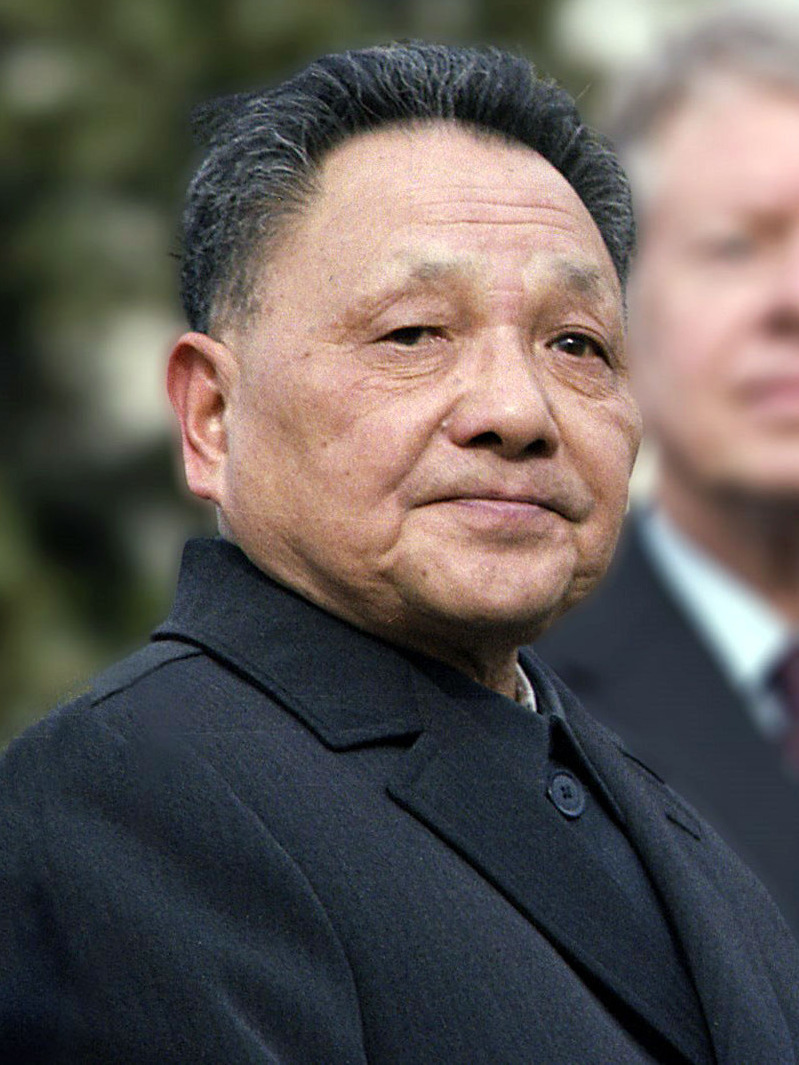
Deng in 1979

The principle was first proposed by Deng Xiaoping, then Chairman of the CCP Central Advisory Commission, in 1984. He said the promise of Hong Kong people administering Hong Kong (Chinese: 港人治港) has its scope, that patriots should form the mainstay. Deng also defined a patriot as to respect one's own nation, to "sincerely support" China to resume exercising sovereignty over Hong Kong, and not to harm the city's prosperity and stability.

== Evolution ==
The National People's Congress of China adopted the Hong Kong national security law in 2020 in response to the widespread demonstration against the Hong Kong government a year before. In January 2021, when Chief Executive Carrie Lam made her annual duty report to General Secretary of the Chinese Communist Party Xi Jinping, Xi affirmed that Hong Kong must be ruled by patriots as the only way to maintain Beijing's sovereignty over the city and safeguard the constitutional order of "one country, two systems".

To ensure the stability and sustainability of one country, two systems, we must always adhere to "patriots administering Hong Kong". This is a fundamental principle that concerns national sovereignty, security… and the long-term prosperity and stability of Hong Kong.

— Xi Jinping (translation from Mandarin)

Tam Yiu-chung, a heavyweight from the pro-Beijing camp, believed more measures could be implemented by Lam's government to implement the principle. Pro-democratic ex-lawmaker Fernando Cheung argued Xi's comments marked the end of the rule of law with totalitarianism, considering that the threshold can be shifted anytime according to the communists' pleasure.

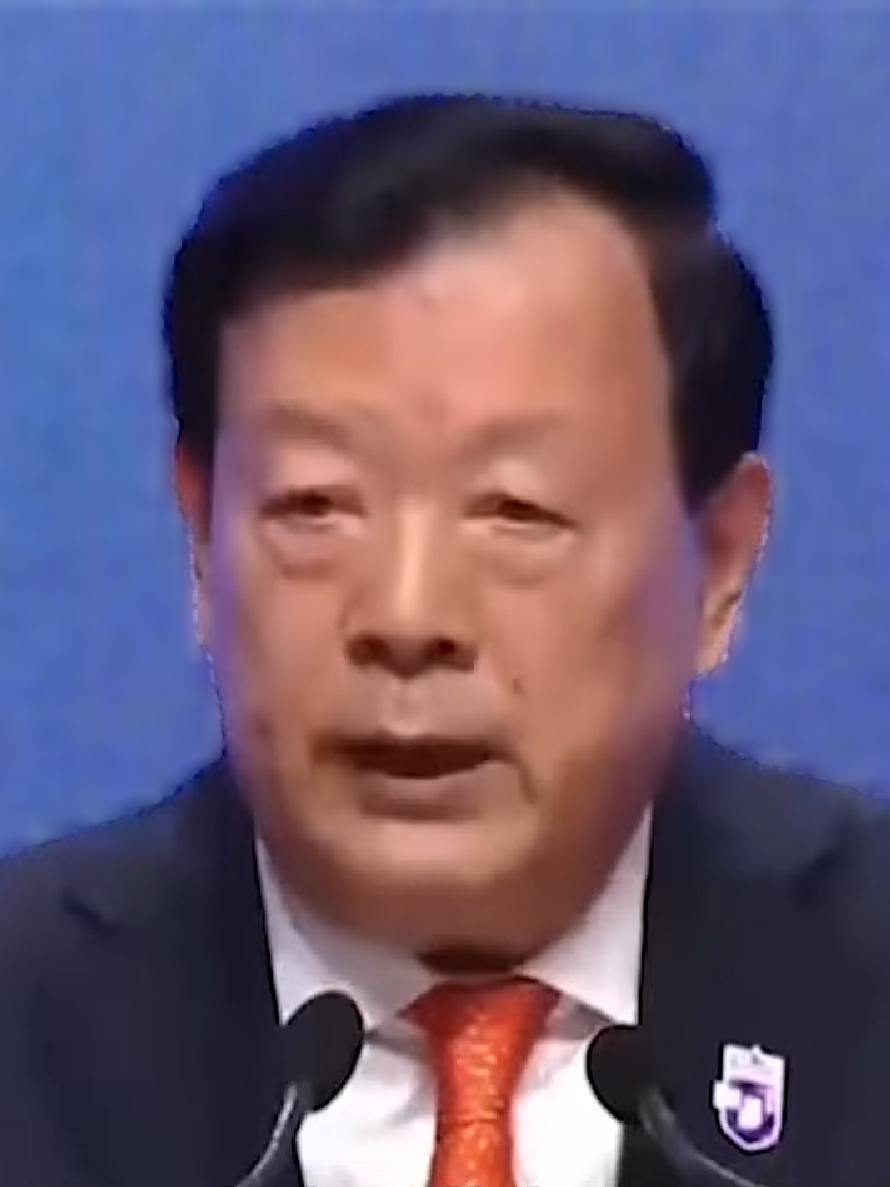
Xia in 2023

Xia Baolong, head of China's Hong Kong and Macau Affairs Office, said a month later that the lowest threshold for patriots is not to engage in acts that endanger the national sovereignty and security, and thus those smearing the central government, publicly advocating independence of Hong Kong, and begging for foreign sanctions are "undoubtedly" not patriots. He outlined the three criteria of "patriots".

1. Genuinely uphold Chinese sovereignty, security, and benefits of development
2. Respect and protect the fundamental system of the state and the constitutional order of the Special Administrative Region
3. Fully safeguard the prosperity and stability of Hong Kong

In the same speech, Xia also hinted at an unprecedented overhaul of the administrative and electoral systems such as the Election Committee, which is responsible for electing the Chief Executive, Legislative Council, and District Councils, which he claimed was infiltrated by the opposition who sought to cause chaos. Xia instructed that only "patriots" could hold public offices in the executive, legislature, and judiciary system, and in statutory bodies, leaving no place in for "anti-China elements".

Key posts under every circumstances must not be taken up by anyone "who goes against China and disrupts Hong Kong". Those who stand in opposition to patriots are destroyers of the "one country, two systems" principle and they should not be allowed to take a share of the Hong Kong special administrative region's political power. Not now, not ever.

— Xia Baolong (translation from Mandarin)

Opposition accused China of attempting to further stack the elections with loyalists and using the definition of patriots to suit its own agenda.

== Electoral changes ==
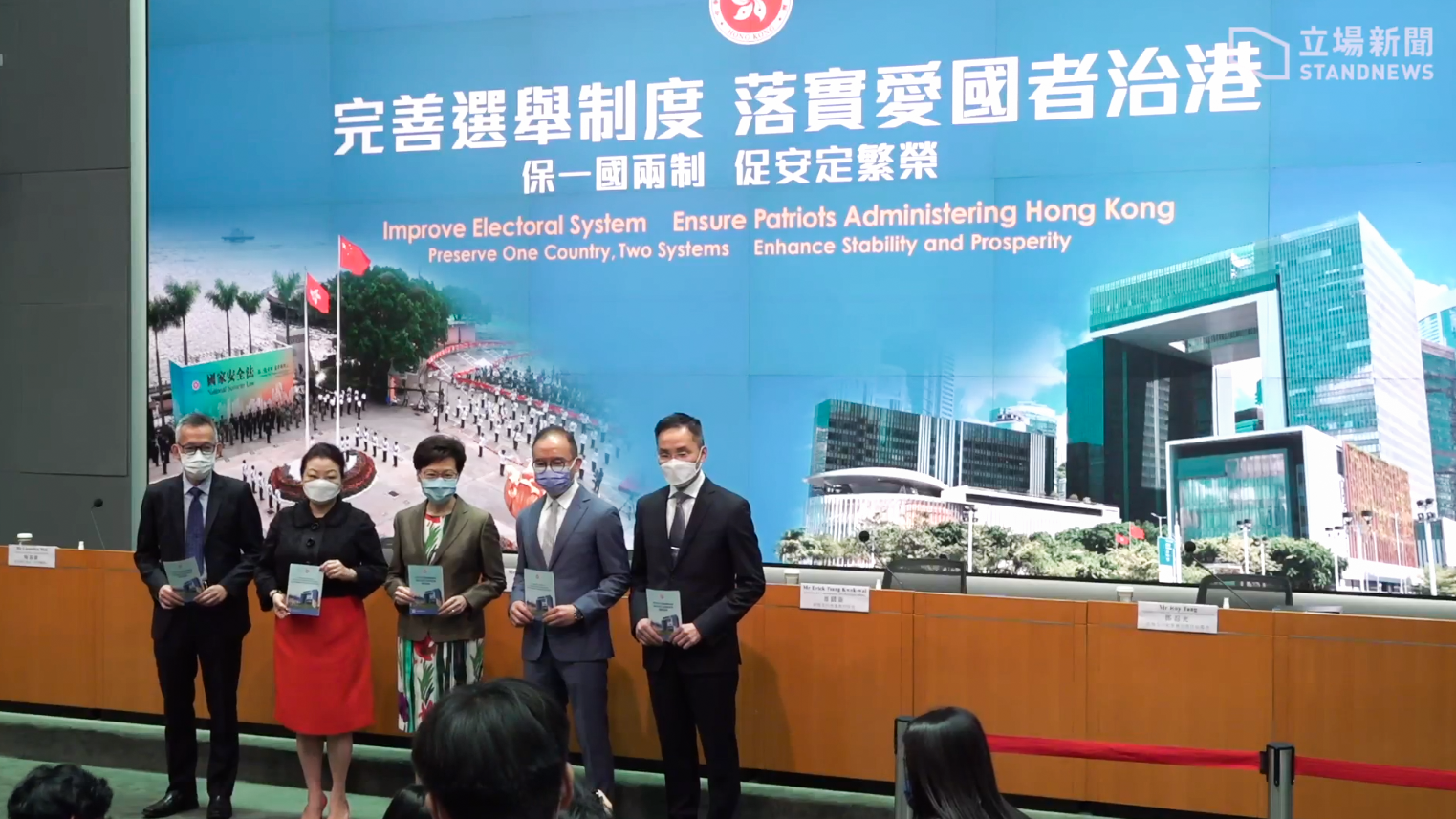
Hong Kong Government announced electoral reform in April 2021 to "ensure patriots administering Hong Kong"

The revision to the electoral system was led by China and was declared by the authorities an "improvement". In March, the National People's Congress Standing Committee amended the Annexes of the Basic Law of Hong Kong to drastically revamp the compositions of the Election Committee and the Legislative Council. The Election Committee was expanded with a sizeable number of new seats nominated and elected by the government-appointed and Beijing-controlled organizations. The enlarged Legislative Council would be dominated by pro-Beijing forces as the directly elected seats would be shrunk to one-third only. A new vetting mechanism would also be created to vet every candidate running for the Chief Executive, the Legislative Council and the Election Committee based on the approval of the Hong Kong Committee for Safeguarding National Security. The reforms have been widely criticized for their negative impact on the democratic representation in the Hong Kong legislature.

Two years later, the Hong Kong government enacted local legislation to change the District Councils, with the number of elected seats significantly reduced to around 20 per cent. Pro-democracy camp, already dealt with a heavy blow after dissolution of several political parties and arrests of activists and prominent leaders, was unable to participate in any of the "patriots-only" elections as candidates require nominations from pro-government members.

The new elections were seen to have very little democratic participation left and was denounced by exiled opposition as a sham. The 2019 local elections, won overwhelmingly by the pro-democracy camp, were considered to be the last free and fair election.
