= Registration of Same-sex Partnerships Bill =

Proposed legislation of Hong Kong

Legislative Council of Hong Kong
- Long title: A Bill to establish a regime for the registration of same-sex partnerships and provide for related matters; and to make related amendments to certain enactments.
- Territorial extent: Hong Kong

Legislative history
- Bill title: Registration of Same-sex Partnerships Bill
- Introduced by: Erick Tsang, Secretary for Constitutional and Mainland Affairs
- Introduced: 16 July 2025
- Committee responsible: Bills Committee on Registration of Same-sex Partnerships Bill
- First reading: 16 July 2025
- Voting summary: 14 voted for; 71 voted against; 1 abstained; 2 absent; 1 present not voting

Related cases
- Sham Tsz Kit v Secretary for Justice
- Status: Not passed

The Registration of Same-sex Partnerships Bill (Chinese: 同性伴侶關係登記條例草案) was a bill introduced by the Government of Hong Kong in the Legislative Council of Hong Kong that proposed to create a framework for granting limited legal rights to same-sex partnerships entered into overseas. The bill was part of the government's response to the Court of Final Appeal's decision in Sham Tsz Kit v Secretary for Justice that a substitute legal framework for same-sex partnerships must be introduced, and did not propose to recognise same-sex marriage.

Despite the existence of a pro-government supermajority in the legislature, the bill was staunchly opposed by the conservative majority of the bloc and was overwhelmingly rejected at the second reading. It became the first government bill to be voted down since the national security reform of the legislature in 2021.

== Background ==
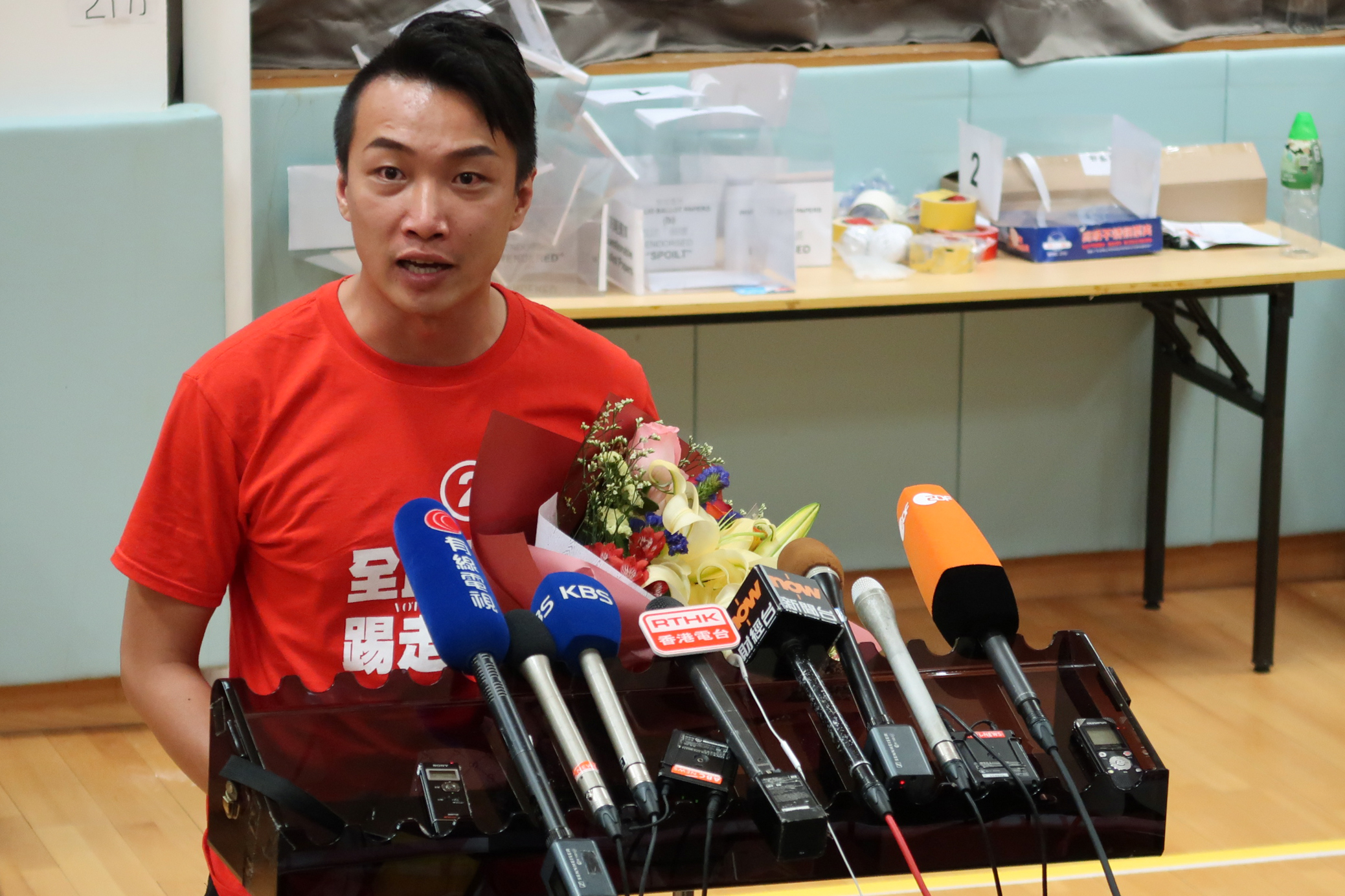
Jimmy Sham

Hong Kong does not recognise same-sex marriage or civil unions. While a string of court decisions have slowly afforded same-sex couples a small number of legal rights, the courts have also consistently held that same-sex couples have no constitutional right to marry under the Basic Law, and had previously refused to recognise same-sex partnerships through the creation of an alternative legal framework. However, in response to a judicial challenge filed by LGBT rights activist Jimmy Sham Tsz-kit, Hong Kong's highest court, the Court of Final Appeal, held in 2023 in Sham Tsz Kit v Secretary for Justice that the government's failure to provide an alternative legal framework for recognising same-sex partnerships was a violation of Article 14 of the Hong Kong Bill of Rights Ordinance, which provides for the protection of privacy. The court ordered the government to create such a framework, with the order suspended for two years to allow for implementation.

== Content and procedural history ==
The Court of Final Appeal's ruling in the Sham Tsz Kit case gave the government two years to legislate a legal framework to recognise same-sex relationships. At a meeting of the Legislative Council's panel on constitutional affairs on 3 July 2025, the government unveiled a legislative proposal to enable same-sex partnerships formed overseas to be recognised in a limited fashion. Under the legislation, such couples would be afforded rights concerning medical decisions, including rights for hospital visits, shared medical information, organ donation and dealing with a person's remains. To be eligible, couples must have a valid overseas marriage or civil partnership or union, and at least one person must be a Hong Kong resident.

The Government gazetted the Registration of Same-sex Partnerships Bill on 11 July 2025. The bill was introduced in the Legislative Council for its first reading by Erick Tsang, the Secretary for Constitutional and Mainland Affairs, on 16 July 2025. The second reading debate began and was customarily adjourned on the same day, pending consideration of the bill by the House Committee.

At its meeting on 18 July 2025, the House Committee resolved to form a Bills Committee to study the bill. The Bills Committee met for the first time on 23 July 2025, and made its report on 27 August 2025 after meeting four times in July. The second reading debate on the bill resumed on 10 September and ended on the same day when a majority of lawmakers voted against the motion that the bill be read for a second time, effectively rejecting the bill.

=== Bills Committee membership ===
A number of key opponents of the bill, including Holden Chow, were selected to become members of the committee, with Regina Ip being the sole supporter of the bill to join the 15-member committee. Junius Ho, who was one of the bill's strongest critics at the constitutional affairs panel meeting in early July, was among 36 legislators to express an intention to join the committee, but failed to be chosen as one of the committee's 15 members. The membership of the Bills Committee was said to be allocated in proportion to the partisan makeup of the legislature, with larger parties given more seats on the committee. The exclusion of Ho was said to be predetermined in order not to stir up more controversies and polarisations in the society. At its first meeting on 23 July 2025, nine of the committee's members spoke in opposition to the bill and two leaned towards opposing it, (Note: They include members of DAB (Chan Yung (also committee chair), Holden Chow, Vincent Cheng, Nixie Lam, Edmund Wong), of BPA (Lo Wai-kwok, Jimmy Ng), of FTU (Kingsley Wong), of Liberal (Shiu Ka-fai), and of FEW (Tang Fei). Two independents (Kenneth Leung, So Cheung-wing) tend to oppose, while two others did not express their stance (Hoey Simon Lee, Yim Kong)) with Regina Ip being the only member to voice support.

=== Lobbying ===
Amid vehement criticisms from legislators, Erick Tsang, the minister responsible for the bill, briefed members twice on the bill to understand their position. On 31 July, FTU President Ng Chau-pei posted on social media claiming Tsang threatened him to support the bill or "face consequences"; Ng apologised for his "overstated" comments on the next day. It was reported that the lobbying by the minister was in fact calm and moderate, without pressuring lawmakers to vote in favour.

== Response and criticism ==
In the absence of the liberal pro-democratic opposition, all of Hong Kong's major political parties, including the DAB and FTU, came out in opposition to the bill. The plan was presented to the opposition-free Legislative Council's Panel on Constitutional Affairs on 3 July 2025, where it was criticised by conservative pro-Beijing lawmakers for allegedly upending traditional family values and as an attack on the institution of marriage, with some accusing the government of lacking consultation. Junius Ho even called for intervention from Beijing to overturn the court decision. Some smaller parties and independent politicians have voiced support, including Regina Ip of the New People's Party, and legislator Paul Tse, who, despite being personally against same-sex marriage, called the government proposal a "conservative half-step" and urged other lawmakers to respect the court's ruling.

In response, the government stated that it firmly upholds the monogamous and heterosexual marriage system, but stressed that passage of the legislation was necessary to comply with the court's ruling. Chief Executive John Lee announced his support for the bill on 15 July, on the grounds that violating the court's order would bring "serious consequences", with adverse effects on the rule of law.

The government's plan has also been met with criticism from LGBTQ activists, who have questioned if it complies with the court's ruling, although Jimmy Sham, the litigant in the court case that led to the bill's introduction, eventually gave the bill his support. The extra-parliamentary Democratic Party and pro-democracy Hong Kong Social Workers' General Union backed the proposal, affirming the need to protect sexual minorities and defend the rule of law.

A number of religious groups, including the Chinese Muslim Cultural and Fraternal Association, The Boys' Brigade, Hong Kong, The Hong Kong Chinese Christian Council and the Sisters of the Precious Blood, have spoken in opposition to the legislation, while other religious groups, such as the Sheng Kung Hui, the Hong Kong Taoist Association, the Hong Kong Baptist Convention, the Catholic Diocese of Hong Kong, and the Hong Kong Evangelical Church, have yet to respond. It was reported that the Sheng Kung Hui and the Catholic Diocese considered this topic to be controversial and could polarise the faithful, and therefore remained silent. The diocese's sexual plurality task force eventually stood against the bill.

The secretariat of the Legislative Council received over 10,000 submissions from the public with regard to the bill, the most since the 2021 electoral changes. Amongst the 6,557 published letters, over 70% were in opposition to the legislation.

The Law Society of Hong Kong believe that the Registration of Same-sex Partnerships Bill might pass in October 2025.

== Voting result ==
Second reading
Ballot →	10 September 2025
Required majority →	44 out of 87 present
Yes: • NPP (6); • BPA (2); • DAB (1); • Lib (1); • Independent (4)	14 / 87
No: • DAB (17); • FTU (6); • BPA (5); • Lib (3); • FLU (2); • FEW (2); • Other / Independent (36)	71 / 87
Abstain: • Independent (1)	1 / 87
Present not voting: • BPA (1, President)	1 / 87
Not present: • DAB (1); • FTU (1)	2

Throughout the debate of the bill, only the NPP has explicitly ordered its members to vote in favour to "support rule of law". A vote count by the media just after the first reading found that more than 40 legislators across multiple parties stated that they intended or were inclined to vote against the bill. At least 12 would cast a yes vote, including 5 members of the Executive Council who are bound to support the government under collective ministerial responsibility.

Chinese officials had reportedly reached out to several legislators for their stance but did not whip votes or issue any instructions and the second reading vote is expected to be a "free vote", although it was later emerged that while Beijing does not oppose protecting the rights of same-sex partners in principle, the issue could publicly split the pro-government bloc. As the legislature moved closer to the voting, media sources said at least one legislator was forced to vote no despite his personal support; another was "reminded to protect oneself" and decided to abstain instead of voting yes. It was also reported that MPs were secretly lobbied by some notable members of the public or politicians not to support the bill, including a CPPCC member Samuel Yung Wing-ki.

The bill was resoundingly defeated on 10 September with 71 against and only 14 voting in favour. Doreen Kong, who voiced support at the early stage, became the only member to vote abstain, arguing that a bill should not move forward or rejected before a consensus is reached in the society. Reverend Peter Douglas Koon, who originally planned to abstain after considering varying stance amongst social workers, eventually switched side and voted against the bill due to divergent stance in religious sector. Leung Man-kwong also voted no despite earlier reports suggesting he may abstain. Dominic Lee, a former spokesman of an anti-same-sex marriage group, was suggested to be seeking not to follow party's whip; he ultimately cast a yes vote along with his party colleagues. Two legislators were not inside the chamber at the time of voting, including Starry Lee who was heading to Beijing to attend NPCSC meeting. A critic of the bill before its first reading, Ng Chau-pei did not speak during the second reading and left the chamber before it was put to a vote in order to "attend to personal urgent matters".

Second reading of Registration of Same-sex Partnerships Bill
Group	Constituency	Members	Party	Vote	Note
FC	Industrial (First)	Andrew Leung	BPA	Present	The council president abstains from voting to preserve neutrality by convention.
FC	Catering	Tommy Cheung	Liberal	Yes	Executive Council member (Note: Under collective ministerial responsibility, members of Executive Council should support government bills) (Note: The party which he/she is a member of opposed the bill)
FC	Commercial (First)	Jeffrey Lam	BPA	Yes	Executive Council member
ECC	Election Committee	Starry Lee	DAB	—	Not present
GC	New Territories North East	Chan Hak-kan	DAB/NTAS	Yes	Executive Council member
FC	Insurance	Chan Kin-por	Independent	Yes	Executive Council member
ECC	Election Committee	Priscilla Leung	BPA/KWND	No	
GC	Hong Kong Island West	Regina Ip	NPP	Yes	Executive Council convenor; Bills Committee member
ECC	Election Committee	Paul Tse	Independent	Yes	
GC	New Territories North West	Michael Tien	Roundtable	No	
FC	Agriculture and Fisheries	Steven Ho	DAB	No	
FC	Transport	Frankie Yick	Liberal	No	
ECC	Election Committee	Ma Fung-kwok	New Forum	No	
GC	New Territories South West	Chan Han-pan	DAB/NTAS	No	
GC	Labour	Kwok Wai-keung	FTU	No	
ECC	Election Committee	Elizabeth Quat	DAB	No	
FC	Commercial (Second)	Martin Liao	Independent	Yes	Executive Council member
FC	Engineering	Lo Wai-kwok	BPA	No	Bills Committee member
FC	Industrial (Second)	Jimmy Ng	BPA	No	Bills Committee member
ECC	Election Committee	Junius Ho	Independent	No	
GC	New Territories North West	Holden Chow	DAB	No	Bills Committee member
FC	Wholesale and Retail	Shiu Ka-fai	Liberal	No	Bills Committee member
ECC	Election Committee	Yung Hoi-yan	NPP/CF	Yes	
FC	Finance	Chan Chun-ying	Independent	No	
ECC	Election Committee	Luk Chung-hung	FTU	No	
GC	New Territories North	Lau Kwok-fan	DAB	No	
FC	Heung Yee Kuk	Kenneth Lau	BPA	Yes	Executive Council member
GC	Kowloon West	Vincent Cheng	DAB	No	Bills Committee member
FC	Architectural, Surveying, Planning and Landscape	Tony Tse	Independent	Yes	
ECC	Election Committee	Doreen Kong	Independent	Abstain	
FC	Education	Chu Kwok-keung	FEW	No	
GC	New Territories South East	Stanley Li	DAB/NTAS	No	
ECC	Election Committee	Hoey Simon Lee	Independent	No	Bills Committee member
FC	Financial Services	Robert Lee	Independent	No	
GC	New Territories North East	Dominic Lee	NPP/CF	Yes	
FC	Social Welfare	Tik Chi-yuen	Third Side	No	
ECC	Election Committee	Lee Chun-keung	Liberal	No	
GC	Hong Kong Island East	Stanley Ng	FTU	—	Executive Council member; Not present
ECC	Election Committee	Johnny Ng	Independent	No	
FC	Labour	Chau Siu-chung	FLU	No	
ECC	Election Committee	Chow Man-kong	Independent	No	
FC	Medical and Health Services	David Lam	Independent	No	
ECC	Election Committee	Lam Chun-sing	FLU	No	
GC	New Territories South East	Lam So-wai	PP	No	
ECC	Election Committee	Nixie Lam	DAB	No	
ECC	Election Committee	Dennis Lam	Independent	No	
FC	Legal	Lam San-keung	Independent	No	
ECC	Election Committee	Andrew Lam	Independent	No	
FC	Technology and Innovation	Duncan Chiu	Independent	No	
FC	Tourism	Yiu Pak-leung	Independent	No	
ECC	Election Committee	Wendy Hong	Independent	No	
FC	Labour	Dennis Leung	FTU	No	
GC	Kowloon West	Leung Man-kwong	KWND	No	
GC	Hong Kong Island East	Edward Leung	DAB	No	
ECC	Election Committee	Kenneth Leung	Independent	No	Bills Committee member
ECC	Election Committee	Chan Yuet-ming	Independent	No	
ECC	Election Committee	Rock Chen	DAB	No	
ECC	Election Committee	Chan Pui-leung	Independent	No	
FC	HKSAR members of NPC and CPPCC, Representatives of National Organisations	Chan Yung	DAB/NTAS	No	Bills Committee chair
FC	Textiles and Garment	Sunny Tan	BPA	No	
ECC	Election Committee	Judy Chan	NPP	Yes	
ECC	Election Committee	Maggie Chan	Independent	No	
ECC	Election Committee	Chan Siu-hung	Independent	No	
ECC	Election Committee	Chan Hoi-yan	Independent	No	
GC	New Territories South West	Joephy Chan	FTU	No	
GC	Hong Kong Island West	Chan Hok-fung	DAB	No	
GC	New Territories North	Gary Zhang	New Prospect	No	
ECC	Election Committee	Lilian Kwok	DAB	No	
ECC	Election Committee	Benson Luk	BPA	No	
FC	Import and Export	Kennedy Wong	DAB	No	
FC	Accountancy	Edmund Wong	DAB	No	Bills Committee member
ECC	Election Committee	Kingsley Wong	FTU	No	Bills Committee member
GC	Kowloon Central	Yang Wing-kit	Independent	No	
ECC	Election Committee	Peter Koon	Independent	No	
ECC	Election Committee	Tang Fei	FEW	No	Bills Committee member
GC	Kowloon East	Tang Ka-piu	FTU	No	
ECC	Election Committee	Lai Tung-kwok	NPP	Yes	
ECC	Election Committee	Lau Chi-pang	Independent	No	
FC	Sports, Performing Arts, Culture and Publication	Kenneth Fok	Independent	No	
FC	Real Estate and Construction	Louis Loong	Independent	No	
GC	Kowloon East	Ngan Man-yu	DAB	No	
ECC	Election Committee	Carmen Kan	Independent	No	
ECC	Election Committee	Tan Yueheng	Independent	No	
ECC	Election Committee	So Cheung-wing	Independent	No	Bills Committee member
FC	Commercial (Third)	Yim Kong	Independent	No	Bills Committee member
ECC	Election Committee	Adrian Ho	NPP	Yes	
ECC	Election Committee	Shang Hailong	Independent	No	
ECC	Election Committee	Chan Wing-kwong	DAB	No	
ECC	Election Committee	William Wong	Independent	No	

== Analysis and aftermath ==
Registration of Same-sex Partnerships Bill became the first government bill to be voted down since the 2015 political reform proposal was rejected, although the result was widely expected and described as "the writing on the wall". Constitutional affairs secretary Erick Tsang told reporters that while the government was disappointed by the result, it would respect the view of the legislature, as they consider legislators elected to represent public opinion, adding that despite the bill's rejection, Hong Kong remains a "highly diverse" and "inclusive" society, and that there are "many safeguards" in place to protect the rights of same sex couples. Tsang indicated that it was the government's view that it had made every effort to secure the implementation of an alternative framework as required by the court ruling, and that the government would not seek an extension to the order's suspension period. The government is considering administrative measures to carry out the court's judgement.

A pro-Beijing member said the bill is part of the East and West confrontation on moral values, and a matter of political division between the government camp and the rump opposition, as it is ignited by a lawsuit from former pro-democracy leader Jimmy Sham. In response to the voting result, Sham said he was disappointed but was confident that the government would continue to fulfill the obligation.

Among the religious sector, Archbishop Andrew Chan stated that though the bill was vetoed, but it doesn't mean that the society neglects homosexuals. Canon Peter Koon stated that the veto doesn't draw pullbacks to attract the talents to Hong Kong.

Right after the veto of the bill, the Hong Kong and Macao Office in Beijing published a statement commented that the independent judgement of the courts are not intervened and the LegCo is not a "rubber stamp". The statement also warned some "wolves under a sheep's clothing" may politicise the disputes causing instability.

== See also ==
- LGBTQ rights in Hong Kong
- Marriage (Amendment) Bill 2014
