= Tan Yueheng =

Hong Kong politician

- 譚岳衡
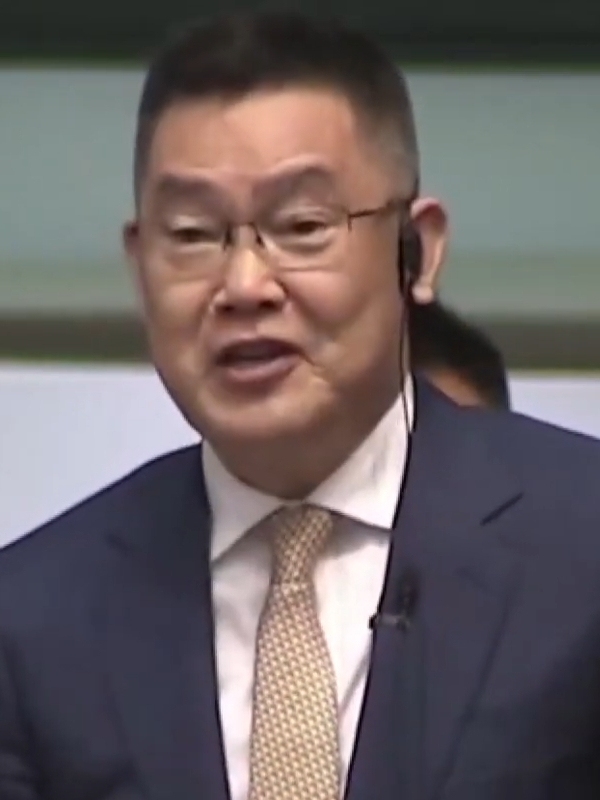
- Tan at the Legislative Council of Hong Kong in 2023

Member of the Legislative Council
- In office 1 January 2022 – 31 December 2025
- Constituency: Election Committee

Personal details
- Born: November 1962 (age 63) Hengyang, Hunan, China
- Citizenship: Hong Kong
- Education: Hunan University; Chinese Academy of Social Sciences

Tan Yueheng (simplified Chinese: 谭岳衡; traditional Chinese: 譚岳衡) is a Hong Kong politician who was one of the Legislative Council members for the Election Committee constituency between 2022 and 2025. He is said to be the "first communist in Hong Kong parliament" after information from Chinese companies showed that he is a member of the Chinese Communist Party.

Tan was elected in 2021 election with 1,245 votes. He was soon discovered to be a member of the CCP according to information from websites of Chinese companies. Tan had declined to comment on this issue. Tan was also one of three people, out of 90 legislative council members, who took his oath using Mandarin rather than Hong Kong Cantonese.

In addition to public office, he is the chairman and executive director of the BOCOM International Holdings Company Limited.

On 5 January 2022, Carrie Lam announced new warnings and restrictions against social gathering due to potential COVID-19 outbreaks. One day later, it was discovered that Tan attended a birthday party hosted by Witman Hung, with 222 guests. At least one guest tested positive with COVID-19, causing all guests to be quarantined.

Tan chose not to seek re-election in October 2025.

== Electoral history ==
2021 Legislative Council election: Election Committee
| Party | Candidate | Votes | % | ±% |
|---|---|---|---|---|
| BPA (KWND) | Leung Mei-fun | 1,348 | 94.93 | |
| DAB | Cheung Kwok-kwan | 1,342 | 94.51 | |
| FEW | Tang Fei | 1,339 | 94.30 | |
| Nonpartisan | Maggie Chan Man-ki | 1,331 | 93.73 | |
| FTU | Alice Mak Mei-kuen | 1,326 | 93.38 | |
| DAB | Elizabeth Quat | 1,322 | 93.10 | |
| NPP (Civil Force) | Yung Hoi-yan | 1,313 | 92.46 | |
| Nonpartisan | Hoey Simon Lee | 1,308 | 92.11 | |
| Nonpartisan | Stephen Wong Yuen-shan | 1,305 | 91.90 | |
| DAB | Rock Chen Chung-nin | 1,297 | 91.34 | |
| Nonpartisan | Chan Hoi-yan | 1,292 | 90.99 | |
| Nonpartisan | Carmen Kan Wai-mun | 1,291 | 90.92 | |
| NPP | Judy Kapui Chan | 1,284 | 90.42 | |
| Independent | Paul Tse Wai-chun | 1,283 | 90.35 | |
| Nonpartisan | Junius Ho Kwan-yiu | 1,263 | 88.94 | |
| Nonpartisan | Tan Yueheng | 1,245 | 87.68 | |
| Nonpartisan | Chan Siu-hung | 1,239 | 87.25 | |
| Nonpartisan | Ng Kit-chong | 1,239 | 87.25 | |
| NPP | Lai Tung-kwok | 1,237 | 87.11 | |
| New Forum | Ma Fung-kwok | 1,234 | 86.90 | |
| Nonpartisan | Lau Chi-pang | 1,214 | 85.49 | |
| Nonpartisan | Chan Pui-leung | 1,205 | 84.86 | |
| FTU | Kingsley Wong Kwok | 1,192 | 83.94 | |
| Nonpartisan | Chan Yuet-ming | 1,187 | 83.59 | |
| DAB | Nixie Lam Lam | 1,181 | 83.17 | |
| FTU | Luk Chung-hung | 1,178 | 82.96 | |
| Nonpartisan | Kenneth Leung Yuk-wai | 1,160 | 81.69 | |
| Nonpartisan | Dennis Lam Shun-chiu | 1,157 | 81.48 | |
| Nonpartisan | Wendy Hong Wen | 1,142 | 80.42 | |
| Nonpartisan | Sun Dong | 1,124 | 79.15 | |
| DAB | Lillian Kwok Ling-lai | 1,122 | 79.01 | |
| Nonpartisan | Peter Douglas Koon Ho-ming | 1,102 | 77.61 | |
| Nonpartisan | Chow Man-kong | 1,060 | 74.65 | |
| Liberal | Lee Chun-keung | 1,060 | 74.65 | |
| BPA | Benson Luk Hoi-man | 1,059 | 74.58 | |
| Nonpartisan | Doreen Kong Yuk-foon | 1,032 | 72.68 | |
| Nonpartisan | Andrew Lam Siu-lo | 1,026 | 72.25 | |
| Nonpartisan | So Cheung-wing | 1,013 | 71.34 | |
| FLU | Lam Chun-sing | 1,002 | 70.56 | |
| Nonpartisan | Nelson Lam Chi-yuen | 970 | 68.31 | |
| Nonpartisan | Charles Ng Wang-wai | 958 | 67.46 | |
| Nonpartisan | Wong Chi-him | 956 | 67.32 | |
| Nonpartisan | Allan Zeman | 955 | 67.25 | |
| DAB | Chan Hoi-wing | 941 | 66.27 | |
| Nonpartisan | Tseng Chin-i | 919 | 64.72 | |
| Independent | Kevin Sun Wei-yung | 891 | 62.75 | |
| Nonpartisan | Tu Hai-ming | 834 | 58.73 | |
| FTU | Choy Wing-keung | 818 | 57.61 | |
| Nonpartisan | Fung Wai-kwong | 708 | 49.86 | |
| Nonpartisan | Michael John Treloar Rowse | 454 | 31.97 | |
| Nonpartisan | Diu Sing-hung | 342 | 24.08 | |
| Total valid votes | | 1,420 | 100.00 | |
| Rejected ballots | | 6 | | |
| Turnout | | 1,426 | 98.48 | |
| Registered electors | | 1,448 | | |
