= Doreen Kong =

Hong Kong solicitor and politician (born 1970)

The Honourable Doreen Kong
- 江玉歡
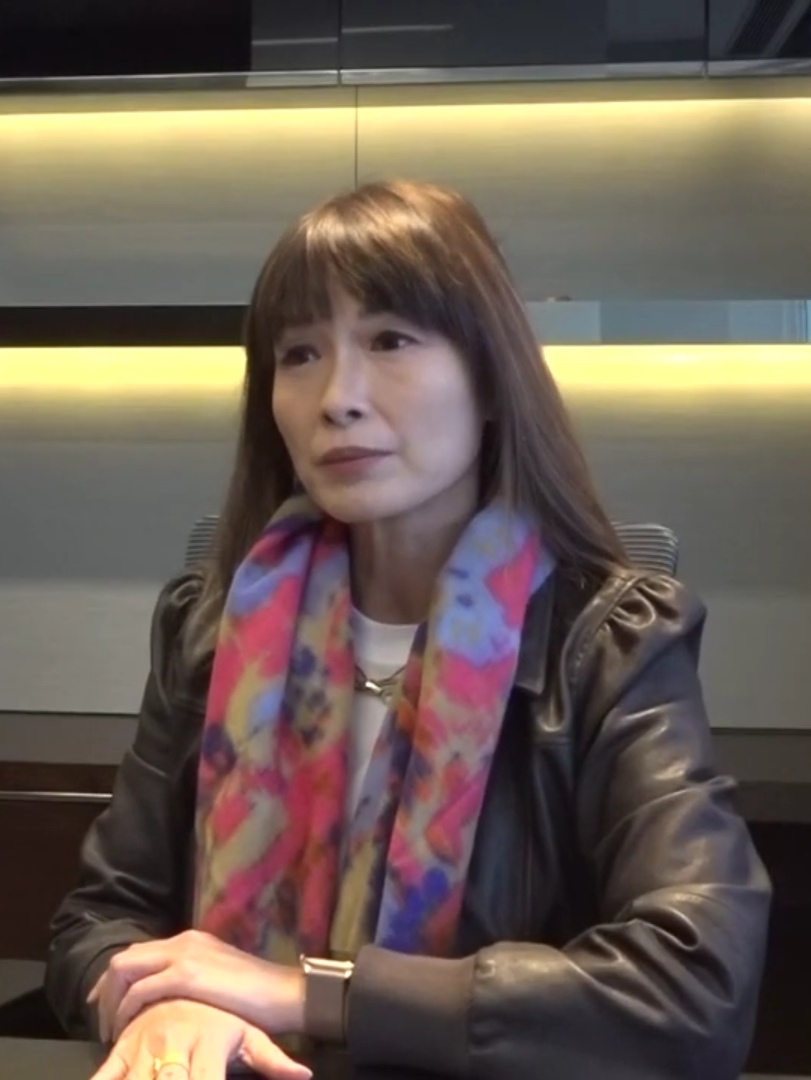

Member of the Legislative Council
- In office 1 January 2022 – 1 January 2026
- Preceded by: Constituency created
- Constituency: Election Committee

Personal details
- Born: July 12, 1970 (age 56) British Hong Kong
- Citizenship: China
- Party: New People's Party (2014–2016; 2025-present)
- Education: University of Hong Kong (LL.B., PCLL, MSc, MPA)
- Occupation: Solicitor

Doreen Kong Yuk-foon
- Traditional Chinese: 江玉歡
- Simplified Chinese: 江玉欢
Transcriptions
Standard Mandarin
- Hanyu Pinyin: Jiāng Yùhuān
Yue: Cantonese
- Jyutping: gong1 juk6 fun1

Doreen Kong Yuk-foon (born 12 July 1970) is a Hong Kong solicitor and politician. She was a member of Legislative Council for the Election Committee constituency as an independent member of the pro-Beijing camp.

== Early years ==
Kong, an orphan, was adopted after birth. She managed to study law in the University of Hong Kong despite her poor family background. After graduated with LL.B. in 1992 and PCLL in 1994, she became a solicitor in 1996, focusing on housing issues.

== Political career ==
During the Umbrella Movement in 2014, Kong organised a silent assembly. Calling the protestors "trampling" rule-of-law", she urged them to obey injunctions by the court and end the occupation. Kong joined the pro-Beijing New People's Party in the same year. She ran in the 2015 local elections, as the party's candidate in Kornhill Garden constituency, but was defeated by the Civic. A year later, she quitted the party and joined the team of Jasper Tsang, former President of the Legislative Council, as an advisor. She was elected as an executive of Law Society and appointed as a committee member of Independent Commission Against Corruption in 2019 and 2020 respectively.

In 2021, Kong was elected as a member of the Legislative Council after winning in the Election Committee constituency controlled by pro-Beijing camp. During the campaign, she called on the Government to speed-up the legislation of Article 23, a provision in Basic Law related to national security.

In July 2022, Kong was critical of foreign domestic helpers, who were operating food stalls on public pavement.

In October 2022, Kong criticized the government and Lo Chung-mau for invalidating 20,000 COVID-19 vaccine exemption passes, stating that he had no legal authority to do so, with Kong asking "Who is destroying the rule of law now?"

In February 2023, Kong criticized the government for planning to impose extra betting taxes on the Hong Kong Jockey Club, saying it was unfair.

In March 2023, she championed the cause of Chan Tan-ching a 90 year old licensed street hawker whose cart was seized by the Food and Hygiene Department

In March 2023, Kong was the only lawmaker to vote against a measure to build temporary public housing.

In June 2024, Kong advocated for a revision of Hong Kong's pet quarantine laws. Hong Kong requires a quarantine of 120 days which is the longest in the world; only shared by Guam and Hawaii. Kong described these requirements as "outdated" and linked them to pet smuggling syndicates from mainland China.

== Electoral performances ==
2021 Legislative Council election: Election Committee
Party	Candidate	Votes	%	±%
BPA (KWND)	Leung Mei-fun	1,348	94.93	
DAB	Cheung Kwok-kwan	1,342	94.51	
FEW	Tang Fei	1,339	94.30	
Nonpartisan	Maggie Chan Man-ki	1,331	93.73	
FTU	Alice Mak Mei-kuen	1,326	93.38	
DAB	Elizabeth Quat	1,322	93.10	
NPP (Civil Force)	Yung Hoi-yan	1,313	92.46	
Nonpartisan	Hoey Simon Lee	1,308	92.11	
Nonpartisan	Stephen Wong Yuen-shan	1,305	91.90	
DAB	Rock Chen Chung-nin	1,297	91.34	
Nonpartisan	Chan Hoi-yan	1,292	90.99	
Nonpartisan	Carmen Kan Wai-mun	1,291	90.92	
NPP	Judy Kapui Chan	1,284	90.42	
Independent	Paul Tse Wai-chun	1,283	90.35	
Nonpartisan	Junius Ho Kwan-yiu	1,263	88.94	
Nonpartisan	Tan Yueheng	1,245	87.68	
Nonpartisan	Chan Siu-hung	1,239	87.25	
Nonpartisan	Ng Kit-chong	1,239	87.25	
NPP	Lai Tung-kwok	1,237	87.11	
New Forum	Ma Fung-kwok	1,234	86.90	
Nonpartisan	Lau Chi-pang	1,214	85.49	
Nonpartisan	Chan Pui-leung	1,205	84.86	
FTU	Kingsley Wong Kwok	1,192	83.94	
Nonpartisan	Chan Yuet-ming	1,187	83.59	
DAB	Nixie Lam Lam	1,181	83.17	
FTU	Luk Chung-hung	1,178	82.96	
Nonpartisan	Kenneth Leung Yuk-wai	1,160	81.69	
Nonpartisan	Dennis Lam Shun-chiu	1,157	81.48	
Nonpartisan	Wendy Hong Wen	1,142	80.42	
Nonpartisan	Sun Dong	1,124	79.15	
DAB	Lillian Kwok Ling-lai	1,122	79.01	
Nonpartisan	Peter Douglas Koon Ho-ming	1,102	77.61	
Nonpartisan	Chow Man-kong	1,060	74.65	
Liberal	Lee Chun-keung	1,060	74.65	
BPA	Benson Luk Hoi-man	1,059	74.58	
Nonpartisan	Doreen Kong Yuk-foon	1,032	72.68	
Nonpartisan	Andrew Lam Siu-lo	1,026	72.25	
Nonpartisan	So Cheung-wing	1,013	71.34	
FLU	Lam Chun-sing	1,002	70.56	
Nonpartisan	Nelson Lam Chi-yuen	970	68.31	
Nonpartisan	Charles Ng Wang-wai	958	67.46	
Nonpartisan	Wong Chi-him	956	67.32	
Nonpartisan	Allan Zeman	955	67.25	
DAB	Chan Hoi-wing	941	66.27	
Nonpartisan	Tseng Chin-i	919	64.72	
Independent	Kevin Sun Wei-yung	891	62.75	
Nonpartisan	Tu Hai-ming	834	58.73	
FTU	Choy Wing-keung	818	57.61	
Nonpartisan	Fung Wai-kwong	708	49.86	
Nonpartisan	Michael John Treloar Rowse	454	31.97	
Nonpartisan	Diu Sing-hung	342	24.08	
Total valid votes		1,420	100.00	
Rejected ballots		6		
Turnout		1,426	98.48	
Registered electors		1,448		

Eastern District Council Election, 2015: Kornhill Garden
Party	Candidate	Votes	%	±%
Civic	Leung Siu-sun	2,384	56.8	+13.7
NPP	Doreen Kong Yuk-foon	1,814	43.2	
Majority		570	13.6	+10.8
Turnout		4,233	54.6	
Civic hold		Swing		
