= Kenneth Leung Yuk-wai =

Hong Kong politician

The Honourable Leung Yuk-wai JP
- 梁毓偉
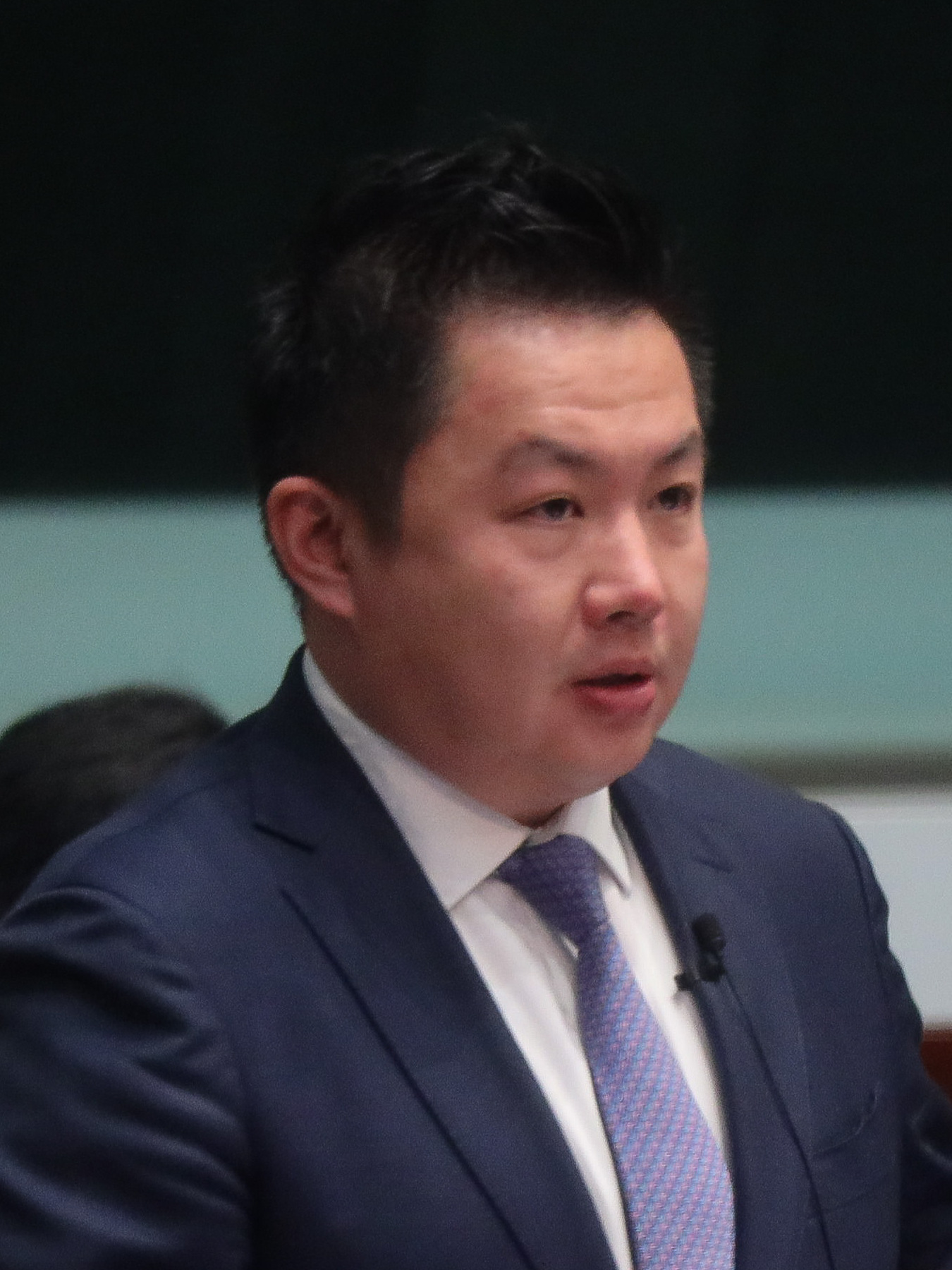
- Leung in 2023

Member of the Legislative Council
- In office 1 January 2022 – 31 December 2025
- Preceded by: Constituency created
- Constituency: Election Committee

Personal details
- Born: 3 March 1984 (age 42) Hong Kong
- Citizenship: Chinese
- Education: King's College London

Kenneth Leung Yuk-wai, JP (Chinese: 梁毓偉, born 1984) is a Hong Kong politician and businessman. He is a former member of the Legislative Council for the Election Committee constituency, and chairman of Hong Kong United Youth Association, and a standing committee member of the 13th All-China Youth Federation.

== Biography ==
Born and raised in Kowloon City of Hong Kong, Leung Yuk-wai's ancestry originates from Dongguan, Guangdong. He obtained a Bachelor of Business Administration and a Master of International Management from King's College between 2005 and 2006. He returned to Hong Kong in 2010 and actively present in the scenes of public services. He is especially interested in the communication channels between youths of mainland China and Hong Kong, and strives to create platforms and opportunities for encouraging further developments of communications. He is currently in charge of different government roles from both mainland China and Hong Kong, as well as titles from private sectors.

He was one of the members of the Legislative Council for the Election Committee constituency which was newly created under the electoral overhaul imposed by Beijing. He was awarded with the Chief Executive's Commendation for Community Service and Justice of the Peace from Government of Hong Kong respectively in 2016 and 2020, as well as receiving the Excellent committee award from Guangdong Youth Federation for 2 years in 2018 and 2019 consecutively.

On 5 January 2022, Carrie Lam announced new warnings and restrictions against social gathering due to potential COVID-19 outbreaks. One day later, it was discovered that Leung attended a birthday party hosted by Witman Hung Wai-man, with 222 guests. At least one guest tested positive with COVID-19, causing many guests to be quarantined.

Leung chose not to seek re-election in 2025.

== Public Services ==
National duties

- Standing Committee Member of the 13th All-China Youth Federation (All-China Youth Federation)

Youth Affairs

- Member of Government of Hong Kong's Youth Development Commission
- Chief Consultant of Hong Kong Youths Unified Association

== Electoral history ==
2021 Legislative Council election: Election Committee
Party	Candidate	Votes	%	±%
BPA (KWND)	Leung Mei-fun	1,348	94.93	
DAB	Cheung Kwok-kwan	1,342	94.51	
FEW	Tang Fei	1,339	94.30	
Nonpartisan	Maggie Chan Man-ki	1,331	93.73	
FTU	Alice Mak Mei-kuen	1,326	93.38	
DAB	Elizabeth Quat	1,322	93.10	
NPP (Civil Force)	Yung Hoi-yan	1,313	92.46	
Nonpartisan	Hoey Simon Lee	1,308	92.11	
Nonpartisan	Stephen Wong Yuen-shan	1,305	91.90	
DAB	Rock Chen Chung-nin	1,297	91.34	
Nonpartisan	Chan Hoi-yan	1,292	90.99	
Nonpartisan	Carmen Kan Wai-mun	1,291	90.92	
NPP	Judy Kapui Chan	1,284	90.42	
Independent	Paul Tse Wai-chun	1,283	90.35	
Nonpartisan	Junius Ho Kwan-yiu	1,263	88.94	
Nonpartisan	Tan Yueheng	1,245	87.68	
Nonpartisan	Chan Siu-hung	1,239	87.25	
Nonpartisan	Ng Kit-chong	1,239	87.25	
NPP	Lai Tung-kwok	1,237	87.11	
New Forum	Ma Fung-kwok	1,234	86.90	
Nonpartisan	Lau Chi-pang	1,214	85.49	
Nonpartisan	Chan Pui-leung	1,205	84.86	
FTU	Kingsley Wong Kwok	1,192	83.94	
Nonpartisan	Chan Yuet-ming	1,187	83.59	
DAB	Nixie Lam Lam	1,181	83.17	
FTU	Luk Chung-hung	1,178	82.96	
Nonpartisan	Kenneth Leung Yuk-wai	1,160	81.69	
Nonpartisan	Dennis Lam Shun-chiu	1,157	81.48	
Nonpartisan	Wendy Hong Wen	1,142	80.42	
Nonpartisan	Sun Dong	1,124	79.15	
DAB	Lillian Kwok Ling-lai	1,122	79.01	
Nonpartisan	Peter Douglas Koon Ho-ming	1,102	77.61	
Nonpartisan	Chow Man-kong	1,060	74.65	
Liberal	Lee Chun-keung	1,060	74.65	
BPA	Benson Luk Hoi-man	1,059	74.58	
Nonpartisan	Doreen Kong Yuk-foon	1,032	72.68	
Nonpartisan	Andrew Lam Siu-lo	1,026	72.25	
Nonpartisan	So Cheung-wing	1,013	71.34	
FLU	Lam Chun-sing	1,002	70.56	
Nonpartisan	Nelson Lam Chi-yuen	970	68.31	
Nonpartisan	Charles Ng Wang-wai	958	67.46	
Nonpartisan	Wong Chi-him	956	67.32	
Nonpartisan	Allan Zeman	955	67.25	
DAB	Chan Hoi-wing	941	66.27	
Nonpartisan	Tseng Chin-i	919	64.72	
Independent	Kevin Sun Wei-yung	891	62.75	
Nonpartisan	Tu Hai-ming	834	58.73	
FTU	Choy Wing-keung	818	57.61	
Nonpartisan	Fung Wai-kwong	708	49.86	
Nonpartisan	Michael John Treloar Rowse	454	31.97	
Nonpartisan	Diu Sing-hung	342	24.08	
Total valid votes		1,420	100.00	
Rejected ballots		6		
Turnout		1,426	98.48	
Registered electors		1,448		
