= Lee Chun-keung =

Hong Kong engineer and politician

The Honourable Lee Chun-keung
- 李鎮強
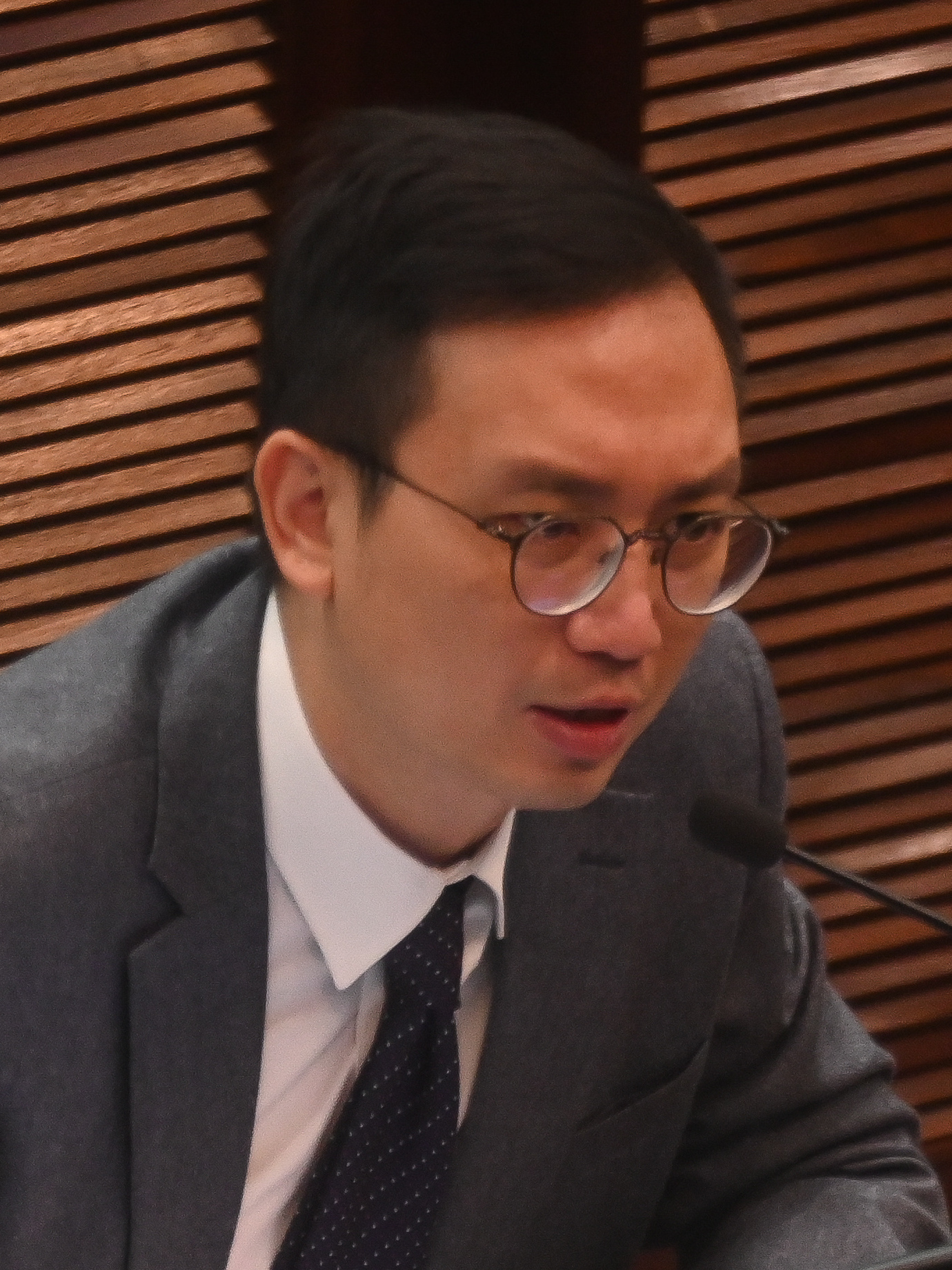
- Lee in 2023

Member of the Legislative Council
- Incumbent
- Assumed office 1 January 2022
- Preceded by: Constituency created
- Constituency: Election Committee

Member of the Eastern District Council
- In office 1 January 2012 – 31 December 2019
- Preceded by: Lui Chi-man
- Succeeded by: Peter Choi Chi-keung
- Constituency: Tsui Tak

Personal details
- Born: 22 August 1976 (age 50) British Hong Kong
- Party: Liberal
- Spouse: Irene Choi (m. 2003)
- Children: 1 son, 1 daughter
- Education: Lehigh University (BSc)
- Occupation: Engineer

Michael Lee Chun-keung (born 22 August 1976) is a Hong Kong engineer and politician. Currently serving as the vice-chairperson of Liberal Party, he was elected as a member of Legislative Council for the heavily pro-Beijing camp Election Committee constituency since 2021.

== Early life and ==
Lee grew up in the Eastern District on Hong Kong Island, whose father ran business on electronic engineering. Lee studied in Clementi Secondary School, and pursued his university studying in Lehigh University, Pennsylvania. He returned to Hong Kong after graduated with Bachelor of Science in Electronic engineering in 1997, and worked in electronic companies.

== Political career ==
In 2011 local election, Lee ran in Tsui Tak constituency in Eastern District as the pro-Beijing and pro-business Liberal Party candidate. He beat the incumbent councillor Lui Chi-man and won the seat. He was re-elected in 2015, but was voted out of office in 2019 following the massive pro-democracy protest movement.

Lee became vice-chairman of the Liberal Party in 2016, and entered the Election Committee, a powerful group heavily skewed the pro-Beijing camp that will elect the Chief Executive, in the same year. He was re-elected as the Committee member in 2021, and was later elected as Legislative Council member.

Lee was also appointed as member of several governmental committees.

During the 2021 Hong Kong legislative election, Lee described himself as an engineer. However, after the elections, in his declaration of interests to the government, Lee declared that his sole job since February 2021 was actually an executive at a parking lot management company.

In November 2023, he was part of a group of lawmakers who said that the 2023 Gay Games may infringe on the national security law.

== Personal life ==
Lee married Irene Choi in 2003 and had a son and a daughter together.

== Electoral performances ==
2021 Legislative Council election: Election Committee
Party	Candidate	Votes	%	±%
BPA (KWND)	Leung Mei-fun	1,348	94.93	
DAB	Cheung Kwok-kwan	1,342	94.51	
FEW	Tang Fei	1,339	94.30	
Nonpartisan	Maggie Chan Man-ki	1,331	93.73	
FTU	Alice Mak Mei-kuen	1,326	93.38	
DAB	Elizabeth Quat	1,322	93.10	
NPP (Civil Force)	Yung Hoi-yan	1,313	92.46	
Nonpartisan	Hoey Simon Lee	1,308	92.11	
Nonpartisan	Stephen Wong Yuen-shan	1,305	91.90	
DAB	Rock Chen Chung-nin	1,297	91.34	
Nonpartisan	Chan Hoi-yan	1,292	90.99	
Nonpartisan	Carmen Kan Wai-mun	1,291	90.92	
NPP	Judy Kapui Chan	1,284	90.42	
Independent	Paul Tse Wai-chun	1,283	90.35	
Nonpartisan	Junius Ho Kwan-yiu	1,263	88.94	
Nonpartisan	Tan Yueheng	1,245	87.68	
Nonpartisan	Chan Siu-hung	1,239	87.25	
Nonpartisan	Ng Kit-chong	1,239	87.25	
NPP	Lai Tung-kwok	1,237	87.11	
New Forum	Ma Fung-kwok	1,234	86.90	
Nonpartisan	Lau Chi-pang	1,214	85.49	
Nonpartisan	Chan Pui-leung	1,205	84.86	
FTU	Kingsley Wong Kwok	1,192	83.94	
Nonpartisan	Chan Yuet-ming	1,187	83.59	
DAB	Nixie Lam Lam	1,181	83.17	
FTU	Luk Chung-hung	1,178	82.96	
Nonpartisan	Kenneth Leung Yuk-wai	1,160	81.69	
Nonpartisan	Dennis Lam Shun-chiu	1,157	81.48	
Nonpartisan	Wendy Hong Wen	1,142	80.42	
Nonpartisan	Sun Dong	1,124	79.15	
DAB	Lillian Kwok Ling-lai	1,122	79.01	
Nonpartisan	Peter Douglas Koon Ho-ming	1,102	77.61	
Nonpartisan	Chow Man-kong	1,060	74.65	
Liberal	Lee Chun-keung	1,060	74.65	
BPA	Benson Luk Hoi-man	1,059	74.58	
Nonpartisan	Doreen Kong Yuk-foon	1,032	72.68	
Nonpartisan	Andrew Lam Siu-lo	1,026	72.25	
Nonpartisan	So Cheung-wing	1,013	71.34	
FLU	Lam Chun-sing	1,002	70.56	
Nonpartisan	Nelson Lam Chi-yuen	970	68.31	
Nonpartisan	Charles Ng Wang-wai	958	67.46	
Nonpartisan	Wong Chi-him	956	67.32	
Nonpartisan	Allan Zeman	955	67.25	
DAB	Chan Hoi-wing	941	66.27	
Nonpartisan	Tseng Chin-i	919	64.72	
Independent	Kevin Sun Wei-yung	891	62.75	
Nonpartisan	Tu Hai-ming	834	58.73	
FTU	Choy Wing-keung	818	57.61	
Nonpartisan	Fung Wai-kwong	708	49.86	
Nonpartisan	Michael John Treloar Rowse	454	31.97	
Nonpartisan	Diu Sing-hung	342	24.08	
Total valid votes		1,420	100.00	
Rejected ballots		6		
Turnout		1,426	98.48	
Registered electors		1,448		

Eastern District Council Election, 2019: Tsui Tak
Party	Candidate	Votes	%	±%
Nonpartisan	Peter Choi Chi-keung	2,994	53.41	
Liberal	Lee Chun-keung	2,612	46.59	
Majority		382	6.82	
Turnout		5,261	75.11	
Nonpartisan gain from Liberal		Swing		

Eastern District Council Election, 2015: Tsui Tak
Party	Candidate	Votes	%	±%
Liberal	Lee Chun-keung	2,351	70.60	+14.68
Ind. democrat	Li Kin-hang	979	29.40	
Majority		1,372	41.20	+29.36
Liberal hold		Swing		

Eastern District Council Election, 2011: Tsui Tak
Party	Candidate	Votes	%	±%
Liberal	Lee Chun-keung	1,355	55.46	
Ind. democrat	Lui Chi-man	1,088	44.54	−17.21
Majority		267	10.93	−12.58
Liberal gain from Ind. democrat		Swing		

== Footnote ==
Legislative Council of Hong Kong
New constituency	Member of Legislative Council; Representative for Election Committee; 2022–present	Incumbent
