= Hoey Simon Lee =

Hong Kong politician

The Honourable Hoey Simon Lee MH JP
- 李浩然博士
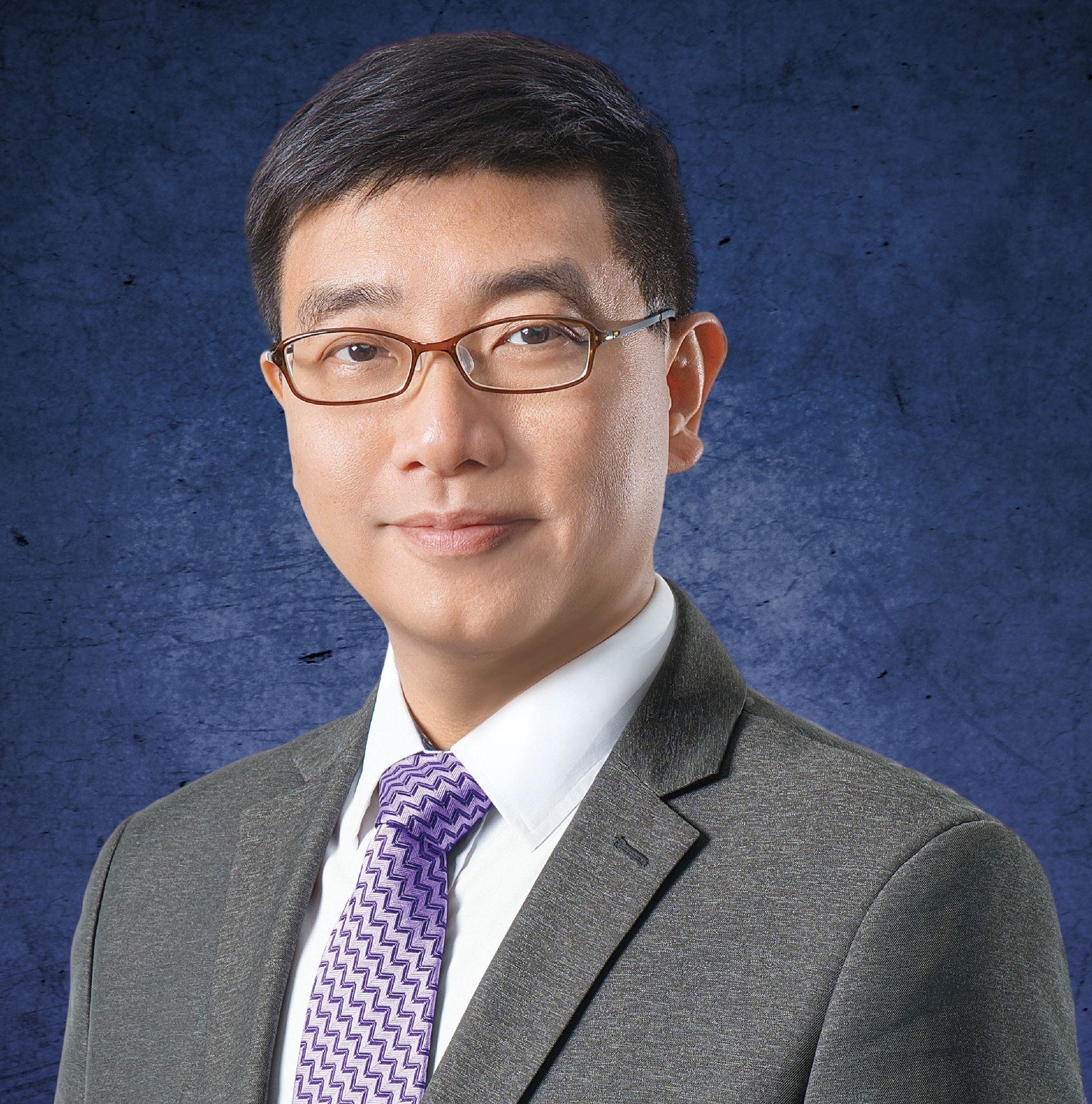
- Dr. Lee Hoey Simon

Member of the Legislative Council
- Incumbent
- Assumed office 1 January 2022
- Preceded by: Constituency created
- Constituency: Election Committee

Personal details
- Education: Hong Kong Baptist University (BSocSc); Tsinghua University (LLB, PhD); University of London (MSc); Chinese University of Hong Kong (MPhil)

Dr. Lee Hoey Simon, MH, JP (Chinese: 李浩然) holds a Doctor of Laws in Constitutional Law from the School of Law, Tsinghua University, with a focus on constitution and Basic Law studies; he also obtained his Bachelor of Laws from the same institution. He earned a Master of Science in Politics, Sociology and Development from SOAS, University of London, and a Master of Philosophy in Politics and Public Administration from The Chinese University of Hong Kong. He also studied at the Faculty of Law, The University of Hong Kong. His academic foundation began with a Bachelor of Social Sciences (Honours) in Politics and International Relations from Hong Kong Baptist University.

Dr. Lee has authored numerous publications, including: A Study on the Hong Kong Basic Law Drafting Materials; Hong Kong Basic Law: Case Studies (Volumes I & II); The Belt and Road Initiative: China's Role From World Factory to Global Engineer; Governance through Law; A Study on the Methods for Selecting the Chief Executive; Statistical Hong Kong: 20 Years after the Handover; WTO in Transition: Technological Innovation Reshaping International Rules; Understanding the Basic Law: An In-depth Reading of the General Principles and Legislative Intent; A Study on Rule of Law and Governance in Hong Kong under “One Country, Two Systems”; "A Study on National Security Law and Hong Kong Basic Law Article 23; Statistical Greater Bay Area; The Basic Law and Hong Kong: The 25th Anniversary of Reunification with the Motherland; A Reference Bibliography on the Constitution and the Basic Law; The Choice of Nationality: A Study on Hong Kong Permanent Resident Status and Towards the Second Decade: A Ten-Year Review of China‘s Belt and Road Initiative.

Dr. Lee currently serves as a Member of the Committee for the Basic Law of the HKSAR under the National People’s Congress Standing Committee, Member of the Legislative Council of the HKSAR, Member of the Commercial (Third) Subsector of the Election Committee of the HKSAR, Member of the Beijing Municipal Committee of the Chinese People‘s Political Consultative Conference, Chief Strategy Officer of China Resources Group (Greater Bay Area), Director and Vice President of China Resources Enterprise, Independent Director of Bank of Guizhou, and Chairperson of the Basic Law Foundation. He previously served as the Deputy Governor in the Xifeng County of GuiZhou Province, overseeing poverty alleviation efforts and supervising the bureaus of education, justice, health, legal affairs, and policy research. He was also Director of the Strategic Management Department of China Resources Group, Director of the Hong Kong and Overseas Research Office under the Strategic Research Centre, responsible for overseas investment, and Dean of the China Resources Research Institute of Science and Technology, where he oversaw innovation and technology initiatives in Hong Kong, including facilitating eight projects under the first phase of the HKSAR Government’s “Research, Academic and Industry Sectors Collaboration Scheme” (with a total of 24 projects in Phase 1). Under his leadership, the Institute became the first Chinese-funded enterprise research institute in Hong Kong to be granted the “Designated Local Research Institution (DLRI)” status by the HKSAR Government and was also among the first batch of R&D institutions to set up operations in the Hetao Shenzhen-Hong Kong Science and Technology Innovation Cooperation Zone. He also previously served as Deputy Executive Director of Our Hong Kong Foundation, overseeing research work.

Dr. Lee is also Chairperson of the CDC Standing Committee on Values Education of the HKSAR Education Bureau, Chairperson of the Hok Yau Club, Member of the Court and the Council of the University of Hong Kong, Member of the Court, Advisor to the Advisory Committee for National Security Education of Hong Kong Baptist University, and Advisor to the Education and Youth Development Advisory Group of The Education University of Hong Kong. He previously served as Consultant to the Harvard Law School (PIFS), Distinguished Professor of the School of Management at Zhejiang Shuren University, Programme Advisor to the Faculty of Business Administration of Hong Kong Baptist University and City University of Hong Kong, Member of the Board of Yew Chung College of Early Childhood Education, the Director of the Chinese Association of Hong Kong & Macao Studies, the Convener for the "Hong Kong in the Belt and Road Initiatives" Study of Counsellors’ Office of the State Council of China, the Youth member of the Central Policy Unit of the HKSAR Government, Convener of the Basic Law Promotion Steering Committee's Working Group on Teachers and Students, Consultant to the Harvard Law School (PIFS), Visiting Fellow (2013) at the CCPL and Faculty of Law HKU.

In recognition of his outstanding contributions to Basic Law research and education, Dr. Lee was awarded the Medal of Honour (M.H.) by the HKSAR Government in 2016, was elected one of the “Hong Kong Ten Outstanding Young Persons” in 2017 and was appointed Justice of the Peace (J.P.) in 2019.

== Electoral history ==
2021 Legislative Council election: Election Committee
Party	Candidate	Votes	%	±%
BPA (KWND)	Leung Mei-fun	1,348	94.93	
DAB	Cheung Kwok-kwan	1,342	94.51	
FEW	Tang Fei	1,339	94.30	
Nonpartisan	Maggie Chan Man-ki	1,331	93.73	
FTU	Alice Mak Mei-kuen	1,326	93.38	
DAB	Elizabeth Quat	1,322	93.10	
NPP (Civil Force)	Yung Hoi-yan	1,313	92.46	
Nonpartisan	Hoey Simon Lee	1,308	92.11	
Nonpartisan	Stephen Wong Yuen-shan	1,305	91.90	
DAB	Rock Chen Chung-nin	1,297	91.34	
Nonpartisan	Chan Hoi-yan	1,292	90.99	
Nonpartisan	Carmen Kan Wai-mun	1,291	90.92	
NPP	Judy Kapui Chan	1,284	90.42	
Independent	Paul Tse Wai-chun	1,283	90.35	
Nonpartisan	Junius Ho Kwan-yiu	1,263	88.94	
Nonpartisan	Tan Yueheng	1,245	87.68	
Nonpartisan	Chan Siu-hung	1,239	87.25	
Nonpartisan	Ng Kit-chong	1,239	87.25	
NPP	Lai Tung-kwok	1,237	87.11	
New Forum	Ma Fung-kwok	1,234	86.90	
Nonpartisan	Lau Chi-pang	1,214	85.49	
Nonpartisan	Chan Pui-leung	1,205	84.86	
FTU	Kingsley Wong Kwok	1,192	83.94	
Nonpartisan	Chan Yuet-ming	1,187	83.59	
DAB	Nixie Lam Lam	1,181	83.17	
FTU	Luk Chung-hung	1,178	82.96	
Nonpartisan	Kenneth Leung Yuk-wai	1,160	81.69	
Nonpartisan	Dennis Lam Shun-chiu	1,157	81.48	
Nonpartisan	Wendy Hong Wen	1,142	80.42	
Nonpartisan	Sun Dong	1,124	79.15	
DAB	Lillian Kwok Ling-lai	1,122	79.01	
Nonpartisan	Peter Douglas Koon Ho-ming	1,102	77.61	
Nonpartisan	Chow Man-kong	1,060	74.65	
Liberal	Lee Chun-keung	1,060	74.65	
BPA	Benson Luk Hoi-man	1,059	74.58	
Nonpartisan	Doreen Kong Yuk-foon	1,032	72.68	
Nonpartisan	Andrew Lam Siu-lo	1,026	72.25	
Nonpartisan	So Cheung-wing	1,013	71.34	
FLU	Lam Chun-sing	1,002	70.56	
Nonpartisan	Nelson Lam Chi-yuen	970	68.31	
Nonpartisan	Charles Ng Wang-wai	958	67.46	
Nonpartisan	Wong Chi-him	956	67.32	
Nonpartisan	Allan Zeman	955	67.25	
DAB	Chan Hoi-wing	941	66.27	
Nonpartisan	Tseng Chin-i	919	64.72	
Independent	Kevin Sun Wei-yung	891	62.75	
Nonpartisan	Tu Hai-ming	834	58.73	
FTU	Choy Wing-keung	818	57.61	
Nonpartisan	Fung Wai-kwong	708	49.86	
Nonpartisan	Michael John Treloar Rowse	454	31.97	
Nonpartisan	Diu Sing-hung	342	24.08	
Total valid votes		1,420	100.00	
Rejected ballots		6		
Turnout		1,426	98.48	
Registered electors		1,448		

Legislative Council of Hong Kong
New constituency	Member of Legislative Council; Representative for Election Committee; 2022–present	Incumbent
