= Kornhill Garden (constituency) =

Hong Kong constituency

- Elected constituency for the Eastern District Council
- Boundary of Kornhill Garden in Eastern District
- District: Eastern
- Legislative Council constituency: Hong Kong Island East
- Population: 13,806 (2019)
- Electorate: 8,313 (2019)

Current constituency
- Created: 1994
- Number of members: One
- Member: Vacant
- Created from: Kornhill; Quarry Bay North

Kornhill Garden (Chinese: 康山) is one of the 35 constituencies in the Eastern District.

The constituency returns one district councillor to the Eastern District Council, with an election every four years. The seat is last held by Leung Siu-sun of the Civic Party.

Kornhill Garden constituency is loosely based on Kornhill Gardens in Quarry Bay with estimated population of 13,806.

== Councillors represented ==
Election	Member	Party
1994	Christina Ting Yuk-chee	Nonpartisan
1999	Patrick Leung Siu-sun→Vacant (Note: Resigned on 9 July 2021.)	Nonpartisan
2003	Patrick Leung Siu-sun→Vacant	Nonpartisan
2007	Patrick Leung Siu-sun→Vacant	Civic
2011	Patrick Leung Siu-sun→Vacant	Civic
2015	Patrick Leung Siu-sun→Vacant	Civic
2019	Patrick Leung Siu-sun→Vacant	Civic

== Election results ==
=== 2010s ===
Eastern District Council Election, 2019: Kornhill Garden
Party	Candidate	Votes	%	±%
Civic	Patrick Leung Siu-sun	3,727	59.24	+2.44
NPP	Dana Lau Sing-she	2,564	40.76	−2.44
Majority		1,163	18.48	
Turnout		6,305	75.86	
Civic hold		Swing		

Eastern District Council Election, 2015: Kornhill Garden
Party	Candidate	Votes	%	±%
Civic	Leung Siu-sun	2,384	56.8	+13.7
NPP	Doreen Kong Yuk-foon	1,814	43.2	
Majority		570	13.6	+10.8
Turnout		4,233	54.6	
Civic hold		Swing		

Eastern District Council Election, 2011: Kornhill Garden
Party	Candidate	Votes	%	±%
Civic	Leung Siu-sun	1,350	43.1	–14.8
Nonpartisan	Rhoda Liu Mei-ling	1,295	41.3	–0.8
Nonpartisan	Hung Hin-tim	490	15.6	
Majority		55	1.8	–14.0
Civic hold		Swing		

=== 2000s ===
Eastern District Council Election, 2007: Kornhill Garden
Party	Candidate	Votes	%	±%
Civic	Leung Siu-sun	1,599	57.9	–3.5
Nonpartisan	Rhoda Liu Mei-ling	1,165	42.1	+3.5
Majority		434	15.8	–7.5
Civic hold		Swing	–3.5	

Eastern District Council Election, 2003: Kornhill Garden
Party	Candidate	Votes	%	±%
Nonpartisan	Leung Siu-sun	1,793	61.4	–7.1
Nonpartisan	Rhoda Liu Mei-ling	1,128	38.6	
Majority		665	22.8	+14.5
Nonpartisan hold		Swing		

=== 1990s ===
Eastern District Council Election, 1999: Kornhill Garden
Party	Candidate	Votes	%	±%
Nonpartisan	Leung Siu-sun	1,479	68.5	
HKPA	Wong Wang-tai	653	30.2	
Majority		826	38.3	+30.0
Nonpartisan hold		Swing		

Eastern District Board Election, 1994: Kornhill Garden
Party	Candidate	Votes	%	±%
Nonpartisan	Christina Ting Yuk-chee	1,524	53.8	
Democratic	Yeung Yuet-ching	1,288	45.5	
Majority		236	8.3	
Nonpartisan win (new seat)				
