= Francis Cheng =

TV host from Hong Kong

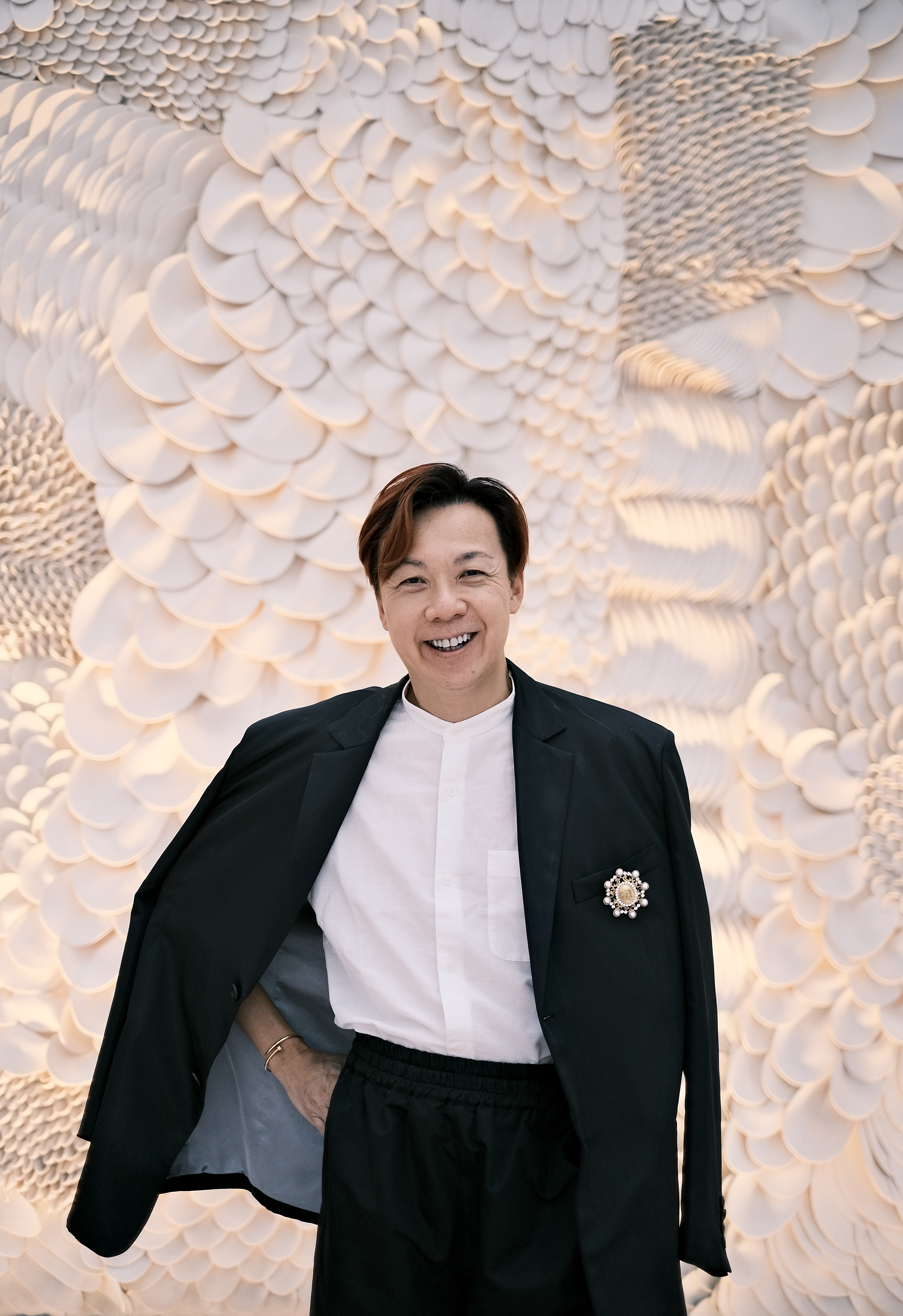

Francis Cheng (Chinese: 鄭紹康) is a Hong Kong public relations consultant, talent manager and television host. He has worked in public relations, marketing promotion and artist management for over 30 years. He previously worked at Occasions Asia Pacific and founded Number One PR Communication Limited in 2016. He participates in social events and media platforms in Hong Kong and serves on committees of the UNICEF Hong Kong Committee and the Hong Kong Ocean Park Conservation Fund.

== Early life ==
Francis was born in Hong Kong. In his early years he studied at St. Joseph’s College, then moved to Vancouver, Canada to study at Simon Fraser University. During his time in Canada he was exposed to multicultural environments and developed multilingual and communication skills, which became the foundation of his public relations career. After completing his university studies, he returned to Hong Kong to develop his career.

== Education ==
Francis graduated from the Communication Studies Department of Simon Fraser University in Canada, majoring in journalism and communication. From 2006 to 2008 he obtained a Master of Business Administration degree from the University of Hong Kong. He has also served as a guest lecturer at the University of Hong Kong, Peking University, Hong Kong Polytechnic University and the Chinese University of Hong Kong on topics related to public relations and marketing promotion.

== Career ==
=== Early career ===
After returning to Hong Kong from Canada, Francis worked with Dr. Allan Zeman on public relations for the Lan Kwai Fong Group’s restaurant businesses in Hong Kong and Shanghai. He served as Public Relations Director and was responsible for brand promotion and event planning.

=== Occasions Asia Pacific period ===
In 2001 He joined Occasions Asia Pacific Limited, founded by Pansy Ho. He rose to the position of CEO. During his tenure he handled public relations and marketing projects in Paris, Milan, Dubai, Japan, Korea, Thailand, Beijing, Shanghai, Guangzhou, Shenzhen and Hong Kong, working with high-end brands and celebrity events. His responsibilities included personal public relations and crisis management.

=== Independent venture ===
In 2016 He established his own company, Number One PR Communication Limited, focusing on public relations, marketing promotion and artist management. The company’s clients include TVB artists, globally renowned brands and enterprises, Hong Kong SAR Government departments, international high-profile clients and bloggers. The business covers brand event planning and crisis management. He also serves as a columnist and programme host. He manages several artists, including Hilary Tsui.

== Hosting programmes ==
Francis has hosted the interview programme series Number One Friend and Number One Friend 2 on Hong Kong Open TV.

He also hosts Supreme Life on Metro Broadcast’s News Channel, which started broadcasting on 3 August 2023, every Thursday from 9:00 pm to 10:00 pm.

== Recent activities ==
In recent years Francis has been active on platforms such as Xiaohongshu, Douyin and Instagram, sharing daily luxury outfits, gourmet tasting, lifestyle and PR industry information.

== Charity and social activities ==
Francis participates in multiple charitable activities, including serving as a member of the Communications and Innovation Committee of the UNICEF Hong Kong Committee, promoting children’s rights advocacy and fundraising.

He is also a member of the Fundraising Committee of the Hong Kong Ocean Park Conservation Fund, participating in environmental activities such as the “OPCFHK Charity”. He has supported the Hong Kong Cancer Fund for many years.

In 2015 he organised an amfAR (American Foundation for AIDS Research) charity gala in Hong Kong, inviting international celebrities including Victoria Beckham, Michelle Yeoh, T.O.P from South Korea’s BIGBANG, Naomi Campbell, Lang Lang, Adrien Brody, Kate Moss and Uma Thurman.
