= Tai Koo Shing East (constituency) =

Constituency of the Eastern District Council of Hong Kong

- Elected constituency for the Eastern District Council
- Boundary of Tai Koo Shing East in Eastern District
- District: Eastern
- Legislative Council constituency: Hong Kong Island East
- Population: 18,063 (2019)
- Electorate: 10,546 (2019)

Current constituency
- Created: 1994
- Number of members: One
- Member: Vacant
- Created from: Taikoo Shing

Tai Koo Shing East is a constituency located in the Eastern District of Hong Kong.

The constituency returns one district councillor to the Eastern District Council, with an election every four years. The seat was last held by nonpartisan Patrick Wong Chun-sing.

Tai Koo Shing East constituency is loosely based on eastern part of Taikoo Shing with estimated population of 18,063.

== Councillors represented ==
Election	Member	Party	%
1994	Tso Hon-kwong	Independent→Democratic	60.69
1999	Tso Hon-kwong	Democratic→Independent	73.66
2003	Tso Hon-kwong	Independent	76.47
2007	Tso Hon-kwong	Independent	68.23
2011	Marcus Tse Tsz-kei	NPP	58.28
2015	Patrick Wong Chun-sing→Vacant (Note: Resigned on 8 July 2021.)	Independent	50.83
2019	Patrick Wong Chun-sing→Vacant	Independent	60.95

== Election results ==
=== 2010s ===
Eastern District Council Election, 2019: Tai Koo Shing East
Party	Candidate	Votes	%	±%
Ind. democrat	Patrick Wong Chun-sing	4,848	60.95	+10.15
NPP	Calvin Kwok Ho-king	3,106	39.05	−10.15
Majority		1.742	21.90	
Turnout		7,980	75.67	
Ind. democrat hold		Swing		

Eastern District Council Election, 2015: Tai Koo Shing East
Party	Candidate	Votes	%	±%
Nonpartisan	Patrick Wong Chun-sing	2,674	50.8	
NPP	Marcus Tse Tsz-kei	2,587	49.2	–9.1
Majority		87	1.6	
Turnout		5,311	53.7	
Nonpartisan gain from NPP		Swing		

Eastern District Council Election, 2011: Tai Koo Shing East
Party	Candidate	Votes	%	±%
NPP	Marcus Tse Tsz-kei	2,270	58.3	
Ind. Democrat	Tso Hon-kwong	1,625	41.7	
Majority		645	16.6	
NPP hold		Swing		

=== 2000s ===
Eastern District Council Election, 2007: Tai Koo Shing East
Party	Candidate	Votes	%	±%
Independent	Tso Hon-kwong	2,184	68.2	
DAB	Luk Wai-kit	1,017	31.8	
Majority		1,167	36.4	
Independent hold		Swing		

Eastern District Council Election, 2003: Tai Koo Shing East
Party	Candidate	Votes	%	±%
Nonpartisan	Tso Hon-kwong	2,830	76.5	
DAB	Wong Kau-piu	871	23.5	
Majority		1,959	53.0	
Nonpartisan hold		Swing		

=== 1990s ===
Eastern District Council Election, 1999: Tai Koo Shing East
Party	Candidate	Votes	%	±%
Democratic	Tso Hon-kwong	1,988	73.1	
DAB	Eric Chan Hong	711	26.1	
Majority		1,912	47.0	
Democratic hold		Swing		

Eastern District Board Election, 1994: Tai Koo Shing East
Party	Candidate	Votes	%	±%
Nonpartisan	Tso Hon-kwong	1,487	59.7	
LDF	Wong Tak-lun	963	38.6	
Majority		524	21.1	
Nonpartisan win (new seat)				
