= Tsui Tak (constituency) =

Hong Kong constituency

- 翠德
- Elected constituency for the Eastern District Council
- Boundary of Tsui Tak in Eastern District
- District: Eastern
- Legislative Council constituency: Hong Kong Island East
- Population: 12,568 (2019)
- Electorate: 7,486 (2019)

Current constituency
- Created: 1999
- Number of members: One
- Member: (Vacant)

Tsui Tak (Chinese: 翠德) is one of the 35 constituencies in the Eastern District.

== Background ==
The constituency returns one district councillor to the Eastern District Council, with an election every four years. The seat is lastly held by Peter Choi Chi-keung. Tsui Tak is loosely based on Bayview Park, Koway Court, New Jade Garden, Walton Estate and Yee Tsui Court in Chai Wan with an estimated population of 12,568.

== Councillors represented ==
| Election | Member | Party |
|---|---|---|
| 1999 | Leung Yiu-hung | Independent |
| 2003 | Lui Chi-man | Independent |
| 2011 | Lee Chun-keung | Liberal |
| 2019 | Peter Choi Chi-keung | Nonpartisan |

== Election results ==
=== 2010s ===
Eastern District Council Election, 2019: Tsui Tak
| Party | Candidate | Votes | % | ±% |
|---|---|---|---|---|
| Nonpartisan | Peter Choi Chi-keung | 2,994 | 53.41 | |
| Liberal | Lee Chun-keung | 2,612 | 46.59 | |
| Majority | | 382 | 6.82 | |
| Turnout | | 5,261 | 75.11 | |
| Nonpartisan gain from Liberal | | Swing | | |

Eastern District Council Election, 2015: Tsui Tak
| Party | Candidate | Votes | % | ±% |
|---|---|---|---|---|
| Liberal | Lee Chun-keung | 2,351 | 70.60 | +14.68 |
| Ind. democrat | Li Kin-hang | 979 | 29.40 | |
| Majority | | 1,372 | 41.20 | +29.36 |
| Liberal hold | | Swing | | |

Eastern District Council Election, 2011: Tsui Tak
| Party | Candidate | Votes | % | ±% |
|---|---|---|---|---|
| Liberal | Lee Chun-keung | 1,355 | 55.46 | |
| Ind. democrat | Lui Chi-man | 1,088 | 44.54 | −17.21 |
| Majority | | 267 | 10.93 | −12.58 |
| Liberal gain from Ind. democrat | | Swing | | |
