= Allan Zeman =

Hong Kong business magnate (born 1949)

The Honourable Allan Zeman GBM GBS JP
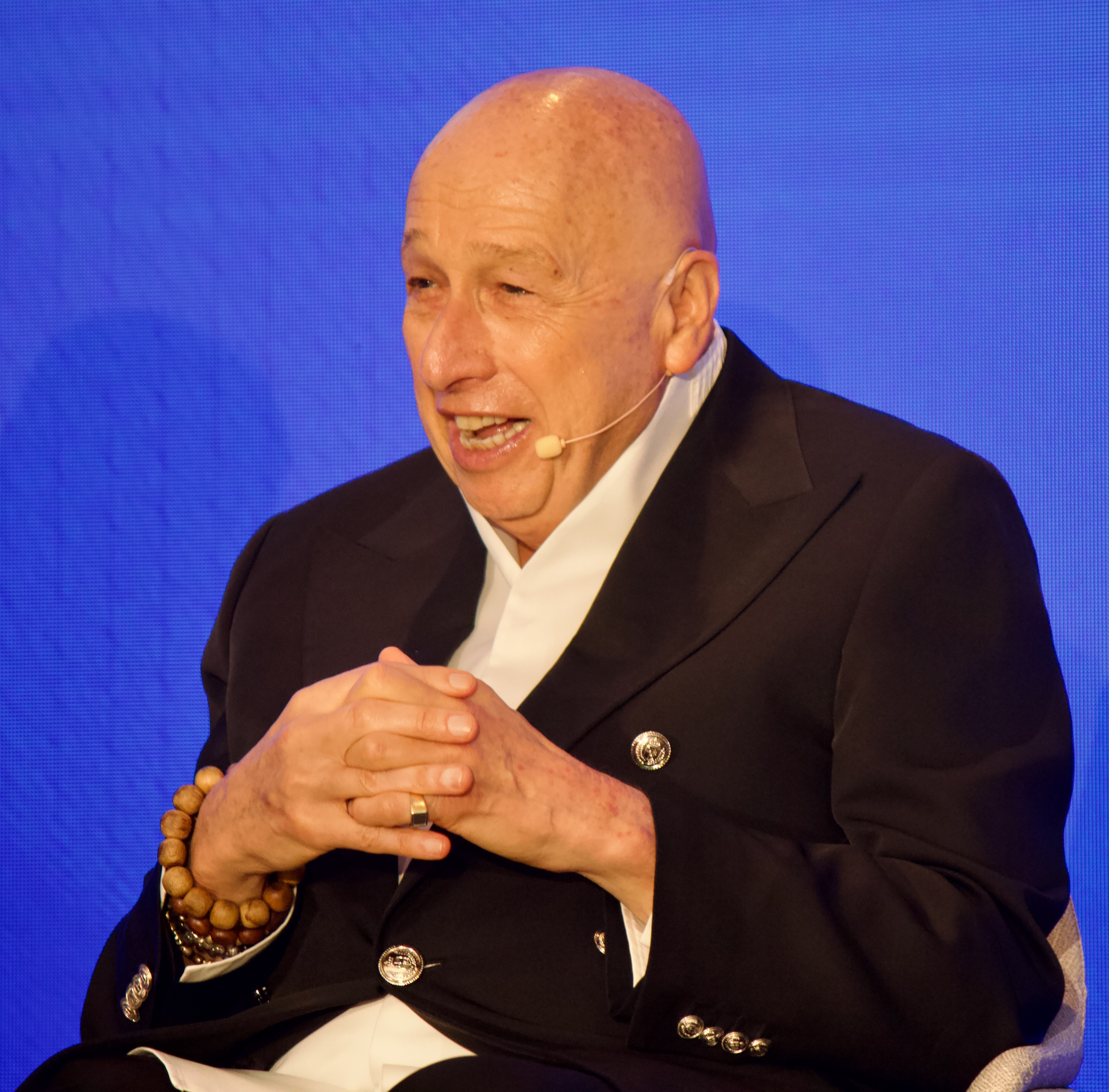
- Zeman in 2025

Personal details
- Born: 18 July 1949 (age 77) Regensburg, West Germany
- Party: New People's Party
- Spouse: Charmaine Zeman
- Children: 2
- Occupation: Entrepreneur
- Known for: Developing Lan Kwai Fong and running Ocean Park in Hong Kong
- Awards: 2001: Justice of the Peace; 2004: Gold Bauhinia Star; 2011: Grand Bauhinia Medal

Allan Zeman
- Chinese: 盛智文
Transcriptions
Standard Mandarin
- Hanyu Pinyin: Shèng Zhìwén
Yue: Cantonese
- Jyutping: sing6 zi3 man4

Allan Zeman GBM GBS JP (Chinese: 盛智文; Jyutping: sing6 zi3 man4; born 18 July 1949) is a Hong Kong business magnate.

== Background and personal life ==
Allan Zeman was born into a Jewish family in Regensburg, West Germany, and was raised in Montreal, Quebec, Canada, where his mother worked in a hospital. When Zeman was seven years old, his father died. He started working at the age of ten. He dropped out of college, and by the age of nineteen, while working for a lingerie company, he had earned his first US$1 million.

He made his first fortune by importing clothes from Hong Kong. He frequently travelled to Hong Kong for work in the 1970s, and eventually moved there in 1975. Zeman is married to Charmaine Zeman; they have two children: Jonathan Zeman and Marisa Zeman-McConnell. He speaks English, French and some Cantonese, and is a teetotaler.

== Career ==
In 1975, Zeman founded Colby International Group to source clothing in China and export it to Canada. In late 2000, by now a much larger and diversified company, Colby was sold to Li & Fung Ltd., a major competitor. In the early 1980s, Zeman felt that Hong Kong had no western restaurant that suited his needs, so in 1983 he opened California Restaurant in Lan Kwai Fong, a narrow street in Central, Hong Kong. He bought the entire block in 1984 and thus launched his career as both an entertainment operator and property developer. In 2000, Zeman sold Colby International for $280 million to Li & Feng.

Through Lan Kwai Fong Holdings Ltd, of which he is chairman, he drove the development of Lan Kwai Fong to be one of the most important bar and night life districts in Hong Kong. He is said to own 65 percent of the district's properties.

Meanwhile, as chairman of Lan Kwai Fong Concepts Holdings Ltd., he controls a number of restaurants in Lan Kwai Fong including LKF Concepts.

=== Chairman of Ocean Park (2003–2014) ===
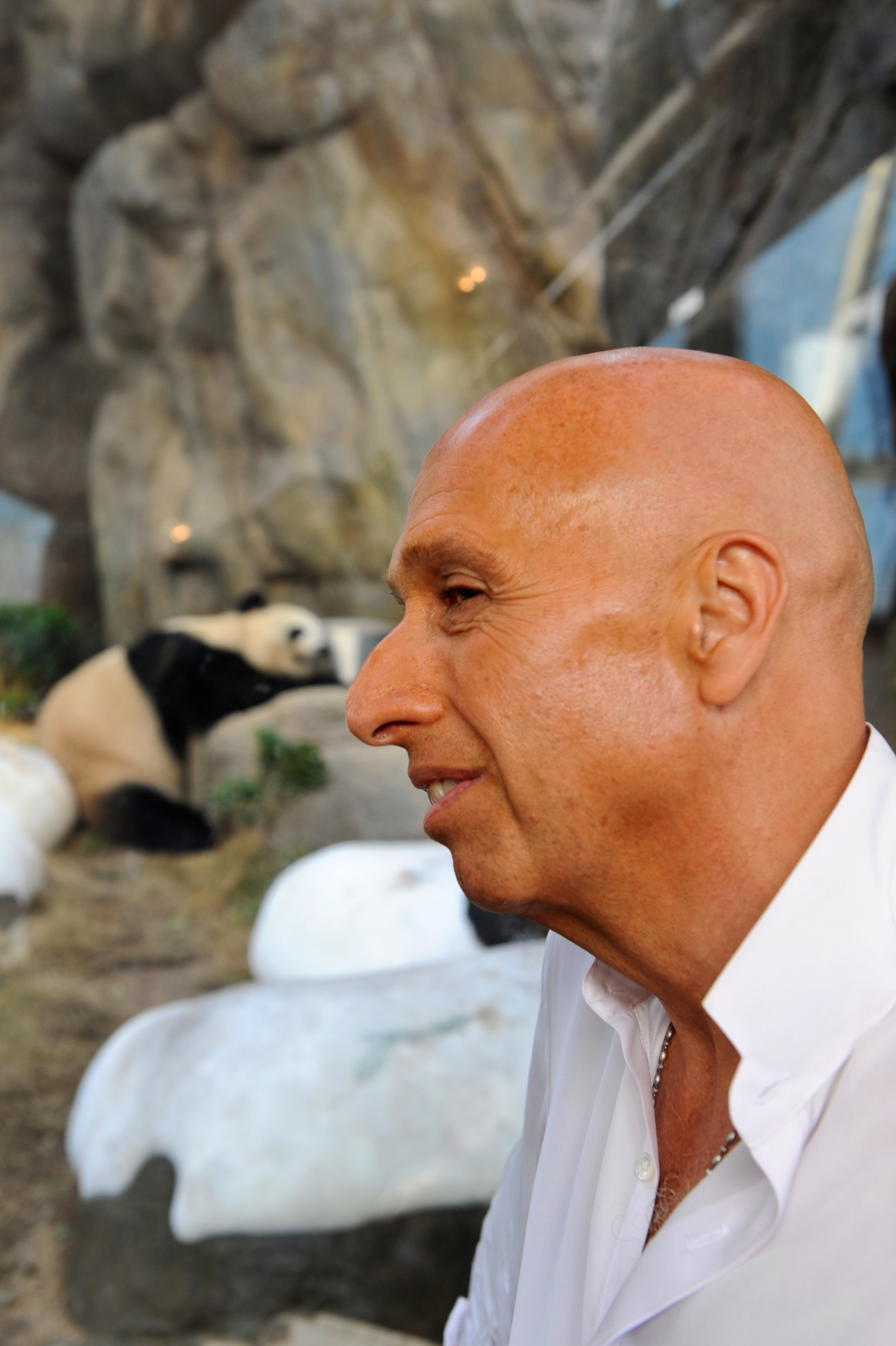
Zeman at Ocean Park in 2009

In July 2003, Zeman was appointed as chairman of Ocean Park Hong Kong by the city's Chief Executive, Tung Chee-hwa. At the time, the park's business was threatened by the incoming Hong Kong Disneyland, the SARS epidemic, and the city's low tourism numbers. As a result, Zeman had initially declined, thinking Tung was "out of his mind", but later took the job after repeated requests by Tung.

Zeman was personally involved in the park's promotion, for which he frequently put on costumes like pumpkins and jellyfish, and once did a helicopter landing dressed as an Eskimo.

"I was there as an icon for the park, dressing up in all these silly costumes that I didn’t enjoy. You can’t always enjoy it. It was free advertising for the park, and we didn’t have the money that Disney had."

— Allan Zeman

In June 2014, Zeman stepped down from chairmanship after 11 years. He revealed that he wished to continue but was forced out by the government. He believes that the decision was due to a government guideline that limited positions on statutory bodies to six-year terms.

During Zeman's chairmanship, the number of visitors to Ocean Park rose from 2.95 million in 2003 to 7.73 million in 2013. The park also went from a HK$4 million deficit in 2003 to a HK$127.2 million surplus. He was dubbed "Hong Kong's Mouse Killer" in 2007 by Forbes magazine for holding off the challenge from Hong Kong Disneyland.

== Honours ==
In 2001, Zeman was appointed a Justice of the Peace in Hong Kong. Zeman was awarded the Gold Bauhinia Star in 2004 and the Grand Bauhinia Medal in 2011.

== Other business interests ==
=== Film and TV ===
A noted film producer, Zeman is chairman of Sweetpea Entertainment Inc., a film production company based in Los Angeles. He is also involved with After Dark Films, a movie company.

=== Fashion ===
As well as having built and sold off the successful Colby group, Zeman is a director of Algo Group, another fashion business. In February 2007, he was named "Stylemaker of the Year" by Style Magazine (published by the South China Morning Post).

=== Property development ===
Zeman is a property developer and built the Andara Resort and Villas in Phuket, Thailand. In 2020 Zeman was working with Richard Li on a villa and golf course development in Phang Nga.

=== Other ===
Zeman is chairman of Mesco Shipyard Ltd (shipbuilding) and DKA Ltd (public relations), and a director of Wynn Resorts. He is a non-executive director of Pacific Century Premium Developments Ltd.

== Political activity ==
He supported Regina Ip, the former Secretary for Security in the 2007 LegCo by-election in the Hong Kong Island constituency. However, she was defeated by Anson Chan.

In 2017, he gave his support to Carrie Lam, who announced on 12 January 2017 that she would run for the Chief Executive role in Hong Kong, which position she gained in March 2017. By mid-2019, he was being cited as an economic adviser to Lam in her Chief Executive role.

In 2019, he supported an independent inquiry into how police clashed with protestors, but has since flipped his position on the inquiry and said the city had moved on. During his 2021 election campaign, his platform supported the safeguarding of national security. Additionally, he commented on universal suffrage, claiming that "I'm not saying never universal suffrage, but if you bring it in too early, it creates divisions."

Zeman ran in the Election Committee constituency of the 2021 Hong Kong legislative election but was not elected.

In October 2022, after several US lawmakers warned US financial executives to not attend the Global Financial Leaders' Investment Summit, Zeman said that "Hong Kong is nothing like what they talked about" and "It just shows how uninformed they are." Zeman also said that Paul Chan, who tested positive for COVID-19 before the Summit, should be granted an exemption by the government to allow him to escape restrictions and attend the Summit, saying "That's the whole point of the financial conference, which is really to show to the world that the city is really opening up."

In November 2022, Zeman said that there was no point to push for dropping of all COVID-19 restrictions, and said that "There is no point in continuing to talk about '0+0'. It’s more important to have targeted measures to make people's lives better." A month later in December 2022, Zeman said that COVID-19 restrictions should be loosened, "I'm hoping that the government will really understand now that China has changed, it's time for Hong Kong to follow. Because the Chinese government is now sending a message to all citizens that Covid-19 is not so serious now." On 22 December 2022, after some restrictions were dropped, Zeman said it was "best Christmas present for everybody."

In February 2023, after tensions rose between the US consul general and the government, Zeman said "This US consul has made some bold statements, forcing the Chinese government to respond and protect itself."

== Official positions ==
Zeman is a prominent figure in government circles, holding various positions on committees, boards, and advisory bodies. He has been a long-standing member of the Board of Governors of both the Canadian Chamber of Commerce and the Hong Kong General Chamber of Commerce. Additionally, he is a member of the Economic and Employment Council in Hong Kong. Furthermore, he serves as a board member of the Tourism Strategy Group for the Hong Kong Tourism Commission, the Cultural and Heritage Commission, and the Urban Renewal Authority. He is a member of the International Events Fund Steering Committee for the Hong Kong Tourism Board. He was appointed to the Services Promotion Strategy Group, chaired by the Financial Secretary. He is also a member of the Board of the Hong Kong Arts Festival and the Hong Kong Community Chest.

== Citizenship ==
Zeman has long held the right of abode in Hong Kong; this entitled him to a Hong Kong permanent identity card. In addition, in September 2008, Zeman renounced his Canadian citizenship and became a naturalised citizen of the People's Republic of China, as he said he has lived and worked in Hong Kong for 38 years and has always considered it to be his home. The Chinese citizenship, combined with his right of abode in Hong Kong, enables him to hold a Home Return Permit for entering mainland China, and a Hong Kong Special Administrative Region passport for international travel.

Order of precedence
Preceded by Victor Fung; Recipient of the Grand Bauhinia Medal	Hong Kong order of precedence Recipient of the Grand Bauhinia Medal	Succeeded by Geoffrey Ma; Recipient of the Grand Bauhinia Medal
