= Chan Yuet-ming =

Hong Kong politician

The Honourable Chan Yuet-ming MH
- 陳月明
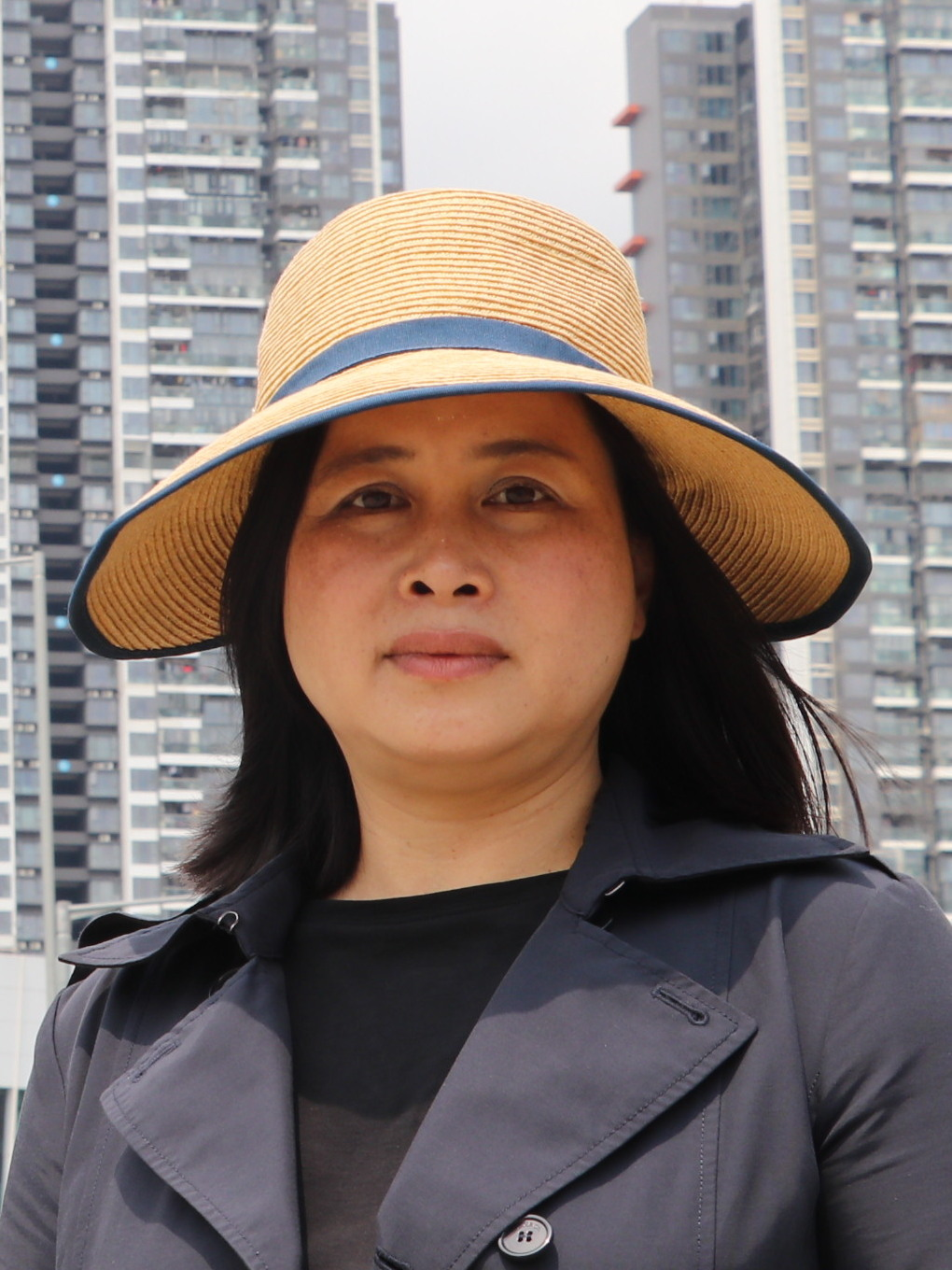
- Chan in 2023

Member of the Legislative Council
- In office 1 January 2022 – 31 December 2025
- Preceded by: New constituency
- Constituency: Election Committee

Personal details
- Born: 1972 (age 53–54) Hong Kong
- Spouse: Zhang Lei (m. 2006)
- Parent: Chan Kam-wah
- Education: Manchester Metropolitan University; European University

Chan Yuet-ming, MH (Chinese: 陳月明; born 1972) is a Hong Kong politician. She was a member of the Legislative Council of Hong Kong for Election Committee constituency and is an ex-officio member of the North District Council as chairwoman of the Ta Kwu Ling Rural Committee.

== Biography ==
Chan was born into the indigenous family in Ta Kwu Ling, New Territories. Her father Chan Kam-wah was a village leader and her brother Frankie Chan Shung-fai was the chairman of the Ta Kwu Ling Rural Committee until she replaced him in the 2019 Hong Kong Rural Representative election, after her father gave way to her to become the first Rural Committee chairwoman in Hong Kong's history.

Chan was graduated from the Manchester Metropolitan University with a bachelor's degree in Hospitality Business Management and obtained a Master of Business Management from European University.

Chan became the chairwoman of the Ta Kwu Ling Rural Committee and therefore an ex-officio member of the North District Council. She was also appointed member of the Advisory Committee on the Northern Metropolis in 2023.

She was elected through the Election Committee constituency in the 2021 Legislative Council election, and stood down in 2025.

Political offices
| Previous: Frankie Chan | Chairman of Ta Kwu Ling Rural Committee; 2019–present | Incumbent |
| Previous: Frankie Chan | Member of North District Council; Ex-officio: Ta Kwu Ling Rural Committee Chairman; 2019–present | Incumbent |
Legislative Council of Hong Kong
| New constituency | Member of Legislative Council; Representative for Election Committee; 2022–2025 | |
