= Tang Fei (Hong Kong) =

The Honourable Lawrence Tang Fei MH
- 鄧飛
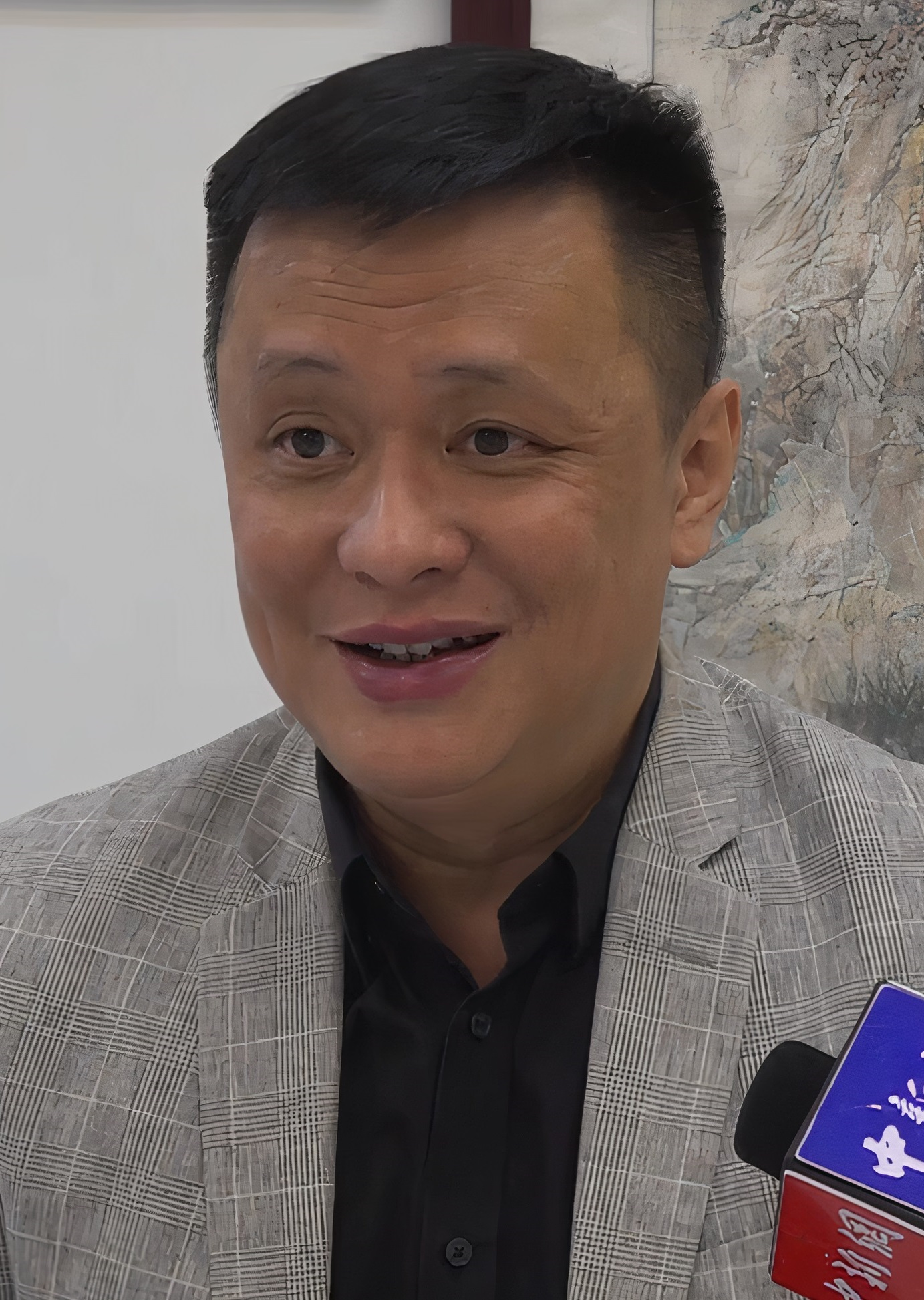
- Tang in 2021

Member of the Legislative Council
- Incumbent
- Assumed office 1 January 2022
- Preceded by: New constituency
- Constituency: Election Committee

Personal details
- Party: Hong Kong Federation of Education Workers (FEW)
- Education: Chinese University of Hong Kong
- Occupation: Politician; educator

Lawrence Tang Fei MH (Chinese: 鄧飛) is a Hong Kong politician and educator. He was a member of the Legislative Council of Hong Kong for Election Committee constituency between 2021 and 2025. He is a current member of the Legislative Council for education constituency since 2026. He is also a former chairman of the Hong Kong Federation of Education Workers (FEW) and former principal of the Heung To Secondary School (Tseung Kwan O).

== Biography ==
Tang graduated from the Department of Government and Public Administration at the Chinese University of Hong Kong.

He was appointed to the Education Commission in 2011 and the Committee on the Promotion of Civic Education in 2014. He was appointed to the Committee on the Initiation of Moral and National Education Subject, which the subject later triggered a large-scale protest movement.

He ran in Election Committee constituency in the 2021 Legislative Council election, in which he received 1,339 votes and gained the second seat in the constituency.

In 2022, Tang defended a school rule where boys were not allowed to have long hair, saying that it would go against traditional values.

In 2025, he was re-elected as a legislative councilor through education constituency.

== Notes ==
Legislative Council of Hong Kong
| New constituency | Member of Legislative Council; Representative for Election Committee; 2022–present | Incumbent |
