= So Cheung-wing =

Hong Kong politician

Dr The Honourable So Cheung-wing SBS, JP
- 蘇長榮
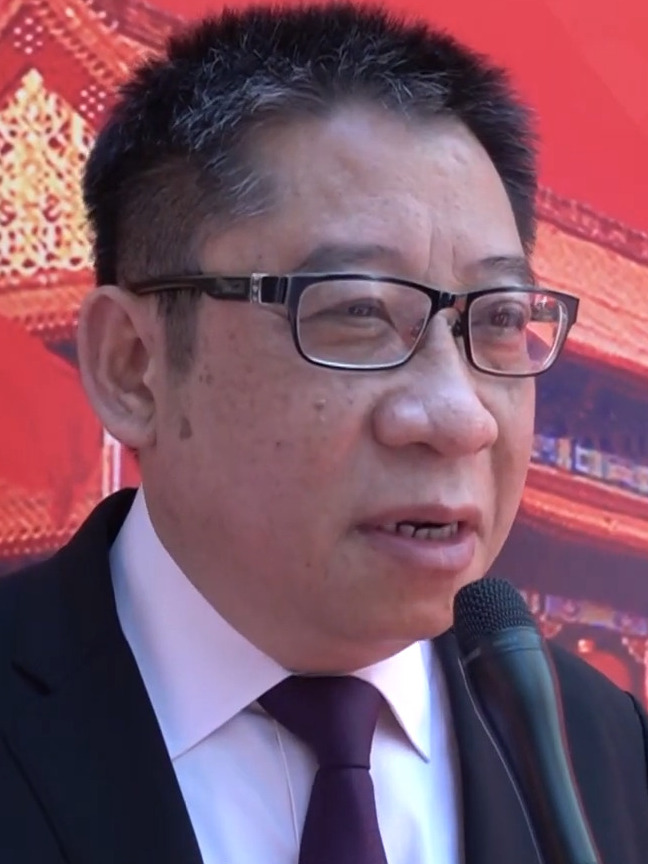

Member of the Legislative Council
- In office 1 January 2022 – 31 December 2025
- Preceded by: New constituency
- Constituency: Election Committee

Personal details
- Born: 1960 (age 65–66) Foshan, Guangdong, China

So Cheung-wing, SBS, JP (Chinese: 蘇長榮) (born 1960) is a Hong Kong businessman and politician. He is a former member of the Legislative Council of Hong Kong for Election Committee constituency between 2022 and 2025 and Hong Kong member of the National Committee of the Chinese People's Political Consultative Conference (CPPCC).

So was elected through the Election Committee constituency in the 2021 Legislative Council election, with 1,013 votes. He was best known for missing the second reading vote of the Safeguarding National Security Bill in 2024 after apparently falling asleep. He was also one of the most inactive legislators throughout his term in office. So stood down in 2025.
