= Chow Man-kong =

Hong Kong economist and politician

The Honourable Chow Man-kong
- 周文港
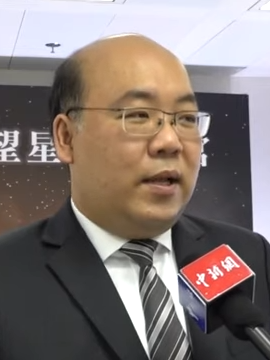
- Chow in 2021

Member of the Legislative Council
- In office 1 January 2022 – 31 December 2025
- Preceded by: Constituency created
- Constituency: Election Committee

Personal details
- Born: 1981 (age 44–45) British Hong Kong
- Citizenship: Hong Kong
- Education: University of Hong Kong (PhD); Hong Kong Baptist University (BA)
- Occupation: Economist

Chow Man-kong is a Hong Kong economist and politician, and a former member of Legislative Council, representing the Election Committee constituency.

== Biography ==
Born in colonial Hong Kong, Chow had held positions in pro-Beijing organisations. Chow was the special advisor to the Central Policy Unit of the Hong Kong Government and a member of the Hebei provincial committee of Chinese People's Political Consultative Conference. He ran in the 2021 Legislative Council election and was elected through the Election Committee constituency.

On 5 January 2022, Carrie Lam announced new warnings and restrictions against social gathering due to potential COVID-19 outbreaks. One day later, it was discovered that Chow attended a birthday party hosted by Witman Hung Wai-man, with 222 guests. At least one guest tested positive with COVID-19, causing many guests to be quarantined. Chow was not forced to quarantine. Chow claimed that he stayed for no more than 20 minutes, leaving before 7 PM, and he used the "LeaveHomeSafe" app as required, presented his vaccination card, and did not remove his mask while at the venue. He expressed deep regret and promised to reflect seriously. His nucleic acid test result was negative, and he committed to strictly following government requirements and diligently improving his pandemic prevention measures in the future.

On 22 February 2022, Chow Man-kong, together with other Legislative Council Members, proposed strategy to the HKSAR government that "civil servants mobilize in districts to fight the epidemic". 3 weeks later, the government arranged civil service team to deliver basic necessities and food to Hong Kong people.

On 17 March 2022, Chow organized a group to visits to the Firefighting "Isolation Hotline Center" and gifts of rapid test kits, stew and other supplies, he emphasized that they are one of the most crucial forces in Hong Kong's fight against COVID-19, and urged the Fire Services Department to meet expectations by speeding up quarantine arrangements, maintaining facility quality, ensuring citizen safety, and contributing to Hong Kong's victory over the pandemic.

On 31 March 2022, by Chow's active fundraising effort, Want Want Holdings Limited donated disinfection and anti-epidemic materials worth a total of HKD$1 million to the Federation of Hong Kong Island Federations through Chow, in order to fight the Covid-19.

On 14 April 2022, Chow together with the Hong Kong Higher Education Council and the Internet Professionals Association, prepared a batch of cheering packs for free to give to DSE candidates to cheer everyone up, aimed to help poor students to get back to school for studying and preparing for the DSE public examination.

In September 2022, Chow returned to the Councilor's Office in CITIC Building on September 24, Chow tested positive for COVID-19. He quarantined at home, and his office staff were performed all negative result in Rapid tests.

Legislative Council of Hong Kong
New constituency	Member of Legislative Council; Representative for Election Committee; 2022–2025	Succeeded by
