= Wendy Hong =

Hong Kong politician (born 1975)

- 洪雯
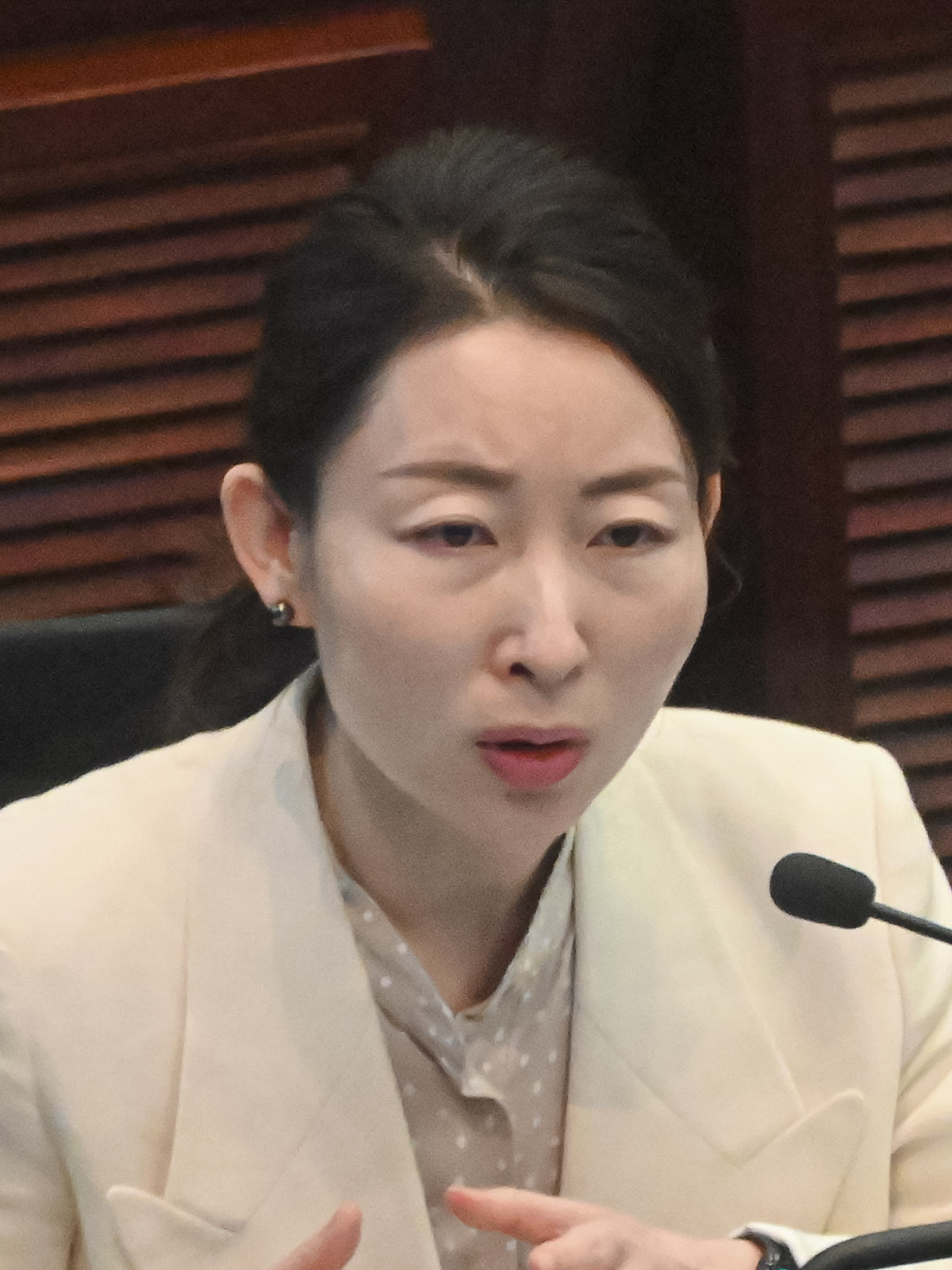
- Hong in 2023

Member of the Legislative Council
- In office 1 January 2022 – 31 December 2025
- Constituency: Election Committee

Personal details
- Born: 1975 (age 50–51) Anshun, Guizhou, China
- Citizenship: China (Hong Kong)
- Education: Tongji University; University of Hong Kong

Wendy Hong Wen (Chinese: 洪雯; born in 1975) is a Hong Kong politician who was a Legislative Council member for the Election Committee constituency. In addition to public office, she is serving as head of research at the New World Development Company Limited.

In 2021, a law was enacted where lawmakers had to be "patriots" and loyal to the government. Later in January 2022, after gaining a seat in the "patriots"-only election, Hong inferred that previous anti-establishment legislative council members were responsible for dysfunction in Hong Kong, claiming "We couldn't focus on development for a long time because our society and the chamber were highly divided, and the Legislative Council was not able to function smoothly."

On 5 January 2022, Carrie Lam announced new warnings and restrictions against social gathering due to potential COVID-19 outbreaks. One day later, it was discovered that Hong attended a birthday party hosted by Witman Hung Wai-man, with 222 guests. At least one guest tested positive with COVID-19, causing all guests to be quarantined. In September 2022, Hong tested positive for COVID-19.

Hong chose not to seek re-election in 2025.
