= Chan Pui-leung =

The Honourable Chan Pui-leung
- 陳沛良
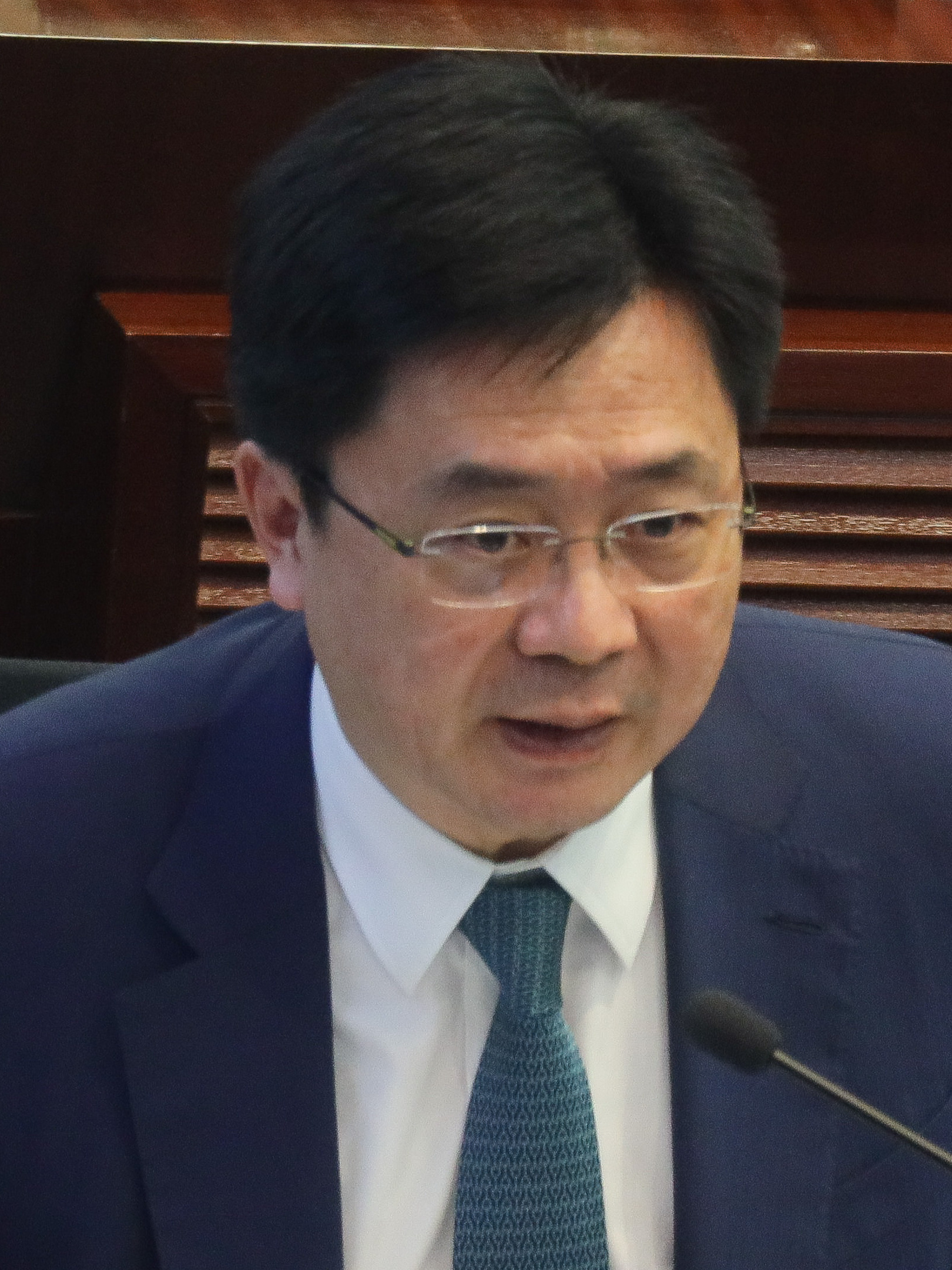
- Chan in 2023

Member of the Legislative Council
- Incumbent
- Assumed office 1 January 2026
- Preceded by: Chan Kin-por
- Constituency: Insurance
- In office 1 January 2022 – 31 December 2025
- Preceded by: New constituency
- Constituency: Election Committee

Personal details
- Born: 1959 (age 66–67) Hong Kong
- Party: Independent
- Children: 1
- Education: University of Hong Kong (MBA)

Chan Pui-leung (Chinese: 陳沛良; born 1959) is a Hong Kong insurer and politician. He is a member of the Legislative Council of Hong Kong for Election Committee constituency from 2022 to 2025 and for Insurance constituency since 2026.

== Biography ==
Chan was graduated from the local leftist Heung To Middle School in 1976 and the University of Hong Kong with a Master of Business Administration and is a member of the Chartered Institute of Marketing (MCIM). He is a general manager of the China Taiping Insurance (HK) Company Limited.

Chan first elected to the Election Committee in 2016 through the Insurance subsector. He was elected as Legislative Councilor through the Election Committee constituency in the 2021 Legislative Council election.

On 5 January 2022, Carrie Lam announced new warnings and restrictions against social gathering due to potential COVID-19 outbreaks. One day later, it was discovered that Chan attended a birthday party hosted by Witman Hung Wai-man, with 222 guests. At least one guest tested positive with COVID-19, causing many guests to be quarantined.

He was re-elected through Insurance constituency in 2025.

== Personal life ==
Chan is married and has a daughter with his wife.

Legislative Council of Hong Kong
Preceded by Chan Kin-por	Member of Legislative Council; Representative for Insurance; 2026–present	Incumbent
New constituency	Member of Legislative Council; Representative for Election Committee; 2022–2025	Succeeded by
