= New People's Party =

New People's Party 新民黨
- Chairperson: Regina Ip
- Executive Vice Chairman: Lai Tung-kwok
- Deputy Chairpersons: Pun Kwok-shan; Eunice Yung; Johnny Hon
- Founded: 9 January 2011; 15 years ago
- Headquarters: Flats D-F, 11/F China; Overseas Building, 139 Hennessy; Road, Wan Chai, Hong Kong
- Youth wing: New People's Party; Youth Committee
- Membership (2019): ▲850
- Ideology: Conservatism (HK); Chinese nationalism National conservatism
- Regional affiliation: Pro-Beijing camp
- Colours: Blue and red
- Slogan: "The Party that Makes a Difference"
- Executive Council: 1 / 33
- Legislative Council: 3 / 90
- District Councils: 25 / 470
- NPC (HK deputies): 0 / 36
- CPPCC (HK members): 1 / 124

Website
- npp.org.hk

New People's Party
- Traditional Chinese: 新民黨
- Simplified Chinese: 新民党
Transcriptions
Standard Mandarin
- Hanyu Pinyin: Xīnmín dǎng
Yue: Cantonese
- Yale Romanization: Sān màhn dóng
- Jyutping: San^{1} man^{4} dong^{2}

The New People's Party (NPP) is a political party in Hong Kong. Chaired by former senior government official Regina Ip, it is currently the sixth largest party in the Legislative Council. Established by Ip in 2011, the party aims at broadening the middle class and civil servant portion of the pro-Beijing camp.

Since Ip has strongly indicated her interest in becoming Chief Executive and has run in 2012 and 2017 respectively, it has been suggested that the party is primarily a vehicle for that goal. The party won two seats in the 2012 Legislative Council election, with Ip re-elected in Hong Kong Island and vice chairman Michael Tien gained a seat in New Territories West. The NPP expanded its grassroots network by forming an alliance with regional political group Civil Force in Shatin in 2014. With the groundwork of the Civil Force, the party gained an additional seat in New Territories East in 2016.

As the NPP became closer with the Beijing authorities, Tien split from the party with six other District Councillors in 2017. Being the vocal supporter of the SAR administration, the NPP received a devastating defeat in the 2019 District Council election amid the widespread anti-government protests in 2019, with all of its 28 candidates being defeated and all of its 13 District Councillors being unseated.

== Party beliefs ==
The party positions itself with the pro-Beijing camp. Ip has said that it targets the "middle-class", rather than the "grass-roots". Its electorate base also largely comes from the civil servants, especially retired officials from the disciplined services, due to Ip's background. The party's stated platform includes universal suffrage, economic diversification and the reduction in the wealth gap.

== History ==
=== Early years ===
The leading figure of the New People's Party is Regina Ip, who was the then Secretary for Security and the incumbent member of the Legislative Council, as well as the chair of the think tank Savantas Policy Institute. She founded the New People's Party on 9 January 2011. Michael Tien, former vice chairman of the Liberal Party and younger brother of former Liberal Party chair James Tien and Louis Shih were the founding Deputy Chairmen however they both later left the party.

The party intended to field ten candidates in the district council elections in November 2011. Candidates would include three former senior security service officers in Tony Liu Kit-ming, the soon-to-retire chairman of the Hong Kong Police Inspectors Association; Wat Ki-on, the retired former chairman of the Fire Services Department Ambulancemen's Union; and Tsui Chi-keung, the retired former chairman of the Fire Services Department Staff's General Association. It won four seats in total as a result.

Ip announced her interest in running for the Chief Executive in the 2012 election, but failed to secure enough nominations to enter the race. She then endorsed Leung Chun-ying, winner of the election. In September, both chair Regina Ip and deputy chair Michael Tien were elected to the Legislative Council in the LegCo elections. Regina Ip was subsequently appointed by Leung Chun-ying to the Executive Council in October 2012.

=== Alliance with Civil Force ===
The party expanded the network in the New Territories East by forming a political alliance with the Civil Force in Shatin in February 2014. Civil Force leader Pun Kwok-shan was appointed Vice-Chairman of the New People's Party. With 17 Civil Force District Councillors and 2 independents joined the New People's Party, the party's seat in the District Councils jumped from 12 to 31.

In the 2015 District Council election, the New People's Party and Civil Force won 25 seats, while its seats in Tai Hang and Tai Koo Shing East in Hong Kong Island where Ip's base was taken by pro-democrats. Civil Force's base in Sha Tin was also lost to the pro-democrats with five veterans defeated by new faces.

The New People's Party scored a victory in the 2016 Legislative Council election by taking three seats in the geographical constituencies and doubled their vote share from 3.76 to 7.73 per cent. Incumbents Regina Ip and Michael Tien both received large vote share in Hong Kong Island and the New Territories West respectively with new face Eunice Yung first elected in the New Territories East despite the allegation of her being backed by the Liaison Office.

=== 2017 Chief Executive election and Michael Tien departure ===
In December 2016, the party endorsed Ip's second bid in the 2017 Chief Executive election. Due to the lobbying by the Liaison Office for former Chief Secretary Carrie Lam and pro-democrats' aim to send former Financial Secretary John Tsang and retired judge Woo Kwok-hing into the race, Ip was squeezed out from canvassing a minimum number of 150 nominations in the 1,194-member Election Committee to enter the race for the second time. After the election, Ip said that the party may reposition itself to become less pro-establishment.

Michael Tien, the party deputy chairman, complained the election had "lost its shape" due to the increasing interference of "an invisible hand", referring to the Liaison Office. Tien indicated his support for John Tsang, although Ip endorsed Carrie Lam on the last day before the election. Tien eventually quit the party on 10 April with six District Councillors, citing the party's overly close tie with Beijing was one of the reasons of his departure. The numbers of Legislative Council seats dropped to two and District Councils to 19 as a result.

The party nominated Southern District Councillor Judy Chan to represent in the 2018 Legislative Council Hong Kong Island by-election running against independent democrat Au Nok-hin for the seat left vacant by the oath-taking controversy which resulted in the disqualification of six legislators. The party combined forces with the Democratic Alliance for the Betterment and Progress of Hong Kong (DAB) and the Hong Kong Federation of Trade Unions (FTU) to form a united front against the pro-democrats. As a result, Chan was narrowly defeated in the election by only three per cent of margin by receiving more than 127,000 votes.

A staunch supporter of the government amid the massive protests against the extradition bill, the party saw a massive departure of its members, many of which were District Councillors. The number of District Councillors dropped from 25 in the 2015 elections to 13 only. In the 2019 District Council election, the party suffered a devastating defeat by losing all its 13 seats in the District Councils and failing to get any candidate elected in the landslide victory of the pro-democracy camp.

=== Current years ===
In February 2021, after Xia Baolong called for only "patriots" to be part of the Hong Kong government, the NPP voiced full support and claimed that "The Legislative Council and the District Council, occupied by people who oppose the country's sovereignty and endanger national security... distorted Hong Kong's political system."

2025 Legislative Council election, Regina Ip announced that she would not run in the elections. The party fielded 8 candidates with 3 being elected, making it the fifth largest party in the Legislative Council at that time however the FEW surpassed them after 2 candidates declared their affiliation with FEW post-candidacy, making the NPP the sixth largest party.

== Performance in elections ==
=== Chief Executive elections ===
Election	Candidate	No. of votes	% of votes
2012	Regina Ip	Not nominated	
2017	Regina Ip	Not nominated	

=== Legislative Council elections ===
Election	Number of popular votes	% of popular votes	GC seats	FC seats	EC seats	Total seats	+/−	Position
2012	68,097	3.76	2	0		2 / 70	1▲	9th▲
2016	167,589▲	7.73▲	3	0		3 / 70	1▲	7th▲
2021	150,118▼	11.35▲	2	0	3	5 / 90	2▲	4th▲
2025	147,113▼	11.52▲	2	0	1	3 / 90	2▼	5th▼

=== District Council elections ===
Election	Number of popular votes	% of popular votes	D.E. seats	E.C. seats	App. seats	Total seats	+/−
2011	15,568	1.32	4		1	4 / 412	4▲
2015	75,793▲	5.24▲	26			26 / 431	22▲
2019	79,975▲	2.73▼	0			0 / 452	26▼
2023	99,775▲	8.52▲	5	10	10	25 / 470	25▲

== Representatives ==
=== Executive Council ===
- Regina Ip

=== Legislative Council ===
Constituency	Member
Hong Kong Island West	Judy Chan Kapui
New Territories North East	Dominic Lee
Election Committee	Adrian Ho

=== District Councils ===
The party holds 25 seats in eight District Councils (2024–2027):

District	Constituency	Members
Wan Chai	District Committees	Joey Lee Man-lung
Eastern	District Committees	Dana Lau Shing-she
Eastern	Appointed	Anthony Lu Xiaofeng
Eastern	Appointed	Calvin Kwok Ho-king
Southern	District Committees	Nicole Wong Yu-ching
Southern	Appointed	Vera Ho Yuen-wei
Tsuen Wan	Appointed	Marcella Cheung Man-ka
Tuen Mun	Tuen Mun North	So Ka-man
Tuen Mun	District Committees	Kam Man-fung
Tuen Mun	District Committees	Victor Kwong Man-tik
Tai Po	District Committees	Kitty Chan Kin-wan
Sai Kung	Tseung Kwan O North	Victor Chan Chi-ho
Sai Kung	District Committees	Ken Chan Kin-chun
Sai Kung	District Committees	Tam Chuk-kwan
Sha Tin	Sha Tin East	Yiu Ka-chun
Sha Tin	Sha Tin South	Eddie Lam Yiu-shing
Sha Tin	Sha Tin North	Anna Law Yi-lam
Sha Tin	District Committees	Leung Ka-wai
Sha Tin	District Committees	Cheung Pak-yuen
Sha Tin	District Committees	Ha Kim-kwan
Sha Tin	Appointed	Vincent Wong Wai-shin
Sha Tin	Appointed	Leung Ka-fai
Sha Tin	Appointed	Chan Man-kuen
Sha Tin	Appointed	Michael Lau Tsz-chung
Sha Tin	Appointed	Pun Kwok-shan
