= List of members of the Election Committee of Hong Kong, 2017–21 =

This is the list of members of the Election Committee elected in the 2016 Election Committee subsector elections. It serves from 2017 to 2021 and is responsible for electing the Chief Executive of Hong Kong in the 2017 election. By March 2017, there is a total number of 1,194 members in the 1,200-strong Election Committee, in which one is vacated in the Import and Export subsector and two vacated in the Legislative Council due to the disqualification of two Legislative Council members, as well as three overlapped memberships of Martin Liao, Ma Fung-kwok and Michael Tien who are both Legislative Council members and Hong Kong deputies of the National People's Congress.

The tag behind each member indicates the candidate each member nominates in the 2017 election: Lam Carrie Lam; Tsang John Tsang; Woo Woo Kwok-hing.

== First Sector ==
=== Catering ===
- Chan Wing-on Lam
- Cheung Loy-chun Lam
- Cheung Wai-ping Lam
- Chong Yam-ming Lam
- Andy Fung Chung-kai Lam
- Lee Yuen-hong Lam
- Lo Ho-wan Lam
- Tam Siu-sing Lam
- Simon Wong Kit-lung Lam
- Tang Kam-fai Lam
- Wong Wing-chee Lam
- Woo Chu Lam
- Yau Kam-wing Lam
- Yeung Koon-yat Lam
- Yeung Wai Lam
- Yeung Wai-sing Lam
- Allan Zeman Lam

=== Commercial (First) ===
- Joseph Chan Ho-lim (Liberal)
- Oscar Chow Vee-tsung Lam
- Manohar Thakurdas Chugh Lam
- Martin Cubbon
- Allen Fugn Yuk-lun Lam
- Aron Hari Harilela Lam
- Stanley Hui Hon-chung Lam
- George Leung Siu-kay
- David Lie-A-Cheong Tai-chong (BPA)
- Stephen Ng Tin-hoi Lam
- Pang Yiu-kai Lam
- Leland Sun Li-husn Lam
- James Tien Pei-chun (Liberal) Tsang
- Susan Woo Mo-fong
- Emil Yu Chen-on Lam
- Yu Pang-chun Lam
- Edmond Yue Kwok-yin Lam
- Betty Yuen So Siu-mai Lam

=== Commercial (Second) ===
- David Chan Pun Lam
- Ian Chan Yau-nam Lam
- Jonathan Choi Koon-shum Lam
- Chong Hok-shan Lam
- Chow Kuen-kuen Lam
- David Fong Man-hung Lam
- Lam Kwong-yu Lam
- Lam Ming-sum Lam
- Lau Yue-sun Lam
- Lee Tak-lun Lam
- Lawrence Ma Chung-lai Lam
- Ng Chu Lien-fan Lam
- Ricky Tsang Chi-ming Lam
- Wong Sau-ching Lam
- Wong Wai-ching Lam
- Yeung Chun-kam Lam
- Yu Kwok-chun Lam
- Johnny Yu Wah-yung Lam

=== Employers' Federation of Hong Kong ===
- Duncan Arthur William Abate Lam
- Alexander Anthony Arena
- John Chan Cho-chak
- Chan Siu-hung Lam
- Kwong Ching-wai Lam
- Wilson Kwong Wing-tsuen Lam
- Richard Li Tzar-kai
- Mak Kin-wah
- Ng chi-ming
- Louis Pong Wai-yan
- John Robert Slosar
- Patrick Tsang On-yip Lam
- Tsui Yiu-cheung Lam
- Wong Chik-wing Lam
- Wong Kwong-yiu Lam
- Robert Wong Yau-chung Lam

=== Finance ===
- Chan Fung-cheung Lam
- Cheng Chung-ngam Lam
- Chu Tan-fan Lam
- Fu Kim Lam
- Edmond Ip Tak-chuen Lam
- Margaret Ko Lam
- David Kwok Sek-chi Lam
- Leo Kung Lin-cheng Lam
- Rose Lee Wai-mun
- Adrian David Li Man-kiu Lam
- Lo Chi-wai
- Ma Ching-yuk Lam
- Ma Chan-chi Lam
- Stephen Tan Lam
- Tse Siu-ling Lam
- Derek Wong Hon-hing Lam
- Peter Wong Tung-shun
- Ann Yeung Yun-chi Lam

=== Financial Services ===
- Henry Chan Lam
- Gary Cheung Wai-kwok Lam
- Haywood Cheung Lam
- Ricky Chim Kim-lun Tsang
- Jojo Choy Sze-chung Lam
- Chu Yuet-wah Lam
- Brian Fung Wei-lung Lam
- Jeanie Lee Sai-yin Lam
- Lee Jor-hung Lam
- Kenny Lee Yiu-sun Lam
- Robert Lee Wai-wang Lam
- Vincent Marshall Lee Kwan-ho Lam
- Kenny Tang Sing-hing Lam
- Tse Yung-hoi Lam
- Tsui Luen-on Tsang
- Daisy Yeung Lam
- Yim Fung Lam
- Yue Wai-keung Lam

=== Hong Kong Chinese Enterprises Association ===
- Chan Sai-ming
- Fung Tak-lee Lam
- Carmen Kan Wai-mun
- William Kwok Wing-cheung
- Lam King Lam
- Lau Sung
- Li Ngai-lap
- Li Wai-keung
- Lo Ping-wa
- San Chung-kam
- So Hiu-pang
- Wong For-yam
- Xie Bin
- Yau Wai-kwong
- Yiu Loi-man
- Eric Zhu Liwei

=== Hotel ===
- Keven Chan Tin-yau Lam
- Victor Chan Kok-wai
- Cheng Chi-man Lam
- Winnie Chiu Wing-kwan Lam
- Raymond Chow Wai-kam
- Gobind Naroomal Gary Harilela Lam
- Kuok Hui-kwong Lam
- Doreen Lee Yuk-fong Lam
- Lee Ka-shing Lam
- Alexander Lo Chun-him Lam
- Lo Yuk-sui Lam
- Lui Che-woo Lam
- Paddy Lui Wai-yu Lam
- Ng Kam-hung Lam
- Daryl Ng Win-kong Lam
- Thomas Jefferson Wu Tsang
- Belinda Yeung Bik-yiu Lam

=== Import and Export ===
- Chan King-hang Lam
- Cheng Kai-ming
- Charles Cheung Hok-sau Lam
- Chong Shing-hum Lam
- Michael Hui Wah-kit (DAB) Lam
- Lam Lung-on Lam
- Joseph Lee Lam
- Leung Lun
- Willy Lin Sun-mo
- Pang Chor-fu
- Peter Poon Lam
- Ivan Ting Tien-li Lam
- Wan Hang-ping
- Jimmy Wong Chi-ho Lam
- Kennedy Wong Ying-ho Lam
- Sally Yeung Ching
- Yiu Chi-shing Lam

=== Industrial (First) ===
- Chan Chun-tung
- Paul Chan Kam-ching Lam
- Chen Cheung-jen Lam
- Daniel Cheng Man-chung Lam
- Steve Chuang Tzu-hsiung Lam
- David Ho Chi-shing Lam
- Kwok Chun-wah (BPA) Lam
- Victor Lo Chung-wing Lam
- So Wing-keung Lam
- Cliff Sun Kai-lit (Liberal) Lam
- Tam Wai-ho Lam
- Bernie Ting Wai-cheung Lam
- Kenneth Ting Woo-shou (Liberal) Lam
- John Tong Shing-hing Lam
- Yeung Chung-kit Lam
- Eric Yim Chi-ming Lam
- Yip Chung-yin Lam
- Zhang Hwo Jie Lam

=== Industrial (Second) ===
- Shirley Chan Suk-ling Lam
- Chan Wing-kee Lam
- Martin Hsu Tsun-fai Lam
- Joseph Lau Man-wai Lam
- Eddy Li Sau-hung Lam
- Lo Kam-wing Lam
- Ng Ching-wun Lam
- Dennis Ng Wang-pun Lam
- Shi Lop-tak
- Shum Wan-lung
- Irons Sze (DAB) Lam
- Tony Tai Chak-leung Lam
- Tang To
- Tsui Ping-kwong Lam
- Simon Wong Ka-wo Lam
- Yeung Chi-hung Lam
- Michael Yu Lee-ming Lam
- Yu Sun-say (DAB) Lam

=== Insurance ===
- Chan Pui-leung Lam
- Chan Yim-kwong Lam
- Cheng Kwok-ping Lam
- Choy Chung-foo Lam
- John Chu Tai-wo Lam
- Chu Wing-yiu Lam
- Eric Hui Kam-kwai
- Agnes Koon Woo Kam-oi Lam
- Sidney Ku Shun-kit
- Sammy Lau Siu-mun
- Terry Lo Kin-wing Lam
- Ronnie Ng Wing-fat Lam
- Jimmy Poon Wing-fai
- Wilson Tang Chee-ping
- Andrew Wong Kwa-chuen Lam
- Wan Chi-tak Lam
- Wong Kok-ho Lam
- Yuen Shui-fan

=== Real Estate and Construction ===
- Allan Chan Sau-kit Lam
- Ronnie Chan Lam
- Cheng Chi-kong Lam
- Daisy Ho Chiu-fung Lam
- Hung Cheung-shew Lam
- Keith Graham Kerr
- Adam Kwok Kai-fai Lam
- Eddie Lam Kin-wing Lam
- Lee Shau-kee Lam
- Leung Chi-kin Lam
- Joseph Leung Wing-kong Lam
- Li Ka-shing
- Lo Ka-shui Lam
- Ng Chee-siong Lam
- Rocky Poon Lock-kee Lam
- Sin Wing-ning Lam
- Douglas Woo Chun-kuen Lam
- Gordon Wu Ying-sheung Lam

=== Textiles and Garment ===
- Chan Oi-ching Lam
- Cyrus Chang Yan-yiu Lam
- Chen Tong-sang Tsang
- Katherine Fang Suk-kwan Lam
- Fung Wai-yiu Lam
- Stanford Kuo Dah-chih Lam
- Harry Lee Nai-shee
- Lawrence Leung Ka-yuen Lam
- Lo Mo-ching Lam
- Evelyn Lu Lam
- Shiu King-wah Lam
- Henry Sun Shiu-tsang
- Stanley Szeto Chi-yan Lam
- Henry Tan Lam
- Sunny Tan Lam
- Kenneth Wong Kai-chi Lam
- Yeung Chun-fan Lam
- Banny Yu Yuen-mau Tsang

=== Tourism ===
- Chan Lup-chi Lam
- Arnold Cheng Ka-kui
- Ronnie Ho Pak-ting Tsang
- Lee Chun-ting Lam
- Andrew Leung Chi-kwan
- Leung Yiu-lam Lam
- Lo Wing-sze Lam
- Ma Yuk-man Lam
- Ng Hi-on Lam
- Ng Kwong-wai Lam
- Jason Shum Jiu-sang Tsang
- Tommy Tam Kwong-shun Lam
- James Tong Wai-pong Lam
- Warren Tong Lun-wa
- Gianna Wong mei-kiu Lam
- Wong Chun-tat Lam
- Wong See-sum
- Freddy Yip Hing-ning

=== Transport ===
- Chan Kwok-sing
- Cheng Hak-wo
- Samuel Cheng Wai-po Lam
- Ferdinad Fong Chi-fai
- Kevin Hui Chung-ying Lam
- Hai Chi-yuet
- Sunny Ho Lap-kee
- Lai Wing-ming
- Colin Lam Ko-yin Lam
- Lee Luen-fai Lam
- Matthe Lee Chak-cheong Lam
- Leung Tak-hing Lam
- Li Pok-yan (DAB)
- Li Tak-sum
- Ling Chi-keung Lam
- Szeto Ka-sing
- Matthew Wong Leung-pak Lam
- Yau Wing-wah

=== Wholesale and Retail ===
- Chao Chen-kuo (NPP)
- Cheng Wai-hung Lam
- Cheung Chi-cheung Lam
- Cheung Ho-ming (DAB) Lam
- Selina Chow Liang Shuk-yee (Liberal) Tsang
- Vincent Fang Kang (Liberal) Lam
- Bankee Kwan Pak-hoo Lam
- Simon Kwok Siu-ming (Liberal) Lam
- Thomas Lau Luen-hung Lam
- Leung Yat-cheong (Liberal) Lam
- Tommy Li Ying-sang Lam
- LI Sheng-chi Lam
- Li Tze-leung (Liberal) Lam
- Ma King-huen Lam
- Ma Yung-yi Lam
- Sun Tai-lun Lam
- Esther Wong Lai-sheung Lam
- Kenlay Wong Kong-hui Lam

== Second Sector ==
=== Accountancy ===
- Chan Kan-tik Woo
- Raymond Cheng Chung-ching (ABC.P.A)
- Cheng Ho-long (Dem. A. Accountants) Tsang
- Cheung Chun-pong (Dem. A. Accountants) Tsang
- Benjamin Choi Chi-kwong (DA Account.) Tsang
- Choy Kai-sing (Dem. A. Accountants/Civic) Tsang
- Fan Pao-kee (Dem. A. Accountants) Tsang
- Fung Ling-yip (Dem. A. Accountants) Tsang
- Elina Hung See-mei (Dem. A. Accountants) Tsang
- Ho Chun-hung (H. of Account.; quit)
- Hui Chi-chuen (Dem. A. Accountants) Tsang
- Ronald Kung Yiu-fai (ABC.P.A) Tsang
- Kwan Tsz-him (Dem. A. Accountants) Tsang
- Lau Yuen-ming (Dem. A. Accountants) Tsang
- Lee Suk-yee (Dem. A. Accountants) Tsang
- Leung Man-chun (Dem. A. Accountants) Tsang
- Leung Man-kit (Dem. A. Accountants) Tsang
- Li Kin-hang (Dem. A. Accountants) Tsang
- Nelson Miu Liong (Dem. A. Accountants) Tsang
- Ng Kit-yee (Dem. A. Accountants) Tsang
- Po Kam-man (Dem. A. Accountants) Woo
- Rachel Sung Ting-yee (ABC.P.A) Tsang
- Tam Heung-man (H. of Account./Frontier) Tsang
- Roger Tou Kin-chuen (ABC.P.A) Tsang
- Victor Wai Chi-kin (Dem. A. Accountants) Woo
- Wong Ka-ying (Dem. A. Accountants/Civic) Tsang
- Wong Kin-ching (Dem. A. Accountants) Tsang
- Mary Wong Fung-yee (H. of Account.) Tsang
- Raymond Yeung Chi-leung (H. of Acc..; quit) Woo
- Yuen Shu-tong (Dem. A. Accountants) Tsang

=== Architectural, Surveying, Planning and Landscape ===
- Corrin Chan Chui-yi (Dem. Professionals) Tsang
- Eva Chan Kit-wah (CoVision16) Woo
- Jeremy Chan Yin-lun (Land5cape 2016) Woo
- Paul Chan Yuen-king (Land5cape 2016) Woo
- Steve Chan Yiu-fai (Dem. Professionals) Tsang
- Chan Yiu-kwan (CoVision16) Woo
- Chang Ping-hung (CoVision16) Tsang
- Gavin Scott Coates (CoVision16) Woo
- Kwan Siu-lun (CoVision16) Woo
- Lai Ho-wing (CoVision16) Woo
- Lai Wing-fung (CoVision16) Woo
- Millie Lam Wing-yan (CoVision16) Woo
- Lam Tsz-kwan (CoVision16) Woo
- Derek Lau Siu-hay (CoVision16) Woo
- Lau Hoi-ying (Land5cape 2016) Woo
- Benson Lee Bun (CoVision16) Tsang
- Lee Yuet (Democrat Professionals) Tsang
- Lui Man (CoVision16) Woo
- Carol Ma Kwok-wai (Land5cape 2016) Woo
- Anthony Vincent Ng Wing-shun Lam
- Stanley Ng Wing-fai (D. Prof./Democratic) Tsang
- Ngo Tsz-kei (Land5cape 2016) Woo
- Tony Tse Wai-chuen (PALS)
- Ric Tseung Wai-ki (CoVision16) Woo
- Wong Chi-kwan (CoVision16) Woo
- Christpoher Wong Ching-lok (CoVision16) Tsang
- Marco Wu Moon-hoi (G18+) Lam
- Yim Shun-see Tsang
- Kenneth Yiu Shui-yin (Dem. Professionals) Tsang
- Paulus Johannes Zimmerman (CoVision16) Woo

=== Chinese Medicine ===
- Au Cheuk-wing
- Chan Kong-sang Lam
- Chan Wing-kwong Lam
- Chau Shuk-ying Lam
- Cheung Kwan-sheung Lam
- Cheung Kwok-wah Lam
- Cheung Wai-sang Lam
- Feng Jiu Lam
- Ho Kwok-wai Lam
- Gan Pei-tzeng Lam
- Huang Xianzhang Lam
- Kwan Chi-yee Lam
- Kwan Ka-lun Tsang
- Lee Ka-lun (Democrats 300+) Woo
- Lee Yu-ming Tsang
- Catherine Leung Chau-ying
- Ling Kwan-chun Lam
- Eddie Lo Ting-yu Lam
- Ng Chi-sun
- Ng Chun-loi Lam
- Tsea Ping-chung Lam
- Tsang Chiu-hing Lam
- Tsang Yuk-ting (Democrats 300+) Woo
- Wong Kit Lam
- Wong Kwun-ming Lam
- Haster Wu Ka-yi (Democrats 300+) Woo
- Yeung Cheuk-ming Lam
- Grace Yu Wun-pan Lam
- Yuen Kai-shun Lam
- Zhu En Lam

=== Education ===
- Emily Chan Han-ying (PTU) Tsang
- Chan Hei-tung (PTU) Tsang
- Chan Hon-sum (PTU) Tsang
- Chen Yan-kai (PTU) Tsang
- Cheung Man-kwong (PTU/Democratic) Tsang
- Cheung Siu-chung (PTU) Tsang
- Cheung Wong (PTU) Tsang
- Cheung Yuk-fai (PTU) Tsang
- Ching Cheung-ying (PTU/Democratic) Tsang
- Fong King-lok (PTU) Tsang
- Fung Pik-yee (PTU) Tsang
- Fung Tak-wah (PTU/Democratic) Tsang
- Ho Chi-wai (PTU/Democratic) Tsang
- Ho Chun-fung (PTU) Tsang
- Sanly Kam Shau-wan (PTU) Tsang
- King Chi-yu (PTU) Tsang
- Elaine Kwan Shuk-ling (PTU) Tsang
- Joseph Lai Chi-keong (PTU/Civic) Tsang
- Lam Seung-wan (PTU) Tsang
- Eric Lee Wai-kai (PTU) Tsang
- Lee Ka-wang (PTU) Tsang
- Lo Wai-ming (PTU) Tsang
- Man Ho-yin (PTU) Tsang
- Mok Loi-yan (PTU) Tsang
- Pun Tin-chi (PTU) Tsang
- Eddie Shee Shing-chung (PTU) Tsang
- Tin Fong-chak (PTU) Tsang
- Tsang Sui-ming (PTU) Tsang
- Wong Hak-lim (PTU) Tsang
- Wong Mei-kei (PTU) Tsang

=== Engineering ===
- Philip Au Wai-hung (Prog. Engineering) Woo
- Chan Kin-yung (Prog. Engineering; quit) Tsang
- Johnny Chan Chi-ho (EP30)
- Raymond Chan Kin-sek (EP30) Lam
- Cheung Chun-kit (Prog. Engineering) Woo
- Jovian Cheung Man-chit (EP30)
- Victor Cheung Chi-kong (EP30) Lam
- Raymond Ho Chung-tai (EP30) Lam
- Albert Lai Kwong-tak (Prog. Eng./Civic) Woo
- Iman Lai Wai-man (EP30)
- Lee Chi-ming (Prog. Engineering/PC) Woo
- Lee Ping-kuen (EP30) Lam
- Edmund Leung Kwong-ho (EP30) Lam
- Luk Wang-kwong (EP30) Tsang
- Mak Suet-ching (Prog. Engineering; quit) Tsang
- Alex Ng Cheuk-wai (Prog. Engineering) Woo
- Ngai Hok-yan (Prog. Engineering) Woo
- Paul Poon Wai-yin (EP30) Lam
- Otto Poon Lok-to (EP30) Lam
- So Yiu-kwan (Prog. Engineering/Civic) Woo
- Michelle Tang Ming-sum (EP30)
- Tung Chung-yin (Prog. Engineering; quit) Woo
- Wai Chi-sing (EP30) Lam
- Greg Wong Chak-yan (EP30) Lam
- Wong Ka-cheung (Prog. Engineering) Woo
- Patrick Wong Chun-sing (Prog. Engineering) Woo
- Albert Yeung Tak-chung (Prog. Engineering) Woo
- Yim Kin-ping (EP30) Lam
- Waiky Yiu Kwok-wai (Prog. Engineering; quit) Woo
- Willis Yu Wai-le (Prog. Engineering) Woo

=== Health Services ===
- Chan Siu-ching (H. P. for Democracy) Woo
- Chan Yee-wa (H. P. for Democracy) Woo
- Cheung Ka-yi (H. P. for Democracy) Woo
- Chik Nga-yin (H. P. for Democracy) Woo
- Chiu Cheuk-pong (H. P. for Democracy) Woo
- Chiu Fung-ling (H. P. for Democracy) Woo
- Chiu Shuk-wah (H. P. for Democracy) Woo
- Daisy Chow Hoi-sze (H. P. for Democracy) Tsang
- Fung Chuen-tai (H. P. for Democracy) Woo
- Carman Ho Ka-man (H. P. for Democracy) Woo
- Hung Tsz-yin (H. P. for Democracy) Tsang
- Ip Kim-ching (H. P. for Democracy)
- Ko Chin-pang (H. P. for Democracy)
- Karen Lau (H. P. for Democracy) Woo
- Michael Felix Lau Hoi-man (H. P. for Dem.) Woo
- Vivienne Lee Wai-man (H. P. for Democracy) Woo
- Lee Wing-han (H. P. for Democracy) Woo
- Lit Ming-wai (H. P. for Democracy) Woo
- Ma Kee (H. P. for Democracy/Democratic) Tsang
- Mak Kwan-yin (H. P. for Democracy) Woo
- Ng Chi-kit (H. P. for Democracy) Woo
- Ivaline Poon Sin-man (H. P. for Democracy) Woo
- So Hin-pui (H. P. for Democracy) Woo
- Tam Siu-man (H. P. for Democracy) Woo
- Jason Tong Chin-fung (H. P. for Democracy) Woo
- Tong Leong-kwan (H. P. for Democracy) Woo
- Sally Wan Hoi-wing (H. P. for Democracy) Tsang
- Wong Wing-sze (H. P. for Democracy) Woo
- Desiree Yao Chung-yin (H. P. for Dem.) Tsang
- Yuen Wai-kit (H. P. for Democracy) Tsang

=== Higher Education ===
- Alex Chan Wo-shun (AS of Democracy) Woo
- Jonathan Chan Ming-yin (AS of Democracy) Tsang
- Chan Ka-ming (AS of Democracy/Civic) Tsang
- Chan Kin-man (AS of Democracy) Woo
- Chan Nam-fung (AS of Democracy) Woo
- Chan Sik-chee (AS of Democracy) Woo
- Stephen Chan Ching-kiu (ASD/Civic) Woo
- Roger Cheng Hoi-man (AS of Democracy) Woo
- Cheung Chor-yung (AS of Democracy) Woo
- Cheung Kie-chung (AS of Democracy) Tsang
- Cheung Sing-wai (AS of Democracy) Tsang
- Rodney Chu Wai-chi (AS of Democracy) Tsang
- Fong Chi-wah (AS of Democracy/Civic) Tsang
- Fung Wai-wah (AS of Democracy/PTU) Tsang
- Billy Hung Ying-ho (AS of Democracy/PTU) Tsang
- Kuan Hsin-chi (AS of Democracy/Civic) Woo
- Li Kin-yin (AS of Democracy/Democratic) Tsang
- Bruce Lui Ping-kuen (AS of Democracy) Woo
- Ng Kwok-yan (AS of Democracy) Tsang
- Wiliam Wood Ng Yau-nang (AS of Dem.) Woo
- Emily Owen Oi-ming (AS of Democracy) Woo
- Tai Yiu-ting (AS of Democracy)
- John Tse Wing-ling (AS of Democracy) Tsang
- David Wan Tai-wai (AS of Democracy) Tsang
- Wong Chi-wai (AS of Democracy/PTU) Tsang
- Roger Wong Hoi-fung (AS of Democracy) Tsang
- Yau Kwok-hei (AS of Democracy) Tsang
- Paulin Yeung Po-ling (AS of Democracy) Tsang
- Yuen Hau-yin (AS of Democracy) Woo
- Vera Yuen Wing-han (AS of Democracy) Woo

=== Information Technology ===
- Robin Sarah Bradbeer (IT Vision/Civic) Tsang
- Chan Chak-to (IT Vision/KEC) Woo
- Chan Yu-ming (IT Vision/Civic)
- Ben Cheng Pan-pan (IT Vision) Tsang
- Francis Fong Po-kiu (IT Vision) Tsang
- Erwin Steve Huang (IT Vision) Tsang
- Kwan Tak-wah (IT Vision) Tsang
- William Lai Chi-fu (IT Vision/Civic) Tsang
- Jacky Lam Tak-kei (IT Vision) Woo
- Ken Lam Yat-ming (IT Vision) Tsang
- Leung Siu-cheong (IT Vision) Woo
- Keith Li King-wah (IT Vision) Tsang
- Charles Low Ho-lam (IT Vision) Tsang
- Rick Mak Chi-lit (IT Vision) Tsang
- Steven Mak Tin-chi (IT Vision) Tsang
- Joseph Ng Kee-yin (IT Vision) Tsang
- Sin Chung-kai (IT Vision/Democratic) Tsang
- Sung On-loy (IT Vision) Tsang
- Tsui Chi-ying (IT Vision) Tsang
- Wong Ho-wa (IT Vision) Woo
- Wong Ka-ping (IT Vision) Tsang
- Wong Pak-yu (IT Vision/TSWNF) Woo
- Peter Woo Yan-kit (IT Vision) Woo
- Jacky Yau Chi-kin (IT Vision/Civic) Woo
- Joe Yau Cho-ki (IT Vision) Tsang
- Yeung Lam-fat (IT Vision) Woo
- May Yeung Yuen-cheung (IT Vision) Tsang
- Lento Yip Yuk-fai (IT Vision) Tsang
- Young Wo-sang (IT Vision) Tsang
- Eric Yung Chi-wai (IT Vision) Tsang

=== Legal ===
- Edward Chan King-sang (ProDem21) Woo
- Helena Chan Suk-yee (ProDem21) Tsang
- Stephen Char Shik-ngor (PanDem9/Civic) Tsang
- Cheng Shu-tai (ProDem21) Woo
- Betty Cheung Wai-yee (ProDem21) Tsang
- Eric Cheung Tat-ming (ProDem21)
- Cheung Yiu-leung (ProDem21) Woo
- John Joseph Clancey (ProDem21) Woo
- Philip John Dykes (ProDem21) Woo
- Graham Anthony Harris (ProDem21) Tsang
- Ho Chun-yan (PanDem9/Democratic) Woo
- Frederick Ho Chun-ki (PanDem9/Democratic) Woo
- Douglas Kwok King-hin (ProDem21) Woo
- Kenneth Lam (ProDem21) Woo
- Alan Leong Kah-kit (PanDem9/Civic) Woo
- Liu Sing-lee (PanDem9/ADPL) Woo
- Jonathan Man Ho-ching (ProDem21) Woo
- Senia Ng Sze-nok (ProDem21)
- Robert Pang Yiu-hung (ProDem21) Woo
- Debroa Poon Suk-ying (ProDem21) Woo
- Hectar Pun Hei (ProDem21) Woo
- Randy Shek Shu-ming (ProDem21) Woo
- Jeffrey Tam Chun-kit (PanDem9/Democratic)
- Michael John Vidler (ProDem21) Woo
- Anson Wong Yu-yat (ProDem21)
- Wong Hok-ming (PanDem9/Civic) Woo
- Wong Huk-kam (PanDem9/Labour) Woo
- Wong Kwok-tung (PanDem9/Democratic) Tsang
- Wong Shui-hung (ProDem21) Woo
- Richard Yip Hoi-long (ProDem21) Tsang

=== Medical ===
- Au Yiu-kai (Doc. For Democracy) Tsang
- Augustine Chan Tin-sang (Doc. For Dem.) Woo
- Jason Cheung (Doc. For Democracy) Woo
- Cheung Wing-yung (Doc. For Democracy) Woo
- Choi Kin Tsang
- David Fang (Alliance of 7 Med. Candidates)
- James Fung Tak-kwan (Public Doctor HK) Tsang
- Fung Wai-ching (Doc. For Democracy) Woo
- Hau Kai-ching (Public Doctor HK) Tsang
- Ho Pak-leung Tsang
- Kwong Po-yin (Doc. For Democracy) Woo
- Lau Man-yam (Doc. For Democracy) Tsang
- Aaron Lee Fook-kay (Doc. For Democracy) Woo
- Lee Ying-chi (Doc. For Democracy) Tsang
- Leung Ka-lau Tsang
- Leung Kit-yan (Doc. For Democracy) Woo
- Leung Yuen-yee (Doc. For Democracy) Woo
- Lo Wing-sum (Doc. For Democracy) Woo
- David Christopher Lung (Doc. For Dem.) Tsang
- Ng Chi-ho (Public Doctor HK) Tsang
- Pang Cheung-wah (Doc. For Democracy) Tsang
- Kristine Pang Kit-yi (Doc. For Democracy) Woo
- Seamus Siu Yuk-leung (Public Doctor HK) Tsang
- Tam Kin-ming (Public Doctor HK) Tsang
- Prabowo Tunggal (Public Doctor HK) Tsang
- Wai Shiu-fai (Doc. For Democracy) Woo
- Wong Cheung (Public Doctor HK) Tsang
- Woo Kam-wing (Doc. For Democracy) Woo
- Wong Yam-hong (Doc. For Democracy) Woo
- Marc Yang Li-chuan (Doc. For Democracy) Woo

== Third Sector ==
=== Agriculture and Fisheries ===
- Chan Chi-mang Lam
- Chan Chun-chung Lam
- Chan For-tai Lam
- Chan Kin-yip Lam
- Chan Yun-choi Lam
- Cheng Siu-wah Lam
- Cheng Ting-foo Lam
- Cheng Yau-fuk Lam
- Cheung For-yau Lam
- Cheung Kam-yu Lam
- Cheung Siu-keung Lam
- Cheung Tak-shing Lam
- Chow Ping-fai Lam
- Chow Shui-kan Lam
- Chu Kam-ming Lam
- Fung Chi-hong Lam
- Fung Choi-yuk Lam
- Fung Kin-chung Lam
- Fung Shu-fat Lam
- Ho Yuk-sang Lam
- Keung Pak-ho Lam
- Kwok Chi-yau Lam
- Kwok So Lam
- Kwong Chi-wai Lam
- Lai Chuen-tai Lam
- Lai Muk-kum Lam
- Lai Shing-chai Lam
- Lai Tak-chuen Lam
- Lam Chun-wai Lam
- Lam Kun-so Lam
- Galant Lau Kok-fai Lam
- Lau Kam-fung Lam
- Law Yu-bor Lam
- Lee Choi-wah Lam
- Lee Leung-kei Lam
- Leung Kam-fook Lam
- Leung Koon-ho Lam
- Leung Koon-wah Lam
- Leung Ping-kwan Lam
- Leung To-kan Lam
- Eddie Lo Yam-keung Lam
- Lo Sui-lam Lam
- Ma Kim-ming Lam
- Ng Yat-cheung Lam
- Pang Wah-kan Lam
- Po Ka-ling Lam
- Shek Chung-sang Lam
- So Chi-keung Lam
- Tang Nuen-fun Lam
- Tsang Chu-kwong Lam
- Tsang Kwok-keung Lam
- Wan Chung-ping Lam
- Wan Loi-hei Lam
- Wong Cheung-fat Lam
- Wong Chuen Lam
- Wong For-kam Lam
- Wong Kan-chai Lam
- Wong Yuen-tai Lam
- Wu Chun-yuet Lam
- Yeung Sheung-chun Lam

=== Labour ===
- Au Kai-cheong (FTU)
- Lewis Chan Siu-wah (FTU)
- Chan Tang-yuen (FTU)
- Chau Siu-chung (FLU)
- Cheung Sui-fong (FTU)
- Cheung Wing-ho (FLU)
- Chiang Chiu-lin (FTU)
- Ching Ngon-lai (FTU)
- Chiu Chan-on (FTU)
- Choi Kam-wah (FTU)
- Chow Luen-kiu (FTU) Lam
- Chu Hon-chung (FLU)
- Fung Kuen-kwok (FTU)
- Fung Yuen-han (FTU)
- Huynh Wai-yin (FTU)
- Kwok Hing-wun (FTU)
- Lai Chi-wah (FLU)
- Lam Chi-ting (FTU)
- Lam Chun-sing (FLU)
- Lam Kam-yi (FTU)
- Lam Koon-leung (FTU)
- Lam Shuk-yee (FTU) Lam
- Lam Suk-fun (FTU)
- Lam Tsin-kwok (FTU)
- Lam Wai-kong (FTU)
- Lee Che-kin (FTU)
- Lee Sau-king (FLU) Lam
- Leung Chau-ting (FCSU)
- Juan Leung Chun-yan (FTU)
- Leung Yiu-wah (FLU) Lam
- Ma Kwong-yu (FTU)
- Kevin Mak Pui-tung (FTU)
- Mang Ngai (FLU)
- Ng Chi-man (FLU)
- Edwin Ng Wai-pang (FTU)
- Ng Kwok-kwan (FTU)
- Ng Sai-chung (FTU)
- Ng Ping-hong (FTU)
- Ng Wai-yee (FLU)
- Pan Pey-chyou (FTU)
- Siu Chui-fong (FTU)
- So Pak-tsan (FTU)
- Suen Ming-fung (FTU)
- Tam Chi-chung (FLU) Lam
- Tam Kim-sing (FTU)
- Tang Ka-kwan (FTU)
- Tong Kang-yiu (FTU)
- Tsang Chi-man (FTU)
- Tsang Kam-chiu (FLU)
- Tse King-wa (FTU)
- Tsoi Chung-kin (FTU)
- Tsui Sai-cheung (FTU)
- Kingsley Wong Kwok (FTU)
- Peter Wong Kit-hin (FTU)
- Wong Ping (FTU)
- Wong Wang-yip (FTU)
- Wu Ming-fung (CSGU)
- Yang Kaiqiang (FTU)
- Wilson Yap Yee-liek (FTU)
- Yeung Lin-pik (FTU)

=== Social Welfare ===
- Cecilia Chan Lai-wan (Demo-Social Front) Woo
- Charles Chan Kin-hung (Demo-Social Front) Woo
- Chan Chung-ho (Demo-Social Front) Woo
- Chak Tung-ching (O Superpower) Woo
- Grace Chan Man-yee (O Superpower) Woo
- Jonathan Chan Ching-wa (DS Front) Woo
- Chan Pak-hang (To. for Soc. Welfare) Woo
- Sumly Chan Yuen-sum (DS Front/Civic) Woo
- Chan Tsz-wai (SWGU) Woo
- Chan Wing-kin (Demo-Social Front) Woo
- Francis Chau Yin-ming (Demo-Social Front) Woo
- Cheng Yiu-tung (SWGU) Woo
- Cheung Chi-wai (SWGU) Woo
- Cheung Kwok-che (SWGU/Labour) Woo
- Raymand Cheung Chi-kuen (To. for Soc. W.) Woo
- Chong Chan-yau (Demo-Social Front) Woo
- Chow Yiu-hong (Demo-Social Front/Civic) Woo
- Chu Chi-keung (SWGU) Woo
- Ho Cheuk-hin (To. for Soc. Welfare) Woo
- Ho Yu-ying (To. for Soc. Welfare) Woo
- Hui Kam-shing (Demo-Social Front/ADPL) Woo
- Hui Lai-ming (SWGU) Woo
- Alice Ishigami Lee Fung-king (To. for Soc. W.) Woo
- Kan Chi-wai (SWGU) Woo
- Abdull Ghafar Khan (To. for Soc. Welfare)
- Lai Kin-kwok (Demo-Social Front) Woo
- Lam Keung (Demo-Social Front) Woo
- Lam Wan-chi (SWGU) Woo
- Billie Lau Ching (O Superpower) Woo
- Lau Wah-keung (To. for Soc. Welfare) Woo
- Lay Yan-piau (Demo-Social Front/Civic) Woo
- Lee Chi-kong (O Superpower) Woo
- Clifford Lee Chi-hung (SWGU) Woo
- Vincent Lee Wan-ping (Demo-Social Front) Woo
- Leung Cheung-suen (SWGU) Woo
- Lo Kin-hei (Demo-Social Front/Democratic) Tsang
- Lun Chi-wai (SWGU) Woo
- Mak Hoi-wah (DS Front/Democratic) Tsang
- Tony Mak Wing-tin (SWGU) Woo
- Mak Yun-pui (SWGU) Woo
- Ng Hung-fai (SWGU) Woo
- Ng Kwan-lim (To. for Soc. Welfare) Woo
- Ng Yut-ming (SWGU) Woo
- Raymond Ngan Kam-hung (DS Front) Woo
- Pang Lok-yan (To. for Soc. Welfare) Woo
- Pok Fook-sun (SWGU) Woo
- So Kit-yin (Demo-Social Front) Woo
- Tam Yuen-fun (To. for Soc. Welfare) Woo
- Ting Wai-fong (Reclaiming Social Work Movement)
- Tsang Kin-chiu (SWGU) Woo
- Athena Wong Wing-chi (To. for Soc. Welfare) Woo
- Fermi Wong Wai-fun (To. for Soc. Welfare) Woo
- Wong Kin-wai (Demo-Social Front) Woo
- Wong Yu-cheung (Demo-Social Front) Woo
- Wong Yuk-hay (SWGU) Woo
- Yeung Kaching (Demo-Social Front) Woo
- Yeung Sum (Demo-Social Front/Democratic) Tsang
- Yip Kin-chung (SWGU) Woo
- Yip Kin-keung (To. for Soc. Welfare) Woo
- Albert Yu Kei-yeung (SWGU) Woo

=== Religious ===
==== Catholic Diocese of Hong Kong ====
- Roman Cheung Tsun-ting
- Natalie Chung Yin-yin
- Ip Hing-cheung Tsang
- James Kwok Tsz-kwan Woo
- Leung Tsz-king
- Angela Lo Wai-tak
- Ng Ming-him Tsang
- Wan Siu-fai Tsang
- Wong Ho-fung
- Willy Wong Chung-hin

==== Chinese Muslim Cultural and Fraternal Association ====
- Harry Ha Kay-wai Lam
- Zaman Minhas Qamar Lam
- Sat Che-sang Lam
- Sze-to Lang Lam
- Yacob Tsui Kam-fai Lam
- Ali Tuet Sui-hong Lam
- Ebrahim Yeung Yee-woo Lam
- Yeung Yue-man Lam
- Saeed Uddin Lam
- Sheila Jamillah Wong Hong-kwan Lam

==== Hong Kong Christian Council ====
- Fiona Chan Ho-yan Tsang
- Frank Cheng Chi-yan Lam
- Charles Chu Sai-ping Tsang
- Chu Kut-wai
- Henry Lam
- Kelvin Lau Chi-to Tsang
- Man Ka-leung Tsang
- Tang Wai-yee Tsang
- Yee Shui-yew
- Yeung Tak-yu Woo

==== Hong Kong Taoist Association ====
- Chan Kwok-chiu
- Hau Wing-cheong Lam
- Hung Siu-ling Lam
- Ip Yeng-kwen Lam
- Lee Yiu-fai
- Leung Tak-wah Lam
- Tong Wai-ki Lam
- Francis Wong Shing-yick Lam
- Wong Kin-wing Lam
- Yip Wing-shing Lam

==== Confucian Academy ====
- Chen Ningning Lam
- Huen Kwok-chuen Lam
- Lee Kin-chung Lam
- Lee Man-chun Lam
- Ng Hon-leung Lam
- Ng Wing-chi Lam
- Tong Yeuk-fung Lam
- Tong Yun-kai Lam
- George Yan Fuk-choi Lam
- Yeung Man-lee Lam

==== Hong Kong Buddhist Association ====
- Ho Tak-sum
- Lai Sze-nuen Lam
- Lam Hon-keung Lam
- Lau Chun-fui Lam
- Sik Chi-wai Lam
- Sik Hin-hung Lam
- Sik Ku-tay Lam
- Sik To-ping Lam
- Sik Yin-chi Lam
- Shi Hongming Lam

=== Sports, Performing Arts, Culture and Publication ===
==== Sports ====
- Chan Man-yee Lam
- Amy Chan Lim-chee Lam
- Anthony Chan Wai-lun Lam
- Cheng Ka-ho Lam
- Kenneth Chu Ting-kin Lam
- Kenneth Fok Kai-kong Lam
- Philbe Ho Chung-ho Lam
- Ko Hak-ling Lam
- Wilfred Ng Sau-kei Lam
- Pui Kwan-kay Lam
- William Tong Wai-lun Lam
- Wong Kam-po Lam
- Wong Po-kee Lam
- Ronnie Wong Man-chiu Lam
- Tony Yue Kwok-leung Lam

==== Performing Arts ====
- Chan Chi-kwong Lam
- Chan Wing-mei Lam
- Cheung Hong-tat Lam
- Tom Cheung Ka-lung Lam
- Hung Cho-sing Lam
- Daneil Lam Shiu-ming Lam
- Lester Lam Hau-yin Lam
- Lee Po-on
- Li Kuo-hsing Lam
- Ng Kit-chong Lam
- Ng See-yuen Lam
- Eric Tsang Chi-wai Lam
- Wong Pak-ming Lam
- Derek Yee Tung-sing Tsang
- Alexander Yeung Ching-loong Lam

==== Culture ====
- Au Weng-hei Lam
- Chan Hei-hing Lam
- Chan Kin-bun
- Chan Wing-wah Lam
- Stephen Chow Chun-kay Lam
- Ko Chi-sum Lam
- Cally Kwong Mei-wan Lam
- Lam Sin
- Lee Chack-fan Lam
- Lee Kam-yin Lam
- Warren Mok Wah-yuen Lam
- Elizabeth Wang Ming-chun
- Wilfred Wong Ying-wai
- Yao Jue
- Yuen Siu-fai

==== Publication ====
- Chan Kim-man
- Chan Man-hung
- Hui Chiu-ming
- Lee Ka-kui
- Leung Siu-yin
- Li Ka-ming
- Ng Ching-yee
- Ponch Poon Chi-wai
- Shek Hon-kei
- Patrick Sinn Kwok-chung
- William So Wai-leung
- Tsang Hip-tai
- Edward Wong Sing
- Sharon Wong Yin-yue
- Yeung Kam-kai

== Fourth Sector ==
=== National People's Congress (ex officio) ===
- Laura Cha Shih May-lung Lam
- Cai Yi Lam
- Bernard Charnwut Chan Lam
- Bunny Chan Chung-bun Lam
- Chan Yung (DAB/NTAS) Lam
- Cheng Yiu-tong (FTU) Lam
- Cheung Ming-man (DAB) Lam
- Choy So-yuk (DAB) Lam
- Rita Fan Hsu Lai-tai Lam
- Ian Fok Chun-wan Lam
- Herman Hu Shao-ming Lam
- Ip Kwok-him (DAB) Lam
- Dennis Lam Shun-chiu Lam
- Miriam Lau Kin-yee (Liberal)
- Priscilla Lau Pui-king (DAB) Lam
- Fanny Law Fan Chiu-fun Lam
- Ambrose Lee Siu-kwong
- Sophie Leung Lau Yau-fun Lam
- Li Yinquan Lam
- Martin Liao Cheung-kong (overlapped)
- Lo Shui-on Lam
- Tim Lui Tim-leung Lam
- Ma Fung-kwok (NCF; overlapped) Lam
- Ma Ho-fai Lam
- Ng Chau-pei (FTU) Lam
- Ng Leung-sing Lam
- Ngan Po-ling Lam
- Maria Tam Wai-chu Lam
- Michael Tien Puk-sun (NPP; overlapped)
- David Wong Yau-kar Lam
- Peter Wong Man-kong† Lam
- Wong Ting-chung (DAB) Lam
- Wong Yuk-shan Lam
- Andrew Yao Cho-fai Lam
- Yeung Yiu-chung (DAB) Lam
- Zhang Tiefu Lam

=== Legislative Council (ex officio) ===
- Chan Chi-chuen (People Power)
- Chan Chun-ying Lam
- Chan Hak-kan (DAB/NTAS) Lam
- Chan Han-pan (DAB/NTAS) Lam
- Chan Kin-por
- Pierre Chan Tsang
- Tanya Chan (Civic) Woo
- Cheng Chung-tai (Civic Passion)
- Christopher Cheung Wah-fung (BPA) Lam
- Fernando Cheung Chiu-hung (Labour) Woo
- Cheung Kwok-kwan (DAB) Lam
- Tommy Cheung Yu-yan (Liberal) Lam
- Chiang Lai-wan (DAB) Lam
- Holden Chow Ho-ding (DAB)
- Eddie Chu Hoi-dick
- Chung Kwok-pan (Liberal) Tsang
- Junius Ho Kwan-yiu Lam
- Ho Kai-ming (FTU)
- Steven Ho Chun-yin (DAB) Lam
- Hui Chi-fung (Democratic) Tsang
- Ip Kin-yuen (PTU) Tsang
- Regina Ip (NPP)
- Dennis Kwok Wing-hang (Civic) Woo
- Kwok Ka-ki (Civic)
- Kwok Wai-keung (FTU)
- Kwong Chun-yu (Democratic) Tsang
- Lam Cheuk-ting (Democratic) Tsang
- Jeffrey Lam Kin-fung (BPA) Lam
- Kenneth Lau Ip-keung (BPA) Lam
- Lau Kwok-fan (DAB)
- Lau Siu-lai
- Nathan Law Kwun-chung (Demosisto)
- Joseph Lee Kok-long Woo
- Starry Lee Wai-king (DAB) Lam
- Andrew Leung Kwan-yuen (BPA)
- Leung Che-cheung (DAB//NTAS) Lam
- Kenneth Leung Kai-cheong (PC) Tsang
- Leung Kwok-hung (LSD)
- Priscilla Leung Mei-fun (BPA) Lam
- Leung Yiu-chung (NWSC)
- Martin Liao Cheung-kong (overlapped)
- Lo Wai-kwok (BPA) Lam
- Luk Chung-hung (FTU)
- Ma Fung-kwok (NCF; overlapped) Lam
- Alice Mak Mei-kuen (FTU)
- Claudia Mo (HK First)
- Charles Peter Mok (PC) Tsang
- Jimmy Ng Wing-ka Lam
- Wilson Or Chong-shing (DAB) Lam
- Poon Siu-ping (FLU)
- Elizabeth Quat (DAB)
- Abraham Shek Lai-him (BPA)
- Shiu Ka-chun Woo
- Shiu Ka-fai (Liberal) Lam
- Jeremy Tam Man-ho (Civic) Woo
- Michael Tien Puk-sun (NPP; overlapped)
- James To Kun-sun (Democratic) Tsang
- Paul Tse Wai-chun
- Andrew Wan Siu-kin (Democratic) Tsang
- Helena Wong Pik-wan (Democratic) Tsang
- Wong Kwok-kin (FTU)
- Wong Ting-kwong (DAB) Lam
- Wu Chi-wai (Democratic) Tsang
- Alvin Yeung Ngok-kiu (Civic) Woo
- Frankie Yick Chi-ming (Liberal) Lam
- Yiu Chung-yim Woo
- Yiu Si-wing Lam
- Yung Hoi-yan (NPP)

=== Chinese People's Political Consultative Conference ===
- Eliza Chan Ching-har Lam
- Chan Kam-lam (DAB) Lam
- Chan King-wai Lam
- Chan Shing-sau Lam
- Chau Ho Ta-yuen (DAB) Lam
- Cheng Cheung-ling Lam
- Cheng Kar-shun Lam
- Cheung Kwok-wing Lam
- Alan Chong Shaw-swee (DAB) Lam
- Timpson Chung Shui-ming (DAB) Lam
- Chu Ming-chuan Lam
- Timothy Fok Tsun-ting Lam
- Nellie Fong Wong Kut-man Lam
- Daniel Richard Fung Lam
- Gunter Gao Lam
- Charles Ho Tsu-kwok Lam
- Hui Wing-mau Lam
- Hung Chao-hong Lam
- Alan Hoo (Liberal) Lam
- Kong Tak-ho Lam
- Peter Kwok Viem Lam
- Lam Shu-chit Lam
- Lam Tai-fai Lam
- Lau Hon-chuen (DAB) Lam
- Lawrence Lau Juen-yee Lam
- Lee Ka-kit Lam
- Lee Yin-yee Lam
- Leung Kwok-ching Lam
- Leung Leung-shing Lam
- Leung Wai-ho (DAB) Lam
- Brian David Li Man-bun Lam
- Victor Li Tzar-kuoi Lam
- Liao Cheung-sing Lam
- Changle Liu Lam
- Lo Man-tuen (DAB) Lam
- Francis Lui Yiu-tung Lam
- George Lung Chee-ming Lam
- Ng Leung-ho Lam
- Ng Wai-kuen Lam
- Tai Hay-lap Lam
- Tai Tak-fung Lam
- Tam Kam-kau Lam
- Tam Yiu-chung (DAB) Lam
- Henry Tang Ying-yen Lam
- Peter Woo Kwong-ching Lam
- Wong Cho-bau Lam
- Wong Kwok-keung Lam
- Annie Wu Suk-ching Lam
- Anthony Wu Ting-yuk Lam
- Marjorie Yang Mun-tak Lam
- Samuel Yung Wing-ki Lam

=== Heung Yee Kuk ===
- Carmen Chan Ka-mun Lam
- Chan Shung-fai Lam
- Chan Sung-ip Lam
- Cheung Hok-ming (DAB/NTAS) Lam
- Chow Yuk-tong (NTAS) Lam
- Chung Wai-ping Lam
- Hau Chi-keung Lam
- Tony Kan chung-nin (NTAS) Lam
- Lam Wai-keung Lam
- Lee Koon-hung Lam
- Leung Fuk-yuen Lam
- Li Kwok-fung (NTAS) Lam
- Li Yiu-ban Lam
- Lou Cheuk-wing Lam
- Mok Kam-kwai (BPA) Lam
- Pang Hok-tuen Lam
- Sing Hon-keung (NTAS) Lam
- Tang Ho-nin Lam
- Tang Lai-tung Lam
- Tang Shui-wah Lam
- Tsang Shu-wo Lam
- Wai Kwok-hung Lam
- Ken Wong Hon-kuen Lam
- Wong Man-hon Lam
- Wong Shui-sang Lam
- Yung Chi-ming Lam

=== Hong Kong and Kowloon District Councils ===
- Ben Chan Kok-wah (DAB)
- Chan Choi-hi
- Chan Fu-ming
- Chan Hok-fung (DAB)
- Judy Kapui Chan (NPP)
- Maggie Chan Man-ki
- Nelson Chan Wah-yu
- Stephen Chan Chit-kwai
- Chan Wai-ming (DAB)
- Cheng Chi-sing (DAB)
- Cheng Lee-ming
- Vincent Cheng Wing-shun (DAB)
- Chiu Chi-keung (FTU)
- Cho Wui-hung (BPA)
- Francis Chong Wing-charn (BPA/KWND)
- Jennifer Chow Kit-bing (DAB)
- Chu Ching-hong
- Chung Kong-mo (DAB)
- Ho Hon-man (DAB)
- Hung Kam-in (DAB)
- Hung Lin-cham (DAB)
- Chris Ip Ngo-tung (DAB)
- Kan Chi-ho (DAB)
- Kan Ming-tung (FTU)
- Kung Pak-cheung (DAB)
- Joe Lai Wing-ho (DAB)
- Aaron Lam Ka-fai (BPA/KWND)
- Lam Kai-fai
- Lam Man-fai (FTU)
- Lam Yuk-chun
- Lau Hing-yeung (DAB)
- Lee Chun-keung (Liberal)
- Kenny Lee Kwun-yee (DAB)
- Lee Pik-yee
- Lee Wing-man (FLU)
- Leung Man-kwong (BPA/KWND)
- Li Tak-hong (DAB)
- Lo Yee-hang (DAB)
- Lui Tung-hai
- Luk King-kwong (DAB)
- Ng Fan-kam (DAB)
- Ng Po-keung (DAB)
- Ngan Chun-lim (DAB)
- Pun Kwok-wah (DAB)
- Stephen Ng Kam-chun
- So Lai-chun
- Tam Siu-cheuk (DAB)
- Wong Chun-ping
- Wong Kin-hing
- Wong Kin-pan (DAB)
- Wong Kwok-hing (FTU)
- Wong Shu-ming (BPA/KWND)
- Wong Tat-tung (DAB)
- Yang Wing-kit
- Benny Yeung Tsz-hei (DAB)
- Yiu Pak-leung
- Yuen Kwok-keung (DAB)

=== New Territories District Councils ===
- Au Chi-yuen Lam
- Daniel Cham Ka-hung Lam
- Chan Cho-leung (BPA) Lam
- Chan Kai-wai Lam
- Chan Man-kuen (NPP/CF)
- Chan Pok-chi (DAB) Lam
- Chan Siu-kuen Lam
- Chan Yau-hoi (FTU) Lam
- Cheung Hang-fai (DAB) Lam
- Ching Chan-ming Lam
- Chiu Man-leong (DAB) Lam
- Chiu Sau-han Lam
- Chong Yuen-tung (DAB) Lam
- Koo Yeung-pong (DAB) Lam
- Lai Wai-hung Lam
- Lam Faat-kang Lam
- Nancy Lam Chui-ling Lam
- Larm Wai-leung Lam
- Peter Lau Wai-cheung Lam
- Law King-shing (DAB) Lam
- Alan Lee Chi-keung (BPA) Lam
- Alvin Lee Chi-wing Lam
- Lee Kwan-chun (DAB) Lam
- Lothar Lee Hung-sham (FTU) Lam
- Lee Yuet-man Lam
- Dennis Leung Tsz-wing (FTU) Lam
- Leung Ka-fai (NPP/CF)
- Leung Kin-man (DAB) Lam
- Leung Wai-man (DAB) Lam
- Li Sai-wing (DAB/NTAS) Lam
- Ling Man-hoi (DAB) Lam
- Lo Siu-kit Lam
- Lui Kin (DAB) Lam
- Man Kwong-ming Lam
- Man Yu-ming (NTAS) Lam
- Ng Sze-fuk (DAB) Lam
- Pun Kwok-shan (NPP/CF)
- So Shiu-shing (NPP)
- Thomas Pang Cheung-wai (DAB) Lam
- Poon Chi-shing (DAB) Lam
- Shum Ho-kit Lam
- Siu Long-ming (DAB) Lam
- So Sai-chi (DAB) Lam
- Eric Tam Wing-fun (DAB) Lam
- Tam Wai-chun (BPA) Lam
- Tang Ka-leung Lam
- Tang Ka-piu (FTU) Lam
- To Sheck-yuen Lam
- Tsui Fan (FTU) Lam
- Tsui Hiu-kit (NPP)
- Wan Wo-fai (NTAS) Lam
- Wan Yuet-cheung (NPP/CF)
- Wong Cheuk-kin (NPP)
- Wong Pik-kiu (DAB) Lam
- Wong Wai-kit Lam
- Wong Wang-to (FTU) Lam
- Yiu Kwok-wai (FTU) Lam
- Yiu Ming (NTAS) Lam
- Yu Chi-wing (NTAS) Lam
- Randy Yu Hon-kwan Lam
