= Wireless Technology Industry Association =

WTIA
- WTIA's logo
- Established: 2001; 25 years ago
- Type: NGO
- Headquarters: 9/F, Tungtex Building, 203 Wai Yip Street, Kwun Tong
- Location: Kowloon, Hong Kong
- Region served: Asia
- Key people: Keith Li (Chairman)
- Website: hkwtia.org

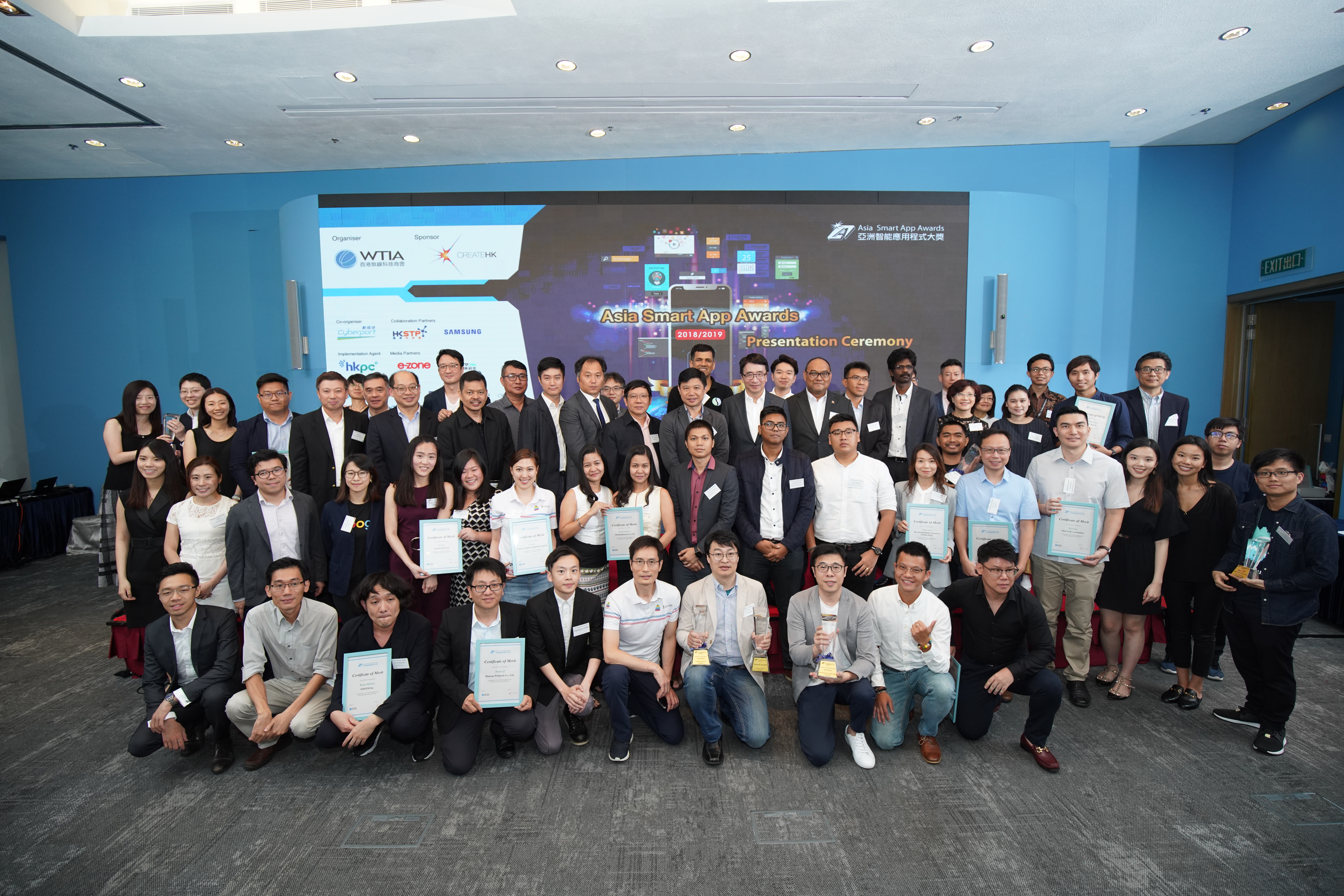
Asia Smart App Awards 2019 at Cyberport

The Wireless Technology Industry Association (WTIA) is a non-profit trade association based in Hong Kong to promote the development, usage and awareness of wireless technology applications in Hong Kong; and to enhance communication and partnership between different types of companies in the wireless technology industry.

WTIA acts as a platform, an aggregator, and community for industry professionals to learn and drive emerging wireless and mobile technologies, governance, and standards.

== Asia Smart App Awards ==
The awards is organised by WTIA annually with the support of Create Hong Kong (CreateHK) of the Government of the Hong Kong Special Administrative Region. The “Hong Kong Mobile Apps Industry Survey”, is commissioned by WTIA, a project of the Hong Kong Productivity Council (HKPC), as part of its annual Asia Smart App Awards Summit.

WTIA conducts Asia Smart Apps Contest at Cyberport to organise the Asia Smart App Awards in collaboration with other co-organizers from the Mainland China, Israel, Indonesia, Japan, Korea, Malaysia, Philippines, Singapore, Taiwan, Thailand, Vietnam, Sri Lanka and Myanmar.

== See also ==
- Hong Kong Telecom
