= Industrial (First) functional constituency =

Functional constituency of Hong Kong

Industrial (First) 工業界（第一）
- Functional constituency for the Legislative Council of Hong Kong
- Region: Hong Kong
- Electorate: 345

Current constituency
- Created: 1985
- Number of members: One
- Member: Wong Wing-wai (BPA)

The Industrial (First) functional constituency (Chinese: 工業界（第一）功能界別) is a functional constituency in the elections for the Legislative Council of Hong Kong first created in 1985. The constituency is composed of corporate members of the Federation of Hong Kong Industries who are entitled to vote at general meetings of the Federation. In 2021, there were 421 corporate electors in the constituency.

== Return members ==
| Election | Member | Party |
|---|---|---|
| 1985 | Stephen Cheong | Independent |
| 1988 | Stephen Cheong | Independent→BPF |
| 1991 | Stephen Cheong | BPF |
| 1993 (b) | James Tien | BPF→Liberal |
| 1995 | James Tien | Liberal |
Not represented in PLC (1997–1998)
| 1998 | Kenneth Ting | Liberal |
| 2000 | Kenneth Ting | Liberal |
| 2004 | Andrew Leung | Liberal |
| 2008 | Andrew Leung | Liberal→Independent→Economic Synergy |
| 2012 | Andrew Leung | Economic Synergy→BPA |
| 2016 | Andrew Leung | BPA |
| 2021 | Andrew Leung | BPA |
| 2025 | Wong Wing-wai | BPA |

== Electoral results ==
=== 2020s ===
2025 Legislative Council election: Industrial (First)
| Party | Candidate | Votes | % | ±% |
|---|---|---|---|---|
| BPA | Ray Wong Wing-wai | 153 | 64.02 | |
| BPA | Terrence Hui Man-chun | 86 | 35.98 | |
| Majority | | 67 | 20.04 | |
| Total valid votes | | 239 | 100.00 | |
| Rejected ballots | | 7 | | |
| Turnout | | 246 | 71.30 | −3.7 |
| Registered electors | | 345 | | |
| BPA hold | | Swing | | |

2021 Legislative Council election: Industrial (First)
| Party | Candidate | Votes | % | ±% |
|---|---|---|---|---|
| BPA | Andrew Leung Kwan-yuen | 235 | 77.81 | |
| Liberal | Leung Yat-cheong | 67 | 22.19 | |
| Majority | | 168 | 55.62 | |
| Total valid votes | | 302 | 100.00 | |
| Rejected ballots | | 1 | | |
| Turnout | | 303 | 75.00 | |
| Registered electors | | 421 | | |
| BPA hold | | Swing | | |

=== 2010s ===
2016 Legislative Council election: Industrial (First)
| Party | Candidate | Votes | % | ±% |
|---|---|---|---|---|
| BPA | Andrew Leung Kwan-yuen | Unopposed | | |
| Registered electors | | 544 | | |
| BPA hold | | Swing | | |

2012 Legislative Council election: Industrial (First)
| Party | Candidate | Votes | % | ±% |
|---|---|---|---|---|
| Economic Synergy | Andrew Leung Kwan-yuen | Unopposed | | |
| Registered electors | | 603 | | |
| Economic Synergy hold | | Swing | | |

=== 2000s ===
2008 Legislative Council election: Industrial (First)
| Party | Candidate | Votes | % | ±% |
|---|---|---|---|---|
| Liberal | Andrew Leung Kwan-yuen | Unopposed | | |
| Registered electors | | 715 | | |
| Liberal hold | | Swing | | |

2004 Legislative Council election: Industrial (First)
| Party | Candidate | Votes | % | ±% |
|---|---|---|---|---|
| Liberal | Andrew Leung Kwan-yuen | Unopposed | | |
| Registered electors | | 804 | | |
| Liberal hold | | Swing | | |

2000 Legislative Council election: Industrial (First)
| Party | Candidate | Votes | % | ±% |
|---|---|---|---|---|
| Liberal | Kenneth Ting Woo-shou | 305 | 57.22 | |
| Independent | Cheng Siu-king | 228 | 42.78 | |
| Majority | | 77 | 14.44 | |
| Total valid votes | | 533 | 100.00 | |
| Rejected ballots | | 7 | | |
| Turnout | | 540 | 72.78 | |
| Registered electors | | 742 | | |
| Liberal hold | | Swing | | |

=== 1990s ===
1998 Legislative Council election: Industrial (First)
| Party | Candidate | Votes | % | ±% |
|---|---|---|---|---|
| Liberal | Kenneth Ting Woo-shou | Unopposed | | |
| Registered electors | | 730 | | |
| Liberal hold | | Swing | | |

1995 Legislative Council election: Industrial (First)
| Party | Candidate | Votes | % | ±% |
|---|---|---|---|---|
| Liberal | James Tien Pei-chun | Unopposed | | |
| Registered electors | | 781 | | |
| Liberal hold | | Swing | | |

1993 First Industrial by-election
| Party | Candidate | Votes | % | ±% |
|---|---|---|---|---|
| BPF | James Tien Pei-chun | Unopposed | | |
| BPF hold | | Swing | | |

1991 Legislative Council election: First Industrial
| Party | Candidate | Votes | % | ±% |
|---|---|---|---|---|
| BPF | Stephen Cheong Kam-chuen | Unopposed | | |
| Registered electors | | 460 | | |
| BPF hold | | Swing | | |

=== 1980s ===
1988 Legislative Council election: First Industrial
| Party | Candidate | Votes | % | ±% |
|---|---|---|---|---|
| Independent | Stephen Cheong Kam-chuen | Unopposed | | |
| Independent hold | | Swing | | |

1985 Legislative Council election: First Industrial
| Party | Candidate | Votes | % | ±% |
|---|---|---|---|---|
| Independent | Stephen Cheong Kam-chuen | Unopposed | | |
| Independent win (new seat) | | | | |
