= Eunice Yung =

Hong Kong barrister and politician

The Honourable Eunice Yung Hoi-yan
- 容海恩
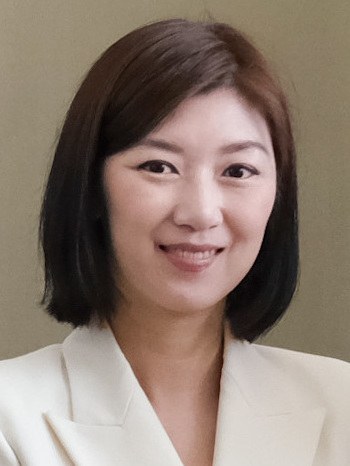
- Yung in 2023

Member of the Legislative Council
- In office 1 January 2022 – 31 December 2025
- Preceded by: New constituency
- Constituency: Election Committee
- In office 1 October 2016 – 31 December 2021
- Preceded by: James Tien
- Succeeded by: Constituency abolished
- Constituency: New Territories East

Personal details
- Born: 7 June 1977 (age 49) Hong Kong
- Party: New People's Party (2016–present)
- Other political affiliations: Civil Force
- Spouse: Derek Yuen (m. 2018)
- Children: 1
- Parent: Yung Yan-biu
- Education: St. Francis' Canossian College; Rosaryhill School; University of British Columbia; City University of Hong Kong
- Profession: Barrister
- Website: euniceyung.hk

Eunice Yung Hoi-yan (Chinese: 容海恩; born 7 June 1977) is a Hong Kong barrister and pro-Beijing politician. Once the vice-chairman of the New People's Party (NPP), she became a member of the Legislative Council of Hong Kong for New Territories East in 2016 and for Election Committee in 2021. She stepped down in 2025 amidst concerns that she may not be able to seek another term after her father-in-law was placed with bounty by the national security police.

== Early life ==
Yung was born in Hong Kong in 1977 and was educated at St. Francis' Canossian College and Rosaryhill School. She went on to study computer science at the University of British Columbia (UBC) and graduated in 2001. Unsuccessful in her bid to begin her chosen career as a gaming programmer, she stayed on as a research assistant and helped develop a journal research programme at UBC. After she returned to Hong Kong in the summer of 2003, she studied law at the City University of Hong Kong and qualified as a barrister in 2008.

== Political career ==
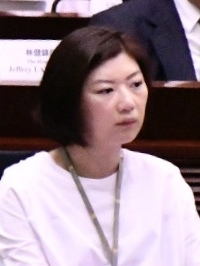
Yung in 2019

Yung became a volunteer legal consultant of the New Home Association, a pro-Beijing non-governmental organisation that helps mainland Chinese immigrants and ethnic minorities integrate into Hong Kong society. She was also founding member of the Hong Kong Professionals and Senior Executives Association, a pro-Beijing professionals' association where she broadened her social circle by meeting with political and business figures. In 2015, she founded the Youth and Professional Network to help young people with start-ups.

Yung joined Civil Force (CF), a pro-Beijing Sha Tin-based political group that formed an alliance with the New People's Party (NPP) in February 2014, effecting the expansion of Regina Ip's party from Hong Kong Island to New Territories East.

In 2016, Yung became the NPP–CF candidate in the Legislative Council election, leading a seven-member ticket in New Territories East and won a seat with 36,183 votes.

== Political views ==
In securing her Legislative Council seat, Yung is widely considered to have received support from the central government's liaison office based in Sai Wan, with which she has confessed a "working relationship", earning her the nickname, "Goddaughter of Sai Wan". She is best known for her interest in the promotion of e-sports and her statement that "there should not be too much politics inside or outside of the legislature". She considers Regina Ip her political mentor.

In May 2018, Eunice Yung caused controversy by stating that domestic workers in Hong Kong often gather in large groups in public areas, thus they affect the hygiene and daily lives of other members of the public and nearby shops. She suggested the government should segregate them by providing additional activity centres for them. Several groups representing Hong Kong's domestic workers including The International Migrants Alliance, Asian Migrants Coordinating Body and Hong Kong Confederation of Trade Unions condemned the remarks as racist against migrant domestic workers in Hong Kong, saying it contributed to discrimination against ethnic minorities. A few days later, around 150 people from the same groups held a protest outside the New People's Party Headquarters calling Yung to retract her remarks and apologise. Yung met with the protesters briefly, saying "I didn’t intend to offend any domestic helpers, and if they felt disrespected, I am sorry."

In February 2021, Yung voiced concerns that the 2019-20 Hong Kong protests had protesters who were recruited with drugs, a claim that police commissioner Chris Tang said there was no evidence for.

In March 2021, Yung said that shows at West Kowloon Cultural District's M+ Museum caused "great concern" to her and the public, and claimed that they are "spreading hatred" against mainland China. Yung also claimed that "If you point your middle finger towards Tiananmen Square, it means you want to show your anger against it, or you want to subvert the government with your artwork," to which Ai Weiwei responded "All artworks, if they are of value, raise questions and challenges. Challenging authority is one of the core values of art" and "If she thinks artworks are just ornaments, then I'd say she doesn’t understand art."

Also in March 2021, Yung asked commerce secretary Edward Yau about what the government would do to implement supervision of RTHK.

In March 2021, Yung also expressed her support for cotton from Xinjiang, after several companies stopped purchasing the cotton due to concerns about human rights violations. Yung claimed that companies were boycotting the cotton based on erroneous information, and that "I will not pay for lies. We should firmly safeguard our national image and interests."

On 13 August 2021, the pro-Beijing newspaper Wen Wei Po published an article which quoted Yung as saying that the Hong Kong Journalists Association had continuously spread "anti-government" views.

In August 2022, Yung paid for a newspaper advert, where she publicly criticized her father-in-law, Elmer Yuen Gong-yi, and said that the "righteousness of the country" and the national security law was more important than her family.

In January 2023, Yung asked what the government was doing to promote the "correct national anthem" on Google, instead of Glory to Hong Kong, and asked whether the government would ask Google to "update its algorithms." Later in July 2023, Yung said that after the government lost a High Court attempt to ban the song, the court's ruling showed some people "lacked basic understanding” of national security.

In February 2023, Yung said that government-subsidized continuing education courses should be subject to the national security law.

In May 2023, the Legislative Council voted with 100% approval to let the chief executive restrict overseas lawyers from national security cases, following attempts by the government to block Jimmy Lai from hiring Tim Owen as his defense lawyer; Yung said that the new law would not harm defendants from a fair trial.

Yung did not seek another term in 2025 as her name did not appear on the candidate list put forward by her party. She acknowledged that her father-in-law's bounty was one of the factors that impeded her political career but denied it as the key reason for her stepping down.

== Personal life ==
Yung is an avid gamer, describing herself as a "tech girl".

Yung married Derek Yuen Mi-chang, the policy director of New People's Party, in August 2018. Mimi and Erica Yuen, executive directors of Mi Ming Mart, are Yung's sisters-in-law. Erica is also the former chairwoman of People Power, a pro-democracy political party and a candidate for the 2016 Legislative Council election.

In September 2018, she announced that she was four months pregnant. Her daughter was born 23 January 2019, making Yung the first sitting Hong Kong legislator to give birth.

On 5 January 2022, Carrie Lam announced new warnings and restrictions against social gathering due to potential COVID-19 outbreaks. One day later, it was discovered that Yung attended a birthday party hosted by Witman Hung Wai-man, with 222 guests. At least one guest tested positive with COVID-19, causing all guests to be quarantined. Yung was warned by Legislative Council president Andrew Leung to not attend any meetings until after finishing her last mandatory COVID-19 test on 22 January 2022. However, she decided to attend the meeting on 19 January 2022, against Leung's orders.

In July 2023, her father-in-law Elmer Yuen was placed on the list of wanted persons by the National Security Department of the police force for national security offences. Yung's home was then searched by the national security police. Yuen declared breaking off relationship with her "former" father-in-law Elmer Yuen, but she said she would not divorce with Derek Yuen.

Legislative Council of Hong Kong
Preceded by James Tien	Member of Legislative Council; Representative for New Territories East; 2016–2021	Constituency abolished
New constituency	Member of Legislative Council; Representative for Election Committee; 2022–2025	Succeeded by
Order of precedence
Preceded by Wilson Or; Member of the Legislative Council	Hong Kong order of precedence Member of the Legislative Council	Succeeded by Pierre Chan; Member of the Legislative Council
