= Andrew Leung =

Hong Kong politician (born 1951)

The Honourable Andrew Leung GBM GBS MBE JP
- 梁君彥
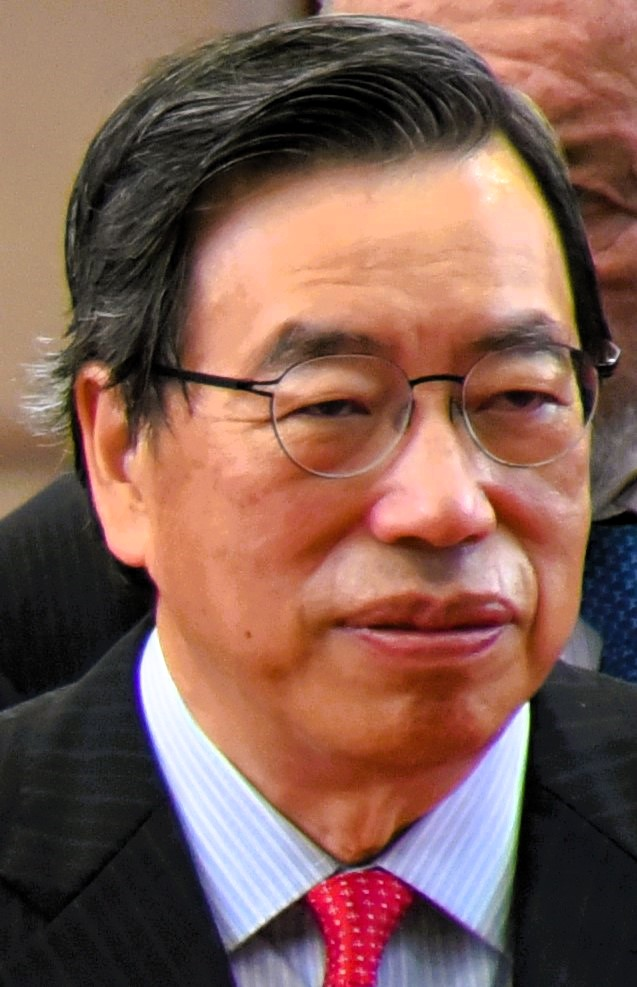
- Leung in 2023

3rd President of the Legislative Council
- In office 12 October 2016 – 31 December 2025
- Deputy: Starry Lee
- Preceded by: Jasper Tsang
- Succeeded by: Starry Lee

Chairman of the Business and Professionals Alliance for Hong Kong
- In office 7 October 2012 – 13 October 2016
- Preceded by: New party
- Succeeded by: Lo Wai-kwok

Member of the Legislative Council
- In office 1 October 2004 – 31 December 2025
- Preceded by: Kenneth Ting
- Succeeded by: Wong Wing-wai
- Constituency: Industrial (First)

Chairman of the Federation of Hong Kong Industries
- In office 2003–2004
- Preceded by: Victor Lo
- Succeeded by: Kenneth Ting

Personal details
- Born: 24 February 1951 (age 75) Hong Kong
- Party: BPA (since 2012)
- Other political affiliations: Liberal Party (until 2008); Economic Synergy (2009-2012)
- Spouse: Susana Cheong Suk-hing
- Children: Clarence Leung Wang-ching
- Education: St. Francis Xavier's School
- Alma mater: University of Leeds (BS)
- Occupation: Merchant

Andrew Leung
- Traditional Chinese: 梁君彥
- Simplified Chinese: 梁君彦
Transcriptions
Standard Mandarin
- Hanyu Pinyin: Liáng Jūnyàn
Yue: Cantonese
- Yale Romanization: Lèuhng Gwān-yihn
- Jyutping: Loeng^{4} Gwan^{1}-jin^{6}

Andrew Leung Kwan-yuen GBM GBS MBE JP (Chinese: 梁君彥; born 24 February 1951) is a Hong Kong politician who was the President of the Legislative Council of Hong Kong between 2016 and 2025.

He was elected to the legislature representing the Industrial (First) functional constituency before retiring in 2025, and served as the chairman of Business and Professionals Alliance for Hong Kong (BPA), the second largest party in the Legislative Council, from October 2012 to October 2016. During his nine-year presidency, the Legislative Council underwent revamp that saw the pro-democracy opposition removed and barred from being elected following Beijing's imposition of national security law, while the chamber fast-tracked legislations and was slammed for lacking meaningful debates.

== Early life and education ==
Leung was born on 24 February 1951 to a family who run a textile factory, the Sun Hing knitting company. He was educated in the University of Leeds and joined his father's family business. In 1970, he set up the Sun Hing Knitting Factory in Kwai Chung and became the chairman of the company.

== Public service career ==
Leung joined the Hong Kong Woollen & Synthetic Knitting Manufacturers' Association, the chamber of commerce of the manufacturing companies, in which he later became the honorary president in 1997. He has been the chairman and Honorary Chairman of the Textile Council of Hong Kong and the member, Deputy chairman and Chairman of the Federation of Hong Kong Industries. He stepped down in 2004 after he was elected to the Legislative Council of Hong Kong and became the Honorary chairman.

He has been the committee member of both Textile and Clothing Industry Training Board in the 1980s, and became a member of Vocational Training Council (VTC) board of directors in 1998, he was then appointed as the chairman of VTC from 2006 to 2012. He has also held many positions including Chairman of the Hong Kong Productivity Council (2003–2009), council member of the Hong Kong Trade Development Council (2010–2016), a member of the Economic Development Commission (2013–2017), the Deputy Chairman of the Business Facilitation Advisory Committee (2012–2016), a non-executive director of the Mandatory Provident Fund Schemes Authority (2009–2015) and a Director of The Hong Kong Mortgage Corporation Limited.

He was awarded Justice of the Peace in 1996 and Member of the Order of the British Empire (MBE) for his services to the textile industry in 1997.

== Legislative Councillor ==
In the 2004 Legislative Council election, he replaced Kenneth Ting Woo-shou to be elected uncontestedly to the Legislative Council of Hong Kong through the Industrial (First) functional constituency which was elected by the Federation of Hong Kong Industries, representing the Liberal Party.

Leung split apart from the Liberal Party in October 2008 with Jeffrey Lam Kin-fung and Sophie Leung Lau Yau-fun after the defeat of the party in the 2008 Legislative Council election in September and the resignation of chairman James Tien Pei-chun. In June 2009, the three legislators formed the Economic Synergy which later co-founded the Business and Professionals Alliance for Hong Kong (BPA) in 2012 which Leung became the founding Chairman of the new party.

Leung was also the committee member of 11th National Committee of the Chinese People's Political Consultative Conference. He was awarded the Silver Bauhinia Star (SBS) and the Gold Bauhinia Star (GBS) in 2004 and 2010 respectively.

On the debate over the 2014–15 Hong Kong electoral reform for the universal suffrage of the Chief Executive of Hong Kong, Leung opposed to the Occupy Central with Love and Peace campaign by the pan-democracy camp, appealed to the "silent majority" to oppose "Occupy protest". Leung said the campaign would threaten the rule of law and social stability, while hurting Hong Kong's business environment.

== President of the Legislative Council ==
After the 2016 Hong Kong Legislative Election, Leung was handpicked by the pro-Beijing camp to be their candidate for the President of the Legislative Council of Hong Kong left over by the retiring Jasper Tsang, after potential candidates New People's Party's Michael Tien and nonpartisan Paul Tse withdrew their nominations, implicitly citing the influence of the Liaison Office. Leung was questioned by the opposition over his British nationality which he renounced right before the vote and his close business ties with 11 companies in which he held shares and was the directors of seven of them. On the first meeting of the Legislative Council, Leung was elected as president in the middle of chaos as the pan-democrats and localists tore up their ballot papers and stormed out of the meeting room before the vote. As a result, Leung received 38 votes against pro-democrat nominee James To's zero with three blank ballots.

On 27 October, Leung was slammed and asked to step down after he took a U-turn by deciding to delay the oath-taking of Sixtus Leung and Yau Wai-ching of Youngspiration whose qualifications were under legal challenge by the government for their pro-independence on general meeting on 27 October 2016. Leung and Yau inserted their own words into the oath-taking on the first session of the Legislative Council and therefore were invalidated by the LegCo general secretary Kenneth Chen. Andrew Leung initially allowed the two to retake the oaths but backed down after the pro-Beijing camp threatened to stage a second walkout after they walked out in the on 19 October to block the two Youngspiration elected-legislators to take the oaths. The pan-democracy camp criticised Leung for "unfit to perform his role".

In November 2020, following the expulsion of 4 pro-democracy lawmakers from the Legislative Council, Leung said that he "respects and understands" their disqualification.

In February 2021, after Xia Baolong said that only "patriots" could be part of the Hong Kong government, Leung agreed and said it was the "most basic and reasonable" requirement for those in the government. Additionally, Leung claimed that "I am sure that all the Hong Kong people will have a say... As long as you are patriotic, you can have any views."

In January 2022, the mainland Chinese national emblem was permanently added to the Legislative Council chamber, after Andrew Leung, Starry Lee Wai-king and Ma Fung-kwok decided that it should be made permanent. Andrew Leung had earlier said it would be only temporary for the swearing in of lawmakers, but reversed course.

In December 2022, after only "patriots" were allowed to administer Hong Kong, Leung denied that lawmakers were simply rubber stamping legislation, stating "We need to work together to make sure the legislative process is smooth. Smooth doesn't mean rubber stamp."

In January 2023, Leung criticized a decision by the UK to not allow Legislative Council members to attend the Commonwealth Parliamentary Association UK’s seminar, saying that the event had "blatant political bias."

On 29 September 2025, Leung announced his retirement from LegCo after his discussion with his family.

== Personal life ==
His wife, Susana Cheong Suk-hing, is the sister of former member of the Legislative Council Stephen Cheong.

In August 2022, Leung and his son, Clarence Leung Wang-ching, the Under Secretary for Home and Youth Affairs, were deemed close contacts after a family member tested positive for COVID-19. However on December, Leung was tested positive for COVID-19.

== See also ==
- Federation of Hong Kong Industries
- Industrial (First)

Business positions
Preceded by Victor Lo	Chairman of Federation of Hong Kong Industries; 2003–2004	Succeeded by Kenneth Ting
Political offices
Preceded by Kenneth Fang	Chairman of Hong Kong Productivity Council; 2003–2009	Succeeded by Clement Chen
Legislative Council of Hong Kong
Preceded by Kenneth Ting	Member of Legislative Council; Representative for Industrial (First); 2004–present	Succeeded by Wong Wing-wai
Preceded by Miriam Lau	Chairman of House Committee; 2012–2016	Succeeded by Starry Lee
Preceded by Jasper Tsang	President of the Legislative Council of Hong Kong; 2016–2025	Incumbent
Party political offices
New title	Chairman of Business and Professionals Alliance for Hong Kong; 2012–2016	Succeeded by Lo Wai-kwok
Order of precedence
Preceded by Paul Lam; Secretary for Justice	Hong Kong order of precedence President of the Legislative Council	Succeeded by Regina Ip; Convenor of the Executive Council
