= Francis Tien =

Hong Kong entrepreneur and politician

Francis Yuan-hao Tien CBE, LLD, DSoSc, JP
- 田元灝

Unofficial Member of the Legislative Council
- In office 3 July 1974 – 7 August 1985
- Appointed by: Sir Murray MacLehose; Sir Edward Youde

Personal details
- Born: 1915 Suzhou, China
- Died: 1992 (aged 76–77)
- Spouse: Grace Tien Yung Chia-weng
- Children: James Tien; Michael Tien
- Education: Henry Lester Institute of Technical Education; Manchester College of Technology
- Occupation: Merchant politician

Francis Yuan-hao Tien CBE, LLD, DSoSc, JP (Chinese: 田元灝; 1915–1992) was a Hong Kong entrepreneur and the unofficial member of the Legislative Council of Hong Kong.

== Early life and business career ==
Francis Tien was born in Suzhou, a town located about 75 km from Shanghai. His father originally came from Anhui and settled in the Suzhou region and started a textile production business. Francis Tien was studied at a junior school in Suzhou and mechanical engineering at the Henry Lester Institute of Technical Education in Shanghai and graduate in 1942. During his study in Shanghai he undertook an intensive study of English, spending at least ten hours a week reading English, especially on Shakespeare's Julius Caesar.

He went to Chongqing during the Second Sino-Japanese War and worked at power stations. He trained at Metropolitan-Vickers in Manchester and took a course at the Manchester College of Technology before he moved to Hong Kong when the Chinese Communist Party took over the Mainland.

Tien lent his skills to steel engineering in 1950 when steel became an essential raw material need as the Korean War broke out. He turned to textile industry after the steel lost its immediate appeal at the time when textiles were the main sources of the Hong Kong exports. Tien formed his own company the Manhattan Garments and concentrated on making and design of trousers and became a Hong Kong super-salesman journeyed all over the world to promote Hong Kong textile products.

== Public services ==
Between 1966 and 1977, Tien went to Canada and the United States every year, Switzerland four times and Sweden and the European Economic Community on many occasions for the Hong Kong Government Textile Delegations.

Tien was extremely active in manpower training and industry education, piloting through such ventures as the apprenticeship training scheme and the Clothing Industry Training Centre at Kwai Chung. He was appointed chairman of the Clothing Industrial Committee of the Industrial Training Advisory Committee, the predecessor of the Hong Kong Training Council.

In 1974, Tien was appointed to serve on the Legislative Council of Hong Kong, representing the interest of the massive textiles industry as he stated "exports of textiles and garments account for approximately 50 per cent of our total exports and provide employment for about half of our manufacturing workforce." He was appointed chairman of Clothing Industry Training Board of the Hong Kong Training Council and chairman of the Training Authority for the Clothing Industry in 1975 after the enactment of the Industrial Training (Clothing Industry) Ordinance.

During his service on the Legislative Council, Tien witnessed the Sino-British negotiations on the sovereignty of Hong Kong and the Sino-British Joint Declaration in 1984.

Tien was the member of the University Council of the Chinese University of Hong Kong. Grace Tien Hall, a 300-bed student hostel was named after his wife, after he donated part of the construction cost.

== Family ==
Francis Tien married to Yung Chia-weng and had two sons who are both Legislative Council members. The elder son James Tien Pei-chun followed his father's footstep as member of the Legislative Council appointed in 1988. James became the chairman of the Liberal Party and was the unofficial member of the Executive Council between 2002 and 2003. The younger son Michael Tien Puk-sun founded the G2000 clothing retail chain and was the chairman of the Kowloon-Canton Railway Corporation. Michael was elected member of the Legislative Council in 2012.

== Honours ==
Francis Tien was appointed Justice of the Peace in 1967 and received Member and Officer of the Order of the British Empire in 1971 and 1973 respectively. He was rewarded Commander of the Order of the British Empire later on and Queen's Silver Jubilee Medal in 1977. He also became the honorary distinguished citizen of the State of Washington, United States in 1978.

He also received the honorary degrees of Doctor of Laws by the University of Hong Kong in 1971 and Doctor of Social Science by the Chinese University of Hong Kong in 1983 for his education to commerce, industry and government and for his dedication to the promotion of Hong Kong's staple commodity.
