= Federation of Hong Kong Industries =

- Abbreviation: FHKI
- Formation: 1960; 66 years ago
- Legal status: Not-for-profit organization
- Purpose: Federation of Hong Kong industrial companies
- Region served: Hong Kong
- Chairman: Steve Chuang
- Website: Federation of Hong Kong Industries

The Federation of Hong Kong Industries (FHKI; Chinese: 香港工業總會) is the only statutory industrial organization in Hong Kong, established under the Federation of Hong Kong Industries Ordinance, Cap. 321 of the laws of Hong Kong, in 1960.

It supports start-ups and industrial companies across 33 industries in Hong Kong, including biotechnology, information technology, automation technology, garment and textile, food and beverage, plastics and metals, and electronics

== Structure ==
The Federation has a total of 33 industry groups, ranging from manufacturing to producer services sectors. It also sets up various cross-sector councils and committees, including Innovation and Technology Development Committee, Hong Kong Startup Council, Pearl River Delta Council, etc.

The General Committee is the Federation's policymaking and management body. It constitutes the Chairperson of 33 Industry Groups, five members appointed by the Federation, three members appointed by the Hong Kong government, and five co-opted members.

== Legislative Council Representative ==
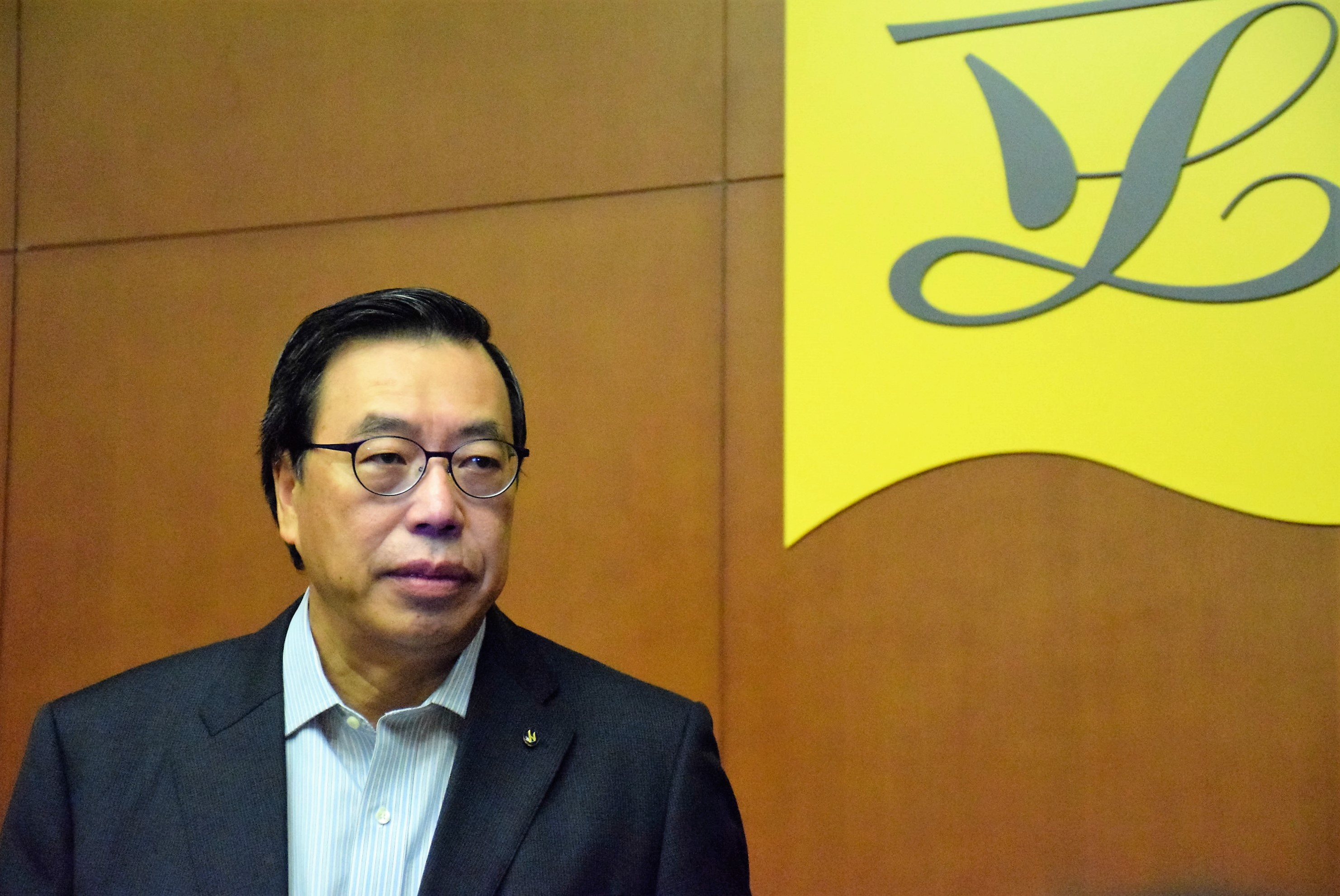
Andrew Leung as Chairman of Legislative Council

The industrial (first) functional constituency of the Legislative Council of Hong Kong is composed of corporate members of the Federation of Hong Kong Industries entitled to vote at general meetings of the Federation.

The present representative is Andrew Leung (2004-present), who is also the current President of the Legislative Council of Hong Kong.

Election	Member	Party
1985	Stephen Cheong	Nonpartisan
1988	Stephen Cheong	Nonpartisan→BPF
1991	Stephen Cheong	BPF
1993 (b)	James Tien	BPF→Liberal
1995	James Tien	Liberal
Not represented in PLC (1997–1998)	James Tien	
1998	Kenneth Ting	Liberal
2000	Kenneth Ting	Liberal
2004	Andrew Leung	Liberal
2008	Andrew Leung	Liberal→Independent→Economic Synergy
2012	Andrew Leung	Economic Synergy→BPA
2016	Andrew Leung	BPA
2021	Andrew Leung	BPA

== Key Councils and Committees ==
=== Hong Kong Q-Mark Council ===
The Hong Kong Q-Mark Council, established under the auspices of the Federation in 1978, is a pioneer that urges high-quality products and services. Through the Hong Kong Q-Mark Schemes, the Council encourages local industry players to strive towards high quality, high value-added, and to develop their own brands.

The Q-Mark Schemes are one of the highest accolades in the local market, and they consist of four types, the Hong Kong Q-Mark Product Scheme, the Hong Kong Q-Mark Service Scheme, the Hong Kong Q-Mark Service Scheme and the Hong Kong Green Mark Certification Scheme. Companies with operations in Hong Kong, the Mainland and Macau are eligible to apply to any one of the Schemes.

=== Hong Kong Startup Council ===
Established under Federation of Hong Kong Industries in 2016, Hong Kong Startup Council is devoted to serving as a platform to ramp up the growth of early-stage and growing startups by connecting them with seasoned industrialists, like-minded innovators, investors, the R&D sector and the youth. The Council is tasked to turn innovative ideas into commercially viable products or services, with the purpose of creating synergies between Hong Kong’s established and new economies.

=== Pearl River Delta Council ===
Established in 2004, Pearl River Delta Council serves as the representative of Hong Kong manufacturers to develop strong ties with the Mainland government authorities and provide comprehensive assistance and services to members for tapping the PRD market.

== Objectives ==
The objectives of the Federation are:

- to promote and foster the interests of Hong Kong's industrial and business communities
- to promote trade, investment, technological advancement, manpower development, and business opportunities in Hong Kong
- to represent business's views and advise the government on policies and legislation which affect business
