= Hope for Hong Kong =

Hope for Hong Kong 希望聯盟
- Founder: James Tien
- Founded: 15 March 2020
- Dissolved: 2021
- Split from: Liberal Party
- Ideology: Conservatism (HK); Centrism (HK)
- Colours: Green

Website
- Facebook's page

Hope for Hong Kong (Chinese: 希望聯盟) was a "middle-of-the road" political group founded by former Liberal Party leader James Tien who hoped to explore the moderate ground between the pro-democracy and pro-Beijing camps. It stopped operation after the delay of the 2020 election and the electoral overhaul in 2021.

== History ==
Amid the increasing polarisation of the Hong Kong politics after the 2014 Occupy protests and amid the 2019 anti-extradition protests, three moderate pro-Beijing figures "3JT", former Liberal Party leader James Tien who lost his seat on the Chinese People's Political Consultative Conference (CPPCC) because he asked for Chief Executive Leung Chun-ying to step down, former Financial Secretary John Tsang who failed to gain the Beijing government's support and lost to Carrie Lam in the 2017 Chief Executive election, and former Legislative Council President Jasper Tsang, explored the idea of forming a "middle-of-the road" political group.

The group was formed as a private company where five founders of the group were James Tien, Selina Chow, Miriam Lau, Felix Chung and Lam Man-kit, who all came from the Liberal Party, were also the company director. Tien criticised the Liberal Party leadership became too pro-Beijing and hoped for a more moderate approach.

The group planned to support former policy director of the New People's Party Derek Yuen and former chief manager of the China Technology Corporation Jason Poon to run in the 2020 Legislative Council election. However, the 2020 election was delayed for a year by the authorities, followed by the overhaul of electoral system imposed by the Chinese Government in 2021. The group is regarded as "dead" as Tien said the new political situation no longer requires a "critical minority" which rendered the Hope Alliance meaningless.

== See also ==
- Path of Democracy
- Third Side
- Professional Power
