= James Tien (politician) =

Hong Kong politician

James Tien Pei-chun GBS, OBE, JP
- 田北俊
- James Tien in 2017

Leader of the Liberal Party
- In office 21 May 2013 – 29 October 2014
- Chairperson: Selina Chow
- Preceded by: New post
- Succeeded by: Vincent Fang

Chairman of the Liberal Party
- In office 5 December 1998 – 8 September 2008
- Preceded by: Allen Lee
- Succeeded by: Miriam Lau

Member of the Legislative Council
- In office 1 October 2012 – 30 September 2016
- Preceded by: New seat
- Succeeded by: Eunice Yung
- Constituency: New Territories East
- In office 1 October 2004 – 30 September 2008
- Preceded by: Wong Sing-chi
- Succeeded by: Wong Sing-chi
- In office 1 July 1998 – 30 September 2004
- Preceded by: New parliament
- Succeeded by: Jeffrey Lam
- Constituency: Commercial (First)
- In office 28 June 1993 – 30 June 1997
- Preceded by: Stephen Cheong
- Succeeded by: Replaced by Provisional Legislative Council
- Constituency: Industrial (First)
- In office 12 October 1988 – 22 August 1991
- Appointed by: Sir David Wilson

Non-official Member of the Executive Council
- In office 1 July 2002 – 6 July 2003
- Appointed by: Tung Chee-hwa
- Preceded by: Henry Tang
- Succeeded by: Selina Chow

Member of the Chinese People's Political Consultative Conference
- In office March 2003 – 29 October 2014
- Chairman: Jia Qinglin; Yu Zhengsheng

Chairman of the Hong Kong Tourism Board
- In office 1 April 2007 – 1 April 2013
- Appointed by: Donald Tsang
- Preceded by: Selina Chow
- Succeeded by: Peter Lam

Personal details
- Born: 8 January 1947 (age 79) Shanghai, Republic of China
- Party: Liberal Party (1993–2022)
- Other political affiliations: Hope for Hong Kong (2020–2021)
- Spouse: Mary N. H.
- Relations: Michael Tien (brother)
- Children: Andrea; Calvin
- Parent: Francis Tien
- Education: Diocesan Boys' School; University of Illinois at Urbana–Champaign
- Occupation: Politician, entrepreneur

James Tien
- Chinese: 田北俊
Transcriptions
Standard Mandarin
- Hanyu Pinyin: Tián Běijùn
- Wade–Giles: T'ien^{2} Pei^{3}-chun^{4}
Yue: Cantonese
- Yale Romanization: Tìhn Bāk jeun
- Jyutping: Tin^{4} Bak^{1}zeon^{3}

James Tien Pei-chun, GBS, OBE, JP (Chinese: 田北俊; born 8 January 1947) is the former chairman and Leader of the Liberal Party (LP) and former member of the Legislative Council of Hong Kong (Legco). Originally an entrepreneur, he was also a non-official member of the Executive Council of Hong Kong (Exco), member of Central and Western and Kwai Tsing District Council and Hong Kong member to the Chinese People's Political Consultative Conference (CPPCC).

Son of the textile entrepreneur-turned-politician Francis Tien, James was appointed to public offices since the 1980s, where he sat on the Hong Kong Basic Law Consultative Committee (BLCC) and was appointed to the Legislative Council in 1988. He returned to the LegCo in 1993 through a by-election in the Industrial (First) functional constituency nominated by the Federation of Hong Kong Industries (FHKI).

He succeeded Allen Lee to become the chairman of the Liberal Party in 1998 and was appointed to the Executive Council by Chief Executive Tung Chee-hwa in 2002. His popularity rose to peak when he resigned from the ExCo in 2003 in opposition to the Basic Law Article 23 which brought down the proposed legislation. He ran a successful campaign in the 2004 LegCo geographical constituency direct election but was defeated in 2008 and resigned from his party offices.

He threw his weight behind Henry Tang in the 2012 Chief Executive election and had been critical of the eventual winner Leung Chun-ying after the election. His vocal opposition to Leung saw his CPPCC membership being stripped away, making him the first person in history to have received this sanction. He served one more term on the LegCo from 2012 to 2016.

== Early life and family ==
Tien was born in 1947 in Shanghai and moved to Hong Kong two years later with his family. His father, Francis Tien, was a successful clothing merchant, owning textile factories in Hong Kong and was appointed member of the Legislative Council and many consultative bodies for the colonial government in the 1960s and 70s. James Tien's younger brother Michael Tien owns the fashion chain G2000 and was chairman of the Kowloon-Canton Railway Corporation before it merged with the Mass Transit Railway Corporation.

He was educated at the Diocesan Boys' School. He traveled to the United States to study chemical engineering at the University of Illinois at Urbana–Champaign when he was 17 years old and met his wife Mary, a Vietnamese-Chinese, in college. In 1970, the couple returned to Hong Kong and he worked for his father in the factories.

== Political career ==
=== Early ventures and Legislative Councillor ===
He was first appointed member of the Kwai Tsing District Board in 1985 as a representative of the business sector as his factories were in Kwai Chung. He was appointed to the Hong Kong Basic Law Consultative Committee (BLCC) which oversaw the drafting of the post-1997 Hong Kong Basic Law in 1985. He was part of the Group of 89, the conservative faction of the Committee members consisting of mostly businessmen and professionals elites. In 1990, Tien joined the two pro-business conservative political groups, the Business and Professionals Federation of Hong Kong and the Liberal Democratic Federation of Hong Kong evolved out of the Group of 89.

He was first appointed to the Legislative Council in 1988, in which he served until 1991 when the first Legislative Council direct election was introduced in 1991. In 1993 when Stephen Cheong, member of the Legislative Council, representing the Industrial (First) functional constituency, died of heart attack, the Federation of Hong Kong Industries nominated Tien to replace Cheong. In 1993, he co-founded the pro-business Liberal Party which was established by the business sector in the legislature countering the liberal faction of the United Democrats of Hong Kong after its landslide victory in the 1991 Legislative Council election. In 1996, he was elected member of the Beijing-controlled Provisional Legislative Council, to counter the last colonial Legislative Council elected in 1995, making him one of the members of both Legislative Councils at the same time.

In the first SAR Legislative Council election in 1998, he ran in the Commercial (First) functional constituency representing Hong Kong General Chamber of Commerce's approximately 4,000 members. Tien was elected uncontestedly by the chamber. He became Chairman of the Liberal Party after the resignation of its first leader, Allen Lee, in December 1998 after Lee suffered his defeat in the New Territories East geographical constituency direct election.

He was also Chairman of the Hong Kong General Chamber of Commerce, a most influential chamber of commerce in Hong Kong between 1996 and 1997. He is also a general committee member of both the Hong Kong General Chamber of Commerce and the Federation of Hong Kong Industries.

=== Liberal Party Chairman and Executive Councillor ===
Tien joined the Executive Council, Chief Executive Tung Chee-hwa's cabinet, in July 2002 as Chairman of the Liberal Party, following the reorganisation of the Council under the new Principal Officials Accountability System of the Chief Executive. Although being the ally of the Tung administration, James Tien openly aired his displeasure of the skimpy political rewards meted out by Tung and advocated power sharing with the government. Tien was also a member of the National Committee of the Chinese People's Political Consultative Conference from 2003 until 2014.

After one year, on 6 July 2003, Tien announced his resignation from the Executive Council, when his calls to delay the controversial legislation of the Article 23 of the Basic Law were rejected after more than 500,000 people marched against the legislation. His resignation ultimately led to the withdrawal of the legislation and break-up of the "ruling alliance" of the Chief Executive, causing his popularity and that of the Liberal Party to surge. Capitalizing on the surge of popularity, Tien made his first attempt in the direct election by running in the New Territories East geographical constituency direct elections for the first time in the 2004 Legislative Council elections. In the 2005 Chief Executive election, the announcement that his ally Henry Tang had dropped out of the race was further bad news for the party. He initially said that he might stand for selection as Chief Executive, but ultimately did not. Donald Tsang was uncontestedly elected in the election. In 2007, Tien supported Tsang's second term. Tsang appointed Tien to be the Chairman of the Hong Kong Tourism Board after he was re-elected.

Tien lost his seat in the 2008 Legislative Council elections, when the Liberal Party lost all its geographical constituency seats, and he subsequently announced that he would not stand again for Legco. He also resigned as Chairman of the Liberal Party alongside Vice-chairwoman Selina Chow who lost her seat in New Territories West. After Tien's resignation, the Liberal Party was in the leadership crisis, as four of the seven Legislative Councillors quit the party over internal party disagreements. Miriam Lau eventually took over as chairwoman and Tien was made Honorary Chairman in December 2010 after another internal party struggle involved with his brother Michael Tien and Vice-chairman Tommy Cheung over the minimum wage legislation, which saw Michael quit the party as a result.

=== Second tenure in Legco ===
Tien threw his weight behind Henry Tang in the 2012 Chief Executive election. After it was clear that the Beijing authorities favoured Leung Chun-ying over Tang, Tien advocated his party to cast blank vote instead of voting for Leung. In September, Tien went back on his previous undertaking and successfully re-claimed the New Territories East seat in the 2012 Legislative Council elections. In May 2013, the party elected Tien to the new position of Leader of the Liberal Party.

Tien was one of the most vocal opponent of the Leung Chun-ying administration. During the 2014 Hong Kong protests, Tien called on Chief Executive Leung to resign, leading to the CPPCC hearing a call to eject him as a member. Tien was formally stripped of his post at the meeting on 29 October, making him the first person in history to have received this sanction. Tien stepped down from his position as the Leader of the Liberal Party after the removal.

In the 2016 Legislative Council election, James Tien ran a campaign against the second term of the Chief Executive Leung Chun-ying. He stood as a second candidate on his young party colleague Dominic Lee's ticket. The ticket gained 20,031 votes, around 3 per cent of the vote share and both of them were not elected. In the 2017 Chief Executive election, Tien again went against the tide, to support John Tsang whose candidacy was widely considered to be opposed by the Beijing government. He became the first member in the Election Committee to handed his nomination to Tsang. Tsang eventually received 365 votes, losing to Beijing-favoured Carrie Lam in the final election.

=== Post-Legco Life ===
After the 2019 Yuen Long attack, James Tien called for the resignation of Carrie Lam as Chief Executive for Hong Kong.

In 2020, Tien announced the formation of a new political group along with other members of the Liberal Party called Hope for Hong Kong. Tien stated that the group would aim to explore a moderate middle ground between the pro-Beijing and pro-democracy camps after accusing the Liberal Party's leadership of growing too close to Beijing. The group dissolved after the electoral overhaul.

== Controversies ==
On 11 October 2007, it was reported that Tien had accepted MTRC CEO Chow Chung-kong's sincere apology after the latter backed Civic Party barrister Tanya Chan Suk-chong against Liberal Party lawyer and incumbent Mark Lin Man-kit in the district council election for the Peak district.

Tien explained that Chow would have to bear all the political consequences for his choice of backing a rival party's candidate. Tien made clear that he was personally infuriated by Chow's unfriendly act despite the Liberal Party's loyalty and consistent support for the rail company. Tien further stated that the MTRC would face probable dissent from Liberal members in future matters involving MTRC inside district councils.

Tien backed down on 12 October 2007 by sincerely apologising to both Chow and the public.

== See also ==
- Michael Tien

Political offices
Preceded by Graham Cheng	Chairman of Hong Kong Productivity Council; 1989–1993	Succeeded by Kenneth Fang
Preceded by Louis Leung Wing-on	Member of Central and Western District Council; Representative for Peak; 2000–2003	Succeeded by Mark Lin
Preceded by Henry Tang	Non-official Member of Executive Council; 2002–2003	Succeeded by Selina Chow
Preceded by Selina Chow	Chairman of the Hong Kong Tourism Board; 2007–2013	Succeeded by Peter Lam
Legislative Council of Hong Kong
Preceded by Stephen Cheong	Member of Legislative Council; Representative for Industrial (First); 1993–1997	Replaced by Provisional Legislative Council
New parliament	Member of Provisional Legislative Council; 1997–1998	Replaced by Legislative Council
New parliament	Member of Legislative Council; Representative for Commercial (First); 1998–2004	Succeeded by Jeffrey Lam
Preceded by Wong Sing-chi	Member of Legislative Council; Representative for New Territories East; 2004–2008	Succeeded by Wong Sing-chi
New seat	Member of Legislative Council; Representative for New Territories East; 2012–2016	Succeeded by Eunice Yung
Preceded by Kenneth Ting	Senior Member in Legislative Council; 2004–2008	Succeeded by Albert Ho
Business positions
Preceded by William Fung	Chairman of the Hong Kong General Chamber of Commerce; 1996–1997	Succeeded by Peter Sutch
Party political offices
Preceded by Allen Lee	Chairperson of the Liberal Party; 1998–2008	Succeeded by Miriam Lau
New office	Leader of the Liberal Party; 2013–2014	Vacant Title next held by Vincent Fang
Order of precedence
Preceded by Stephen Ip; Recipients of the Gold Bauhinia Star	Hong Kong order of precedence Recipients of the Gold Bauhinia Star	Succeeded by Ambrose Lau; Recipients of the Gold Bauhinia Star
