= Victor Lo =

Dr. Victor Lo Chung-wing, GBM, GBS, OBE, JP (Chinese: 羅仲榮; born November 1950, Hong Kong) is the Chairman and Chief Executive of Gold Peak Technology Group.

He was Chairman of the Council of the Hong Kong Polytechnic University from 2004 to 2009. He was also a non-official member of Executive Council of Hong Kong from 2007 to 2009.

Lo is of Foshan ancestry.

Business positions
Preceded by Henry Tang	Chairman of Federation of Hong Kong Industries; 2001–2003	Succeeded by Andrew Leung
Order of precedence
Preceded by Chan Wing-kee; Recipients of the Gold Bauhinia Star	Hong Kong order of precedence Recipients of the Gold Bauhinia Star	Succeeded by Lap-Chee Tsui; Recipients of the Gold Bauhinia Star
