= Stephen Cheong =

Hong Kong businessman, entrepreneur and politician

Stephen Cheong Kam-cheun CBE, JP
- 張鑑泉

Member of the Legislative Council
- In office 2 December 1980 – 30 August 1985
- Appointed by: Murray MacLehose
- In office 30 October 1985 – 18 May 1993
- Succeeded by: James Tien
- Constituency: Industrial (First)

Personal details
- Born: 31 May 1941 Hong Kong
- Died: 18 May 1993 (aged 51) Hong Kong
- Spouse: Joan Tang
- Children: 4
- Education: La Salle College; Imperial College; London University
- Occupation: Managing Director

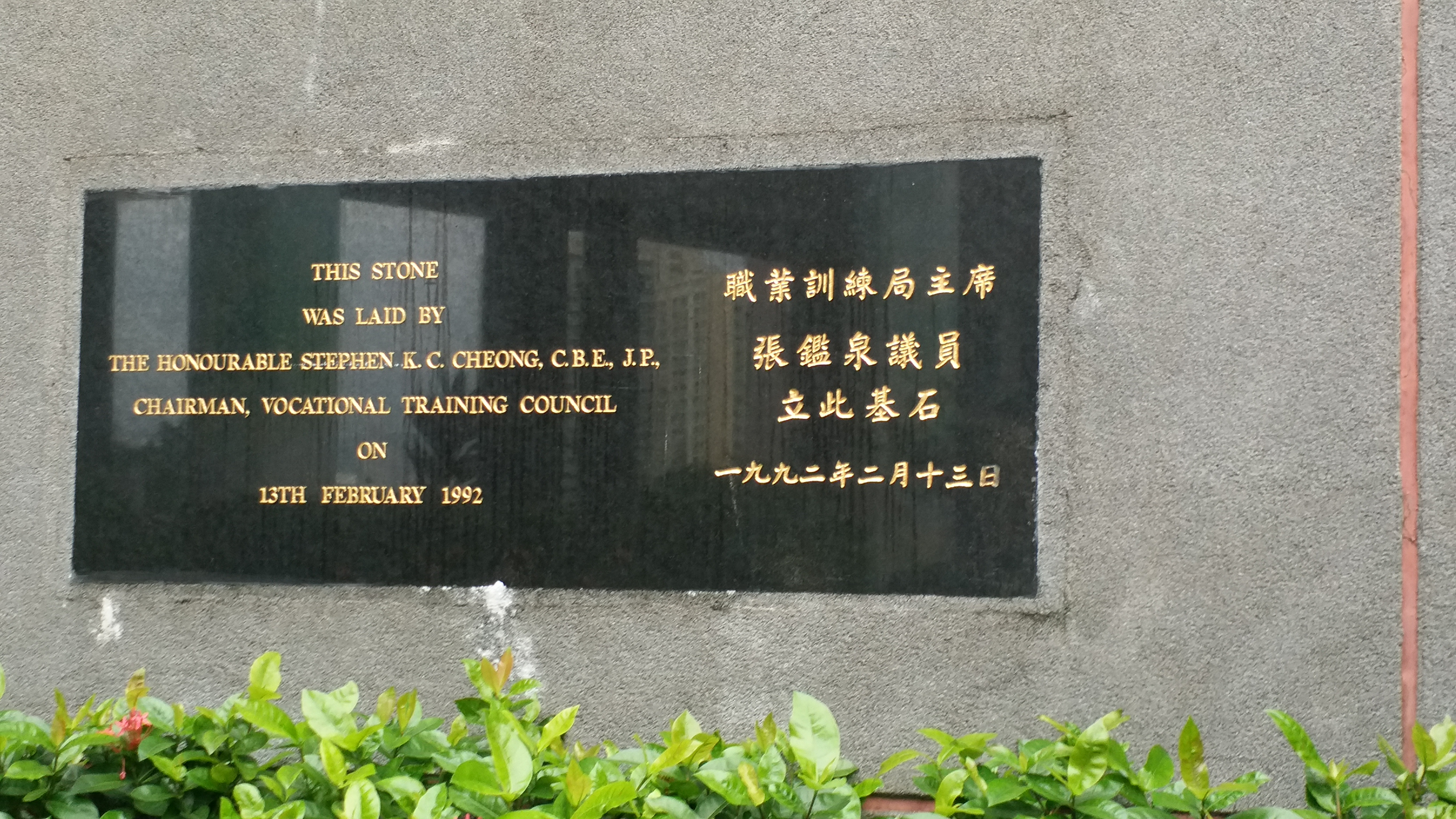
This stone was laid by Stephen K.C. Cheong, C.B.E., J.P., Chairman, Vocational Training Council, 1992

Stephen Cheong Kam-chuen, CBE, JP (Chinese: 張鑑泉; 31 May 1941 – 18 May 1993) was a Hong Kong industrialist and politician. He was a member of the Legislative Council of Hong Kong from 1980 to 1993 until his sudden death from a heart attack.

== Biography ==
He was born on 31 May 1941 in Hong Kong and was educated at the La Salle College. He obtained his Bachelor of Science in Engineering and Diploma of Imperial College from the Imperial College and Master of Philosophy from the London University.

After he returned to Hong Kong, he joined the textile industry and became the managing director of the Lee Wah Weaving Factory and Cheong's Textile Co.. He was member of the general committee of the Hong Kong General Chamber of Commerce and deputy chairman and chairman of the Federation of Hong Kong Industries, the two leading chambers of commerce in the colony.

He was appointed to various public posts, including chairman of the Transport Complaints Unit, member of Economic Review Committee, Hong Kong Export Credit Insurance Corporation Advisory Board, Hong Kong Industrial Estates Corporation, Public Accounts Committee, Transport Advisory Committee and UMELCO Police Group.

He was first appointed to the Legislative Council of Hong Kong in 1980. He was a leading representative of the business interests in the 1980s. In the first Legislative Council election in 1985, he represented the Federation of Hong Kong Industries to run uncontestedly in the First Industrial functional constituency. He opposed to the pro-democracy faction calling for the faster pace of democratisation during the 1988 Hong Kong electoral reform. He was the founding president of the Hong Kong Foundation, a conservative lobby group in the early 1990s.

He suddenly died on 18 May 1993 from a heart attack at the age of 51.
