= Kenneth Ting =

Hong Kong businessman

Kenneth Ting Woo-shou (simplified Chinese: 丁午寿; traditional Chinese: 丁午壽 is a Hong Kong–based businessman and industrialist. He has been the Managing Director and CEO of Kader Industrial Company Limited, a toys and plastics manufacturer, since its incorporation in 1989. Since 1993 he has been the company's chairman.

== Affiliations ==
He currently serves as chairman or honorary president of many public bodies, including:

- Federation of Hong Kong Industries
- Chinese Manufacturers' Association of Hong Kong
- Toys Manufacturers' Association of Hong Kong
- Hong Kong Plastics Manufacturers Association
- Non-Executive Director of the Mandatory Provident Fund Schemes Authority
- Member of the Manpower Development Committee of the Education and Manpower Bureau
- Former LegCo member (see Legislative Council minutes)

== Family ==
- Dr. Dennis Ting Hok-shou, brother
- Ivan Ting Tien-li, son
- Angie Ting Ho Wing Man, daughter-in-law
- Nancy Ting Wang Wan-sun, wife

== Awards ==
- Silver Bauhinia Star, 2004

Legislative Council of Hong Kong
New parliament	Member of Legislative Council; Representative for Industrial (First); 1998–2004	Succeeded by Andrew Leung
Preceded by Wong Siu-yee	Senior Member in Legislative Council; 1998–2004	Succeeded by James Tien
Business positions
Preceded by Andrew Leung	Chairman of Federation of Hong Kong Industries; 2004–2007	Succeeded by Clement Chen (politician)
