= Elmer Yuen =

Hong Kong pro-democracy activist (born 1949)

Elmer YUEN Gong-yi (袁弓夷)
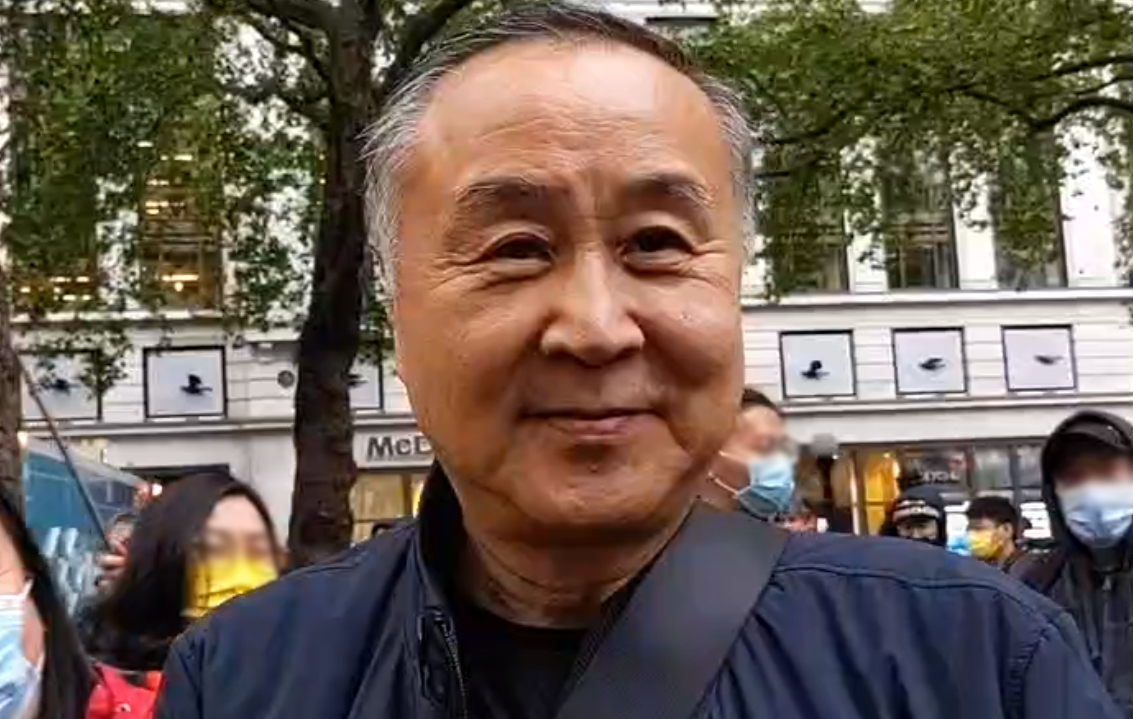
- Yuan Gongyi in London , UK (June 2021)
- Born: Yuan Su (袁肅); January 30, 1949 (age 77); Shanghai, China
- Occupations: Activist, current affairs commentator, YouTuber

YouTube information
- Channel: @袁爸爸袁弓夷政經評論
- Genre: Vlog
- Subscribers: 207 thousand
- Views: 89.4 million
- Last updated: 22 April 2025

Elmer YUEN Gong-yi (Chinese: 袁弓夷; born 30 January 1949) is a Chinese-born Japanese anti-communist activist, businessman, and current affairs commentator.

Elmer Yuen being interviewed on Voice of America Chinese in 2023

Yuan lobbied the US government to impose sanctions on China during Hong Kong's 2019-2020 anti-extradition bill protests. By 2022–2024, Yuan became wanted by Hong Kong authorities for establishing a "Hong Kong Provisional Parliament" in exile. Since 3 July 2023 Yuen has been wanted in Hong Kong for advocating for sanctions to be imposed on officials in the Hong Kong government and as an "Absconder in respect of Offences Endangering National Security." His Hong Kong passport was revoked in 2024 after meeting with US officials to discuss democracy issues.
