= Huang Xianzhang =

Qing dynasty politician and professor

Huang Xianzhang (simplified Chinese: 黄显章; traditional Chinese: 黃顯章; 1744–1817), courtesy name Dawen (traditional: 達文) and art name Pu Tingweng (traditional: 樸亭翁), was a native of Xinhui County, Guangdong Province. He was a politician of the Qing Dynasty, a fellow Jinshi, and a professor of Chaozhou Prefecture.

== Biography ==
=== Imperial Examination ===
In the fifty-third year of Emperor Qianlong's reign (1788), he passed in the provincial examination ranked 50th of Guangzhou Prefecture. On the 4th lunar month 25th day, in the first year of Emperor Jiaqing's reign (1796), he passed the imperial examination ranked 79th in the third class of Jinshi. On the 5th lunar month 3rd day, he was ordered to the imperial examination for conferment.

=== Politician ===
He initiated into the scholar-official class to serve in the Hanlin Academy and with the Ministry of Personnel as a county magistrate. In the fifth year of Emperor Jiaqing's reign (1800), he was appointed as professor at Chaozhou Prefecture, succeeding Yao Zhang (from Pingyuan). In the eighteenth year of Emperor Jiaqing's reign (1813), he retired from the long posting and returned to his hometown, and was succeeded by Cai Xueyuan (from Xin'an).

== Literary works ==
He has a poem in the collection of Xu GangZhou Yi Gao《续冈州遗稿》 at Harvard-Yenching Library, Harvard University. The proses were written in the Tong Nian Yun style (同年韵) of Chinese literature that involves matching rhyming words of every line

=== Calligraphy ===
At least 2 of his historical calligraphy work are displayed biange (匾額) on the heritage buildings at Longtou (traditional: 塱头村) village, Huadu District, Guangzhou. This is a cultural heritage protected site designated by the Guangdong Province. It is one of best conservation work to a historical village in Guangzhou and Foshan area. In 2014, it is designated as China national traditional village.

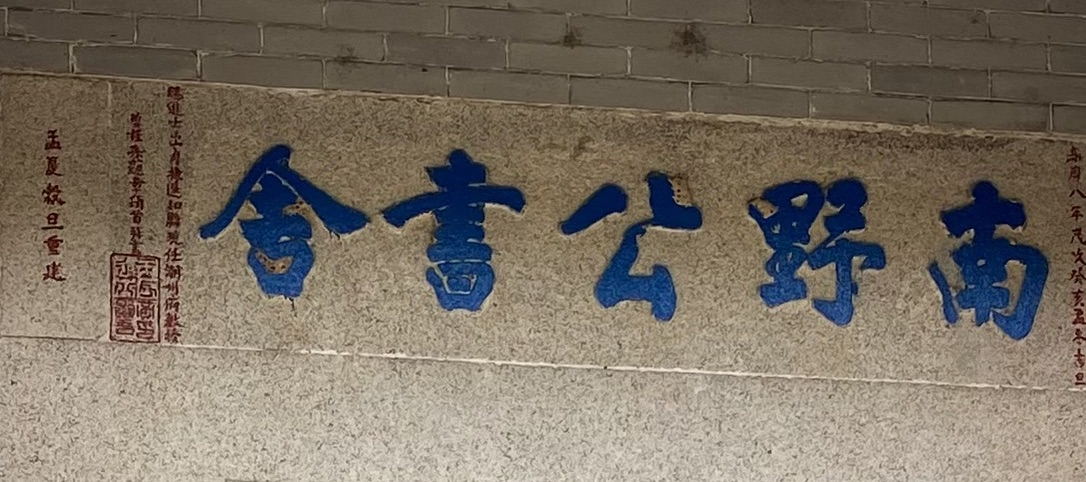
Located in Longzhong Community, Longtou Village. Built in the seventh year of Emperor Guangxu's reign in the Qing Dynasty (1881). Facing south, it has three rooms and two entrances, with a total width of 11.1 meters and a total depth of 12 meters, covering an area of 144 square meters. It has a gable roof, gray tiles, blue brick walls, and red mud bricks on the floor. Citation: Huang Xianzhang as a Jinshi and served as a professor in Chaozhou Prefecture.

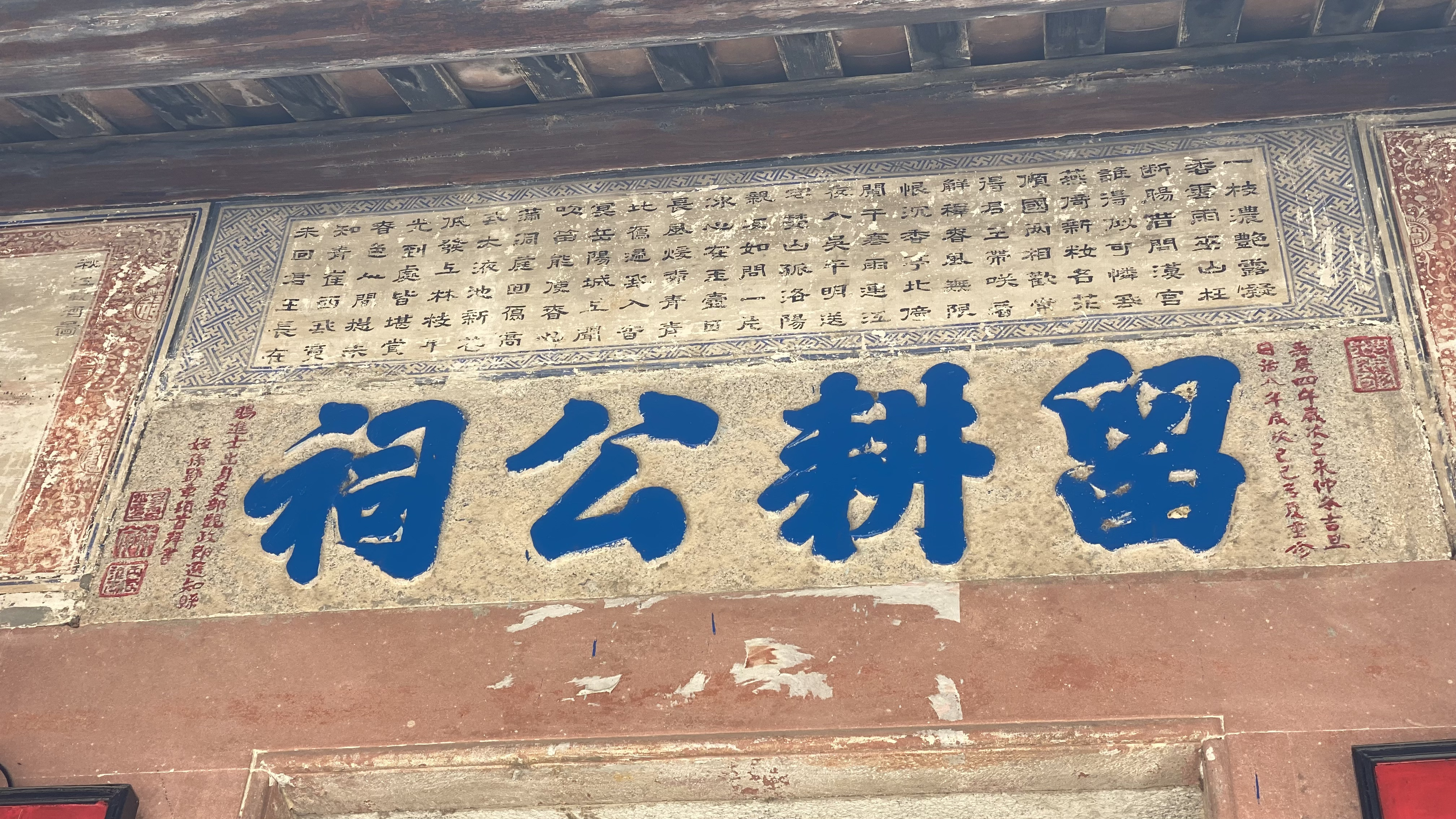
Liugeng ancestral hall is located at the ancient village of Longtou in Huadu District, Guangdong. It was built in the fourth year of Jiaqing in the Qing Dynasty (1799) and was announced as a cultural relic protection unit of Guangdong Province in December 2015. Citation: Huang Xianzhang as a Jinshi and served as a county magistrate in the Ministry of Personnel.
