= Hong Kong Productivity Council =

Hong Kong organisation to promote business

- Native name: 香港生產力促進局
- Type: Public Sector
- Founded: 1967; 59 years ago
- Headquarters: HKPC Building, 78 Tat Chee Avenue, Kowloon, Hong Kong
- Key people: Sunny TAN; Chairman; Mohamed Din Butt; Executive Director; Edmond Lai Shiao-bun; Chief Digital Officer; Lawrence Cheung Chi-chong; Chief Innovation Officer; Vivian Lin; Chief Operating Officer
- Number of employees: 800+
- Website: www.hkpc.org
- Footnotes; Data and information reference: Website of HKPC

Hong Kong Productivity Council
- Traditional Chinese: 香港生產力促進局
Transcriptions
Yue: Cantonese
- Yale Romanization: Hēung góng sāng cháan lihk chūk jeun guhk
- Jyutping: Hoeng^{1} gong^{2} sang^{1} caan^{2} lik^{6} cuk^{1} zeon^{3} guk^{6}

The Hong Kong Productivity Council (HKPC) is a multi-disciplinary organisation, established in 1967. It is tasked with promoting and assisting the Hong Kong business sectors.

HKPC’s headquarter is located at the HKPC Building at 78 Tat Chee Avenue, Kowloon, founded in 1990. HKPC is partially funded by the HKSAR Government, and the rest of incomes from services fees.

HKPC has established consulting subsidiaries in Shenzhen and Dongguan to serve Hong Kong–owned enterprises in the Mainland.

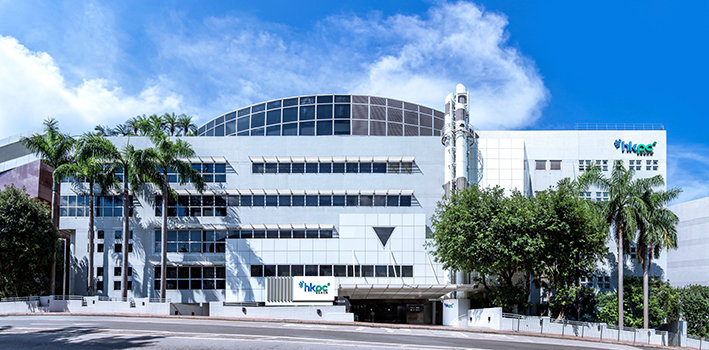
HKPC Building, located at 78 Tat Chee Avenue, Kowloon

== Governance ==
HKPC is governed by a Council with representatives from managerial, labour, academic, professional, and government departments concerned with productivity issues.

== Organisation structure ==
Digital Branch

- Digital Transformation Division
- Smart Manufacturing Division
- Robotics and Artificial Intelligence Division
- Mainland Division
- Commercialisation and Business Development Unit

Funding Scheme Branch

- Funding Schemes Division
- Technology Funding Division

Living Innovation Branch

- Automotive Platforms and Application Systems R&D Centre
- Green Living and Innovation Division
- InnoPreneur (SME & Startup Growth) and FutureSkills Division
- Smart City Division

Compliance and Internal Audit Office

Corporate Development Division

Council Secretariat

Finance and Procurement Division

Human Resources and Facility Management Division

== Services ==
- New Industrialisation
- IIoT
- A.I. & Robotics
- Novel Materials
- Advanced Manufacturing Technology
- Digital Transformation
- Smart Mobility
- Green Technology
- Food Technology
- GeronTech
- Corporate Sustainability
- Testing & Standards
- Cybersecurity
- FutureSkills & Talent Development
- Other services

== Subsidiaries ==
Hong Kong Subsidiaries

- HKPC Technology (Holdings) Company Limited
- Productivity (Holdings) Limited and Wholly Foreign Owned Enterprises in the GBA

Mainland Subsidiaries / Joint Venture Company

- Productivity (Dongguan) Consulting Company Limited
- Productivity (Shenzhen) Consulting Company Limited
- HKPC GBA FutureSkills Centre
- HKPC Shenzhen Innovation and Technology Centre (Futian)

== Office ==
Hong Kong headquarter: HKPC Building, 78 Tat Chee Avenue, Kowloon, Hong Kong

Mainland:

- Productivity (Dongguan) Consulting Co., Ltd: Room 208, Block 4, Creative Industry Park, NO.34 Guantai Road, Dongguan, Guangdong, PRC
- Productivity (Shenzhen) Consulting Co., Ltd: 18 Floor, Building 1, CFC Tower, No.5 Shihua Road, Futian Free Trade Zone, Shenzhen, PRC
