= Business and Professionals Federation of Hong Kong =

Think tank in Hong Kong

- 香港工商專業聯會
- Predecessor: Business and Professional Group of the Basic Law Consultative Committee
- Formation: 1990; 36 years ago
- Founder: Vincent Lo
- Type: Public policy think tank
- Headquarters: Suite 3706, Hopewell Centre, 183 Queen’s Road East, Wanchai, Hong Kong
- Region served: Hong Kong
- President: Peter Wong
- Chairman: Victor Apps

The Business and Professionals Federation of Hong Kong (Chinese: 香港工商專業聯會, abbreviated 工商專聯; BPF) is a non-partisan think tank in the Hong Kong Special Administrative Region of the People's Republic of China.

== Mission ==
The mission BPF is:

- to help enhance the competitiveness, long-term prosperity and stability of Hong Kong;
- to promote the continuous development of Hong Kong as a free, capitalist and international financial and business centre;
- to conduct in-depth studies on issues of strategic importance to Hong Kong's economic, social and political development; and
- to promote the importance of strong economic cooperation between Hong Kong and the Mainland.

== History ==
The BPF was founded in 1990 as a successor to the "Group of 89 members" of the Basic Law Consultative and Drafting Committees, a group of conservative business and professional leaders which opposed to faster pace of democraticsation. It maintained close relationship with other parties of business background, especially the Liberal Party.

Led by the pro-Beijing tycoon Vincent Lo, the Federation was against the then Governor Chris Patten's proposal of constitutional reforms for the Legislative Council which Beijing strongly opposed.
