= Public housing estates in Ho Man Tin =

Public housing in Ho Man Tin, Hong Kong

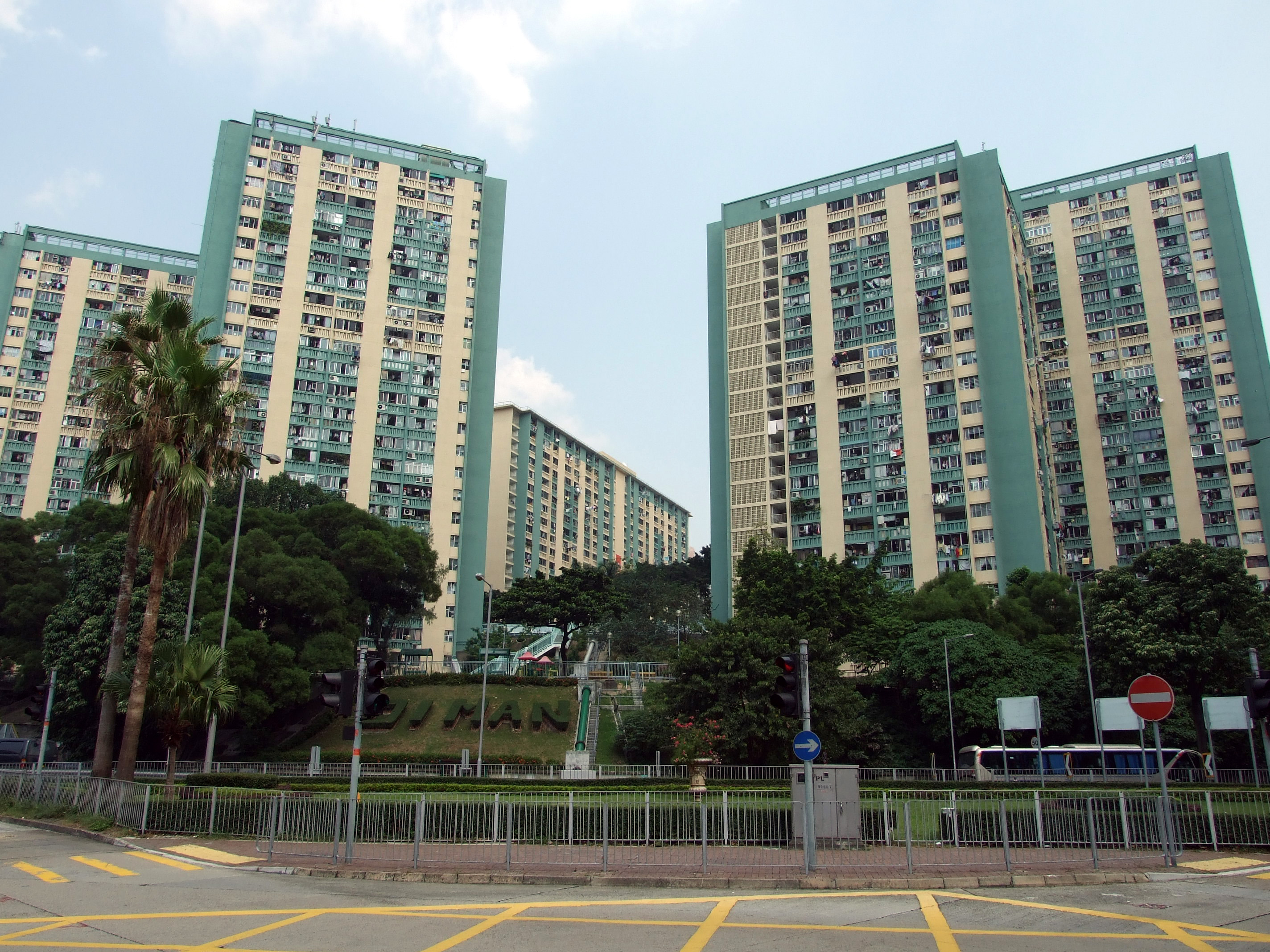
Oi Man Estate viewed from Princess Margaret Road.

The following is an overview of public housing estates in Quarry Hill and No. 12 Hill, Kowloon, Hong Kong, including Home Ownership Scheme (HOS), Private Sector Participation Scheme (PSPS), Sandwich Class Housing Scheme (SCHS), Flat-for-Sale Scheme (FFSS), and Tenants Purchase Scheme (TPS) estates.

== History ==
Before 1948, the population of Ho Man Tin mostly lived in squatter housing, which were usually temporary structures constructed with non-durable materials like wood and iron-zinc plates and asbestos roofings.

In 1948, Cottage Resettlement Areas (香港平房區）were introduced by the Hong Kong British Colonial Government in an attempt to reduce squatter housing. Four areas, including Ho Man Tin (Kings Park) were designated as Cottage Resettlement Areas. In these areas, the government provided basic utilities such as streetlights, a drainage system, communal fresh water supply, and communal toilets. In turn, re-settlers would have to fund and build standardized 13 by 13 feet housing units with materials abiding to the government's standards. By 1954, Ho Man Tin and Kings Park resettlement area had a population of 20,950 residents, and was the most populated Cottage Resettlement Area in Hong Kong. Non-profit organizations also played a key role in the expansion of Ho Man Tin's Cottage Area. For example, by mid 1956 the non-profit organization Hong Kong Settlers Housing Corporation (香港平民屋宇有限公司) have completed around 1500 cottages in Ho Man Tin, Tung Tau, Shek Shan, North Point and Chai Wan combined.

In 1958, the government began clearing some Cottage Resettlement Areas in order to free up land for constructing higher density multi-storey resettlement blocks, Ho Man Tin was one of the first areas to be cleared due to its prime location in the heart of Kowloon. Cottages were gradually replaced by public housing estates such as Oi Man Estate completed between 1974 and 1975.

== Overview ==
The Ho Man Tin Area consisting of Quarry Hill and No.12 Hill, has 8 housing estates in total: 3 Public Housing Estates managed by the Hong Kong Housing Authority, 4 Home Ownership Scheme (HOS) estates managed by the Hong Kong Housing Authority, and 1 Sandwich scheme housing estate managed by the Hong Kong Housing Society.

Name		Type	Inaug.	No Blocks	No Units	Notes
Cascades	欣圖軒	Sandwich	1999	4	712	HK Housing Society
Chun Man Court	俊民苑	HOS	1981	12	1,800	
Ho Man Tin Estate	何文田邨	Public	1998	9	4,738	
Kwun Fai Court	冠暉苑	HOS	1999	2	300	
Kwun Hei Court	冠熹苑	HOS	2000	1	796	
Kwun Tak Court	冠德苑	HOS	2019	3	603	
Oi Man Estate	愛民邨	Public	1974	12	6,289	
Sheung Lok Estate	常樂邨	Public	1998	1	358	

== Cascades ==
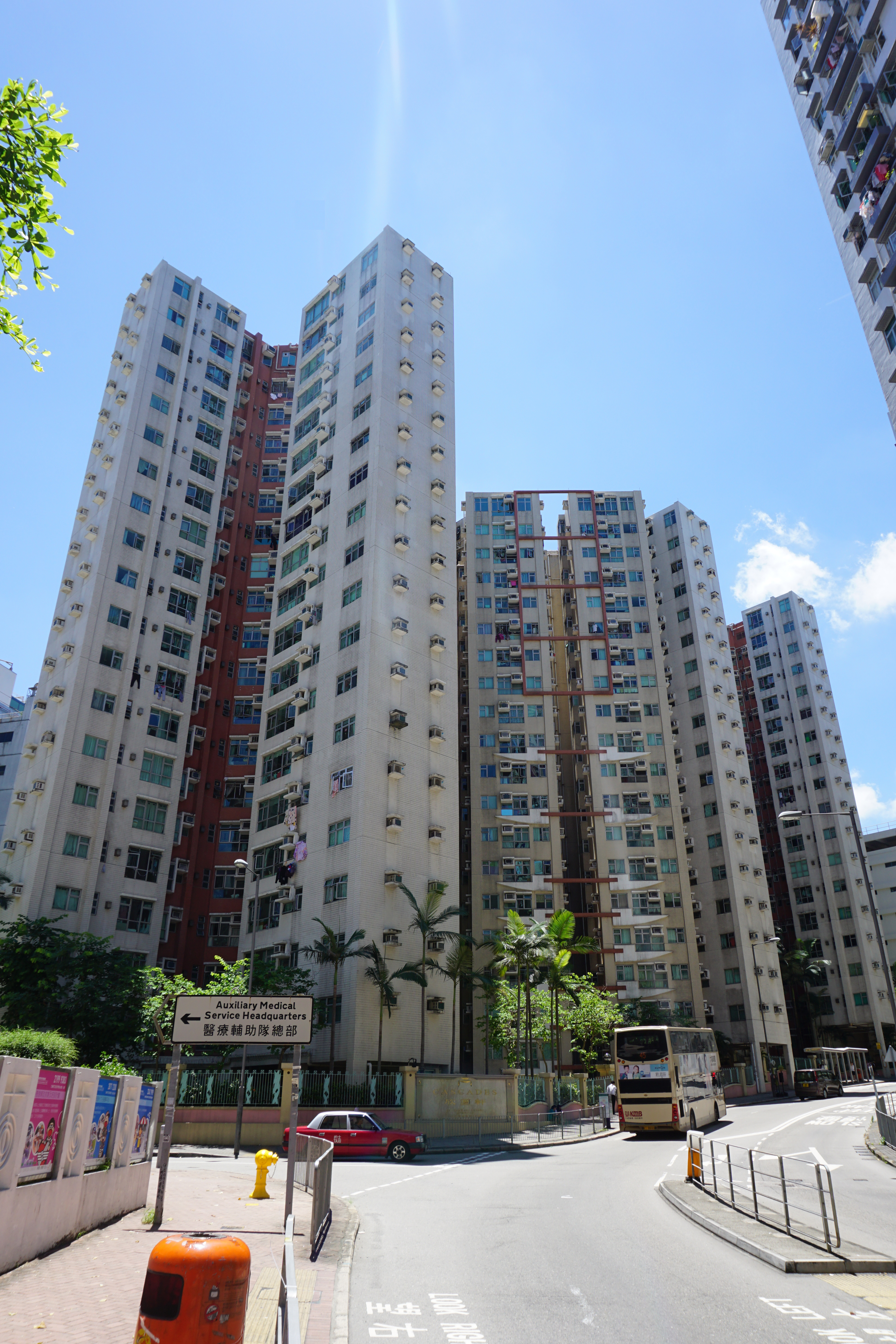
Cascades

Cascades (Chinese: 欣圖軒) is a Sandwich Class Housing Scheme estate developed by the Hong Kong Housing Society in Chung Hau Street, No. 12 Hill, Kowloon, Hong Kong. It is located near Chun Man Court, Ho Man Tin Estate, Ho Man Tin Government Offices, Hong Kong Metropolitan University and the Hong Kong Housing Authority Headquarters. It consists of four residential blocks completed in 1999 and offering 712 units. Cascades is located in Oi Man constituency of the Kowloon City District Council. It was formerly represented by Mak Sui-ki, who was elected in the 2019 elections until July 2021.

=== Houses ===
Name	Chinese name	Completed
Block 1	第1座	1999
Block 2	第2座	1999
Block 3	第3座	1999
Block 4	第4座	1999

Cascades is in Primary One Admission (POA) School Net 34. Within the school net are multiple aided schools (operated independently but funded with government money) and two government schools: Farm Road Government Primary School and Ma Tau Chung Government Primary School.

== Chun Man Court ==
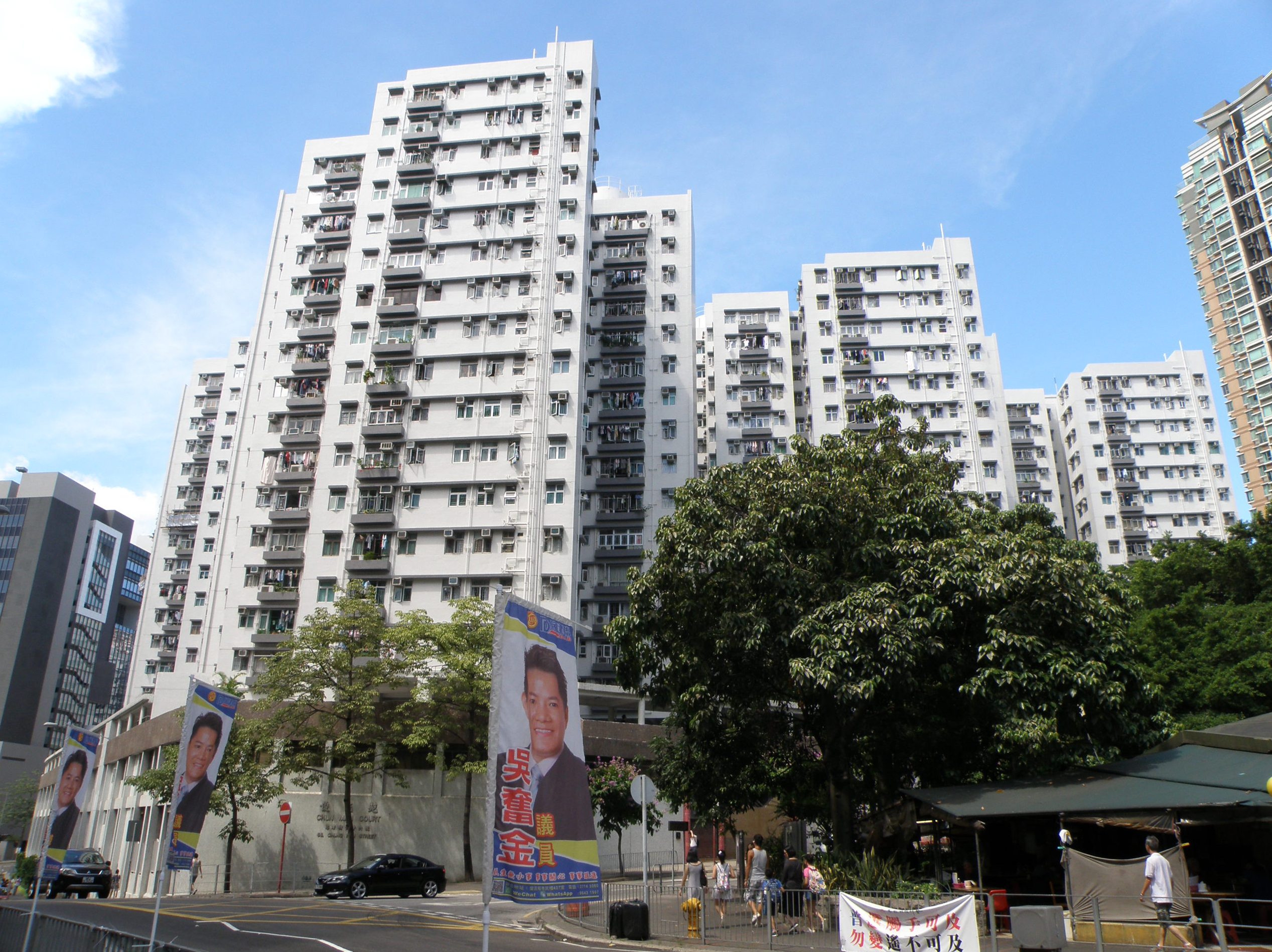
Chun Man Court

Chun Man Court (Chinese: 俊民苑) is a Home Ownership Scheme court on No. 12 Hill, near Oi Man Estate. It consists of 12 blocks built in 1981.

=== Houses ===
Name	Type	Completion
Man Fuk House	Non-Standard	1981
Man Pan House	Non-Standard	1981
Man Lan House	Non-Standard	1981
Man Hor House	Non-Standard	1981
Man Chung House	Non-Standard	1981
Man Hoi House	Non-Standard	1981
Man Hung House	Non-Standard	1981
Man Hei House	Non-Standard	1981
Man Ming House	Non-Standard	1981
Man Oi House	Non-Standard	1981
Man Shui House	Non-Standard	1981
Man Yin House	Non-Standard	1981

== Ho Man Tin Estate / Kwun Fai Court / Kwun Hei Court ==
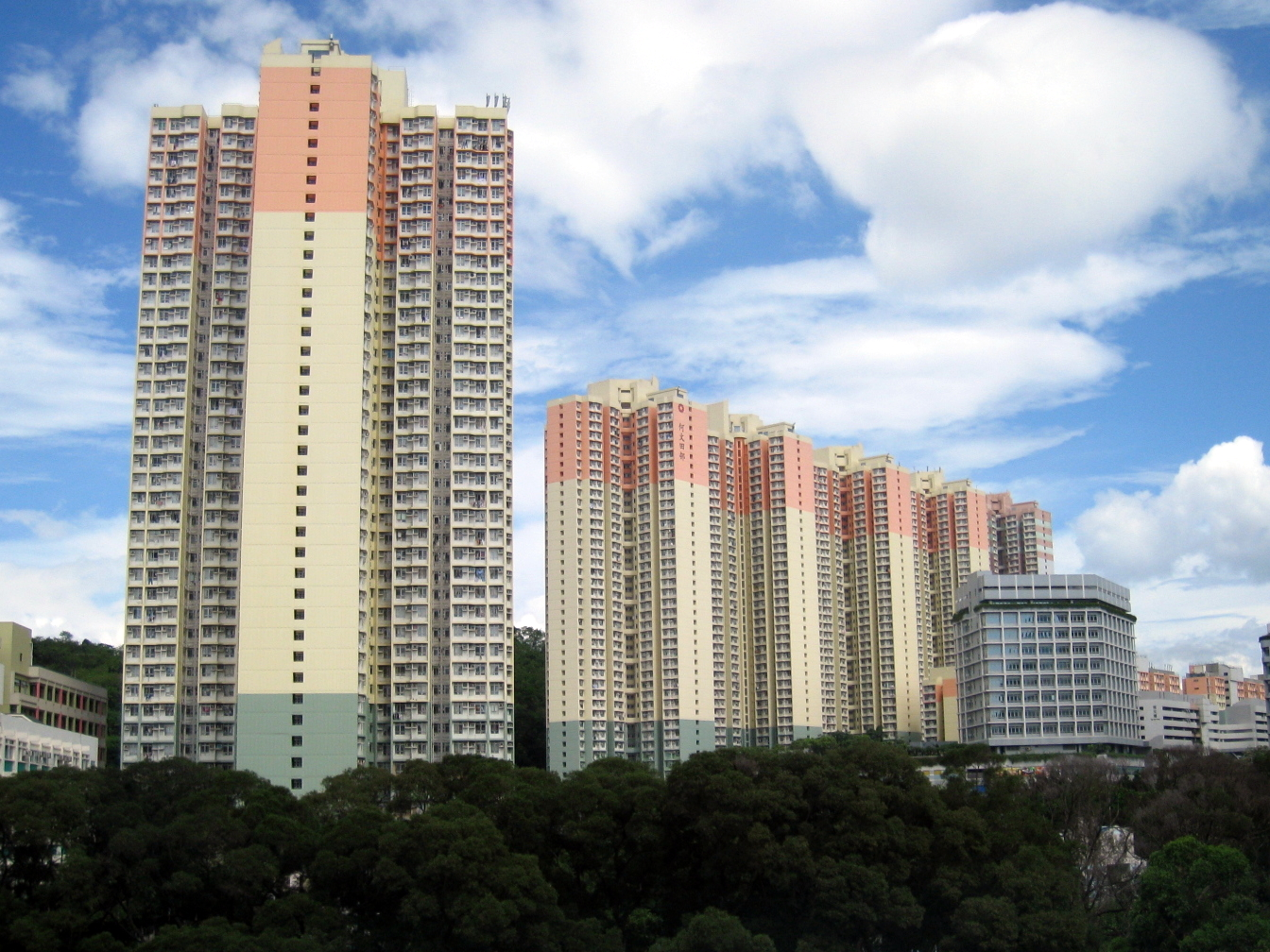
Ho Man Tin Estate

Ho Man Tin Estate (Chinese: 何文田邨) consists of 9 residential blocks and a shopping arcade, including 8 blocks and the shopping arcade of Ho Man Tin (South) Estate (Chinese: 何文田(南)邨) on Quarry Hill.

== Oi Man Estate ==
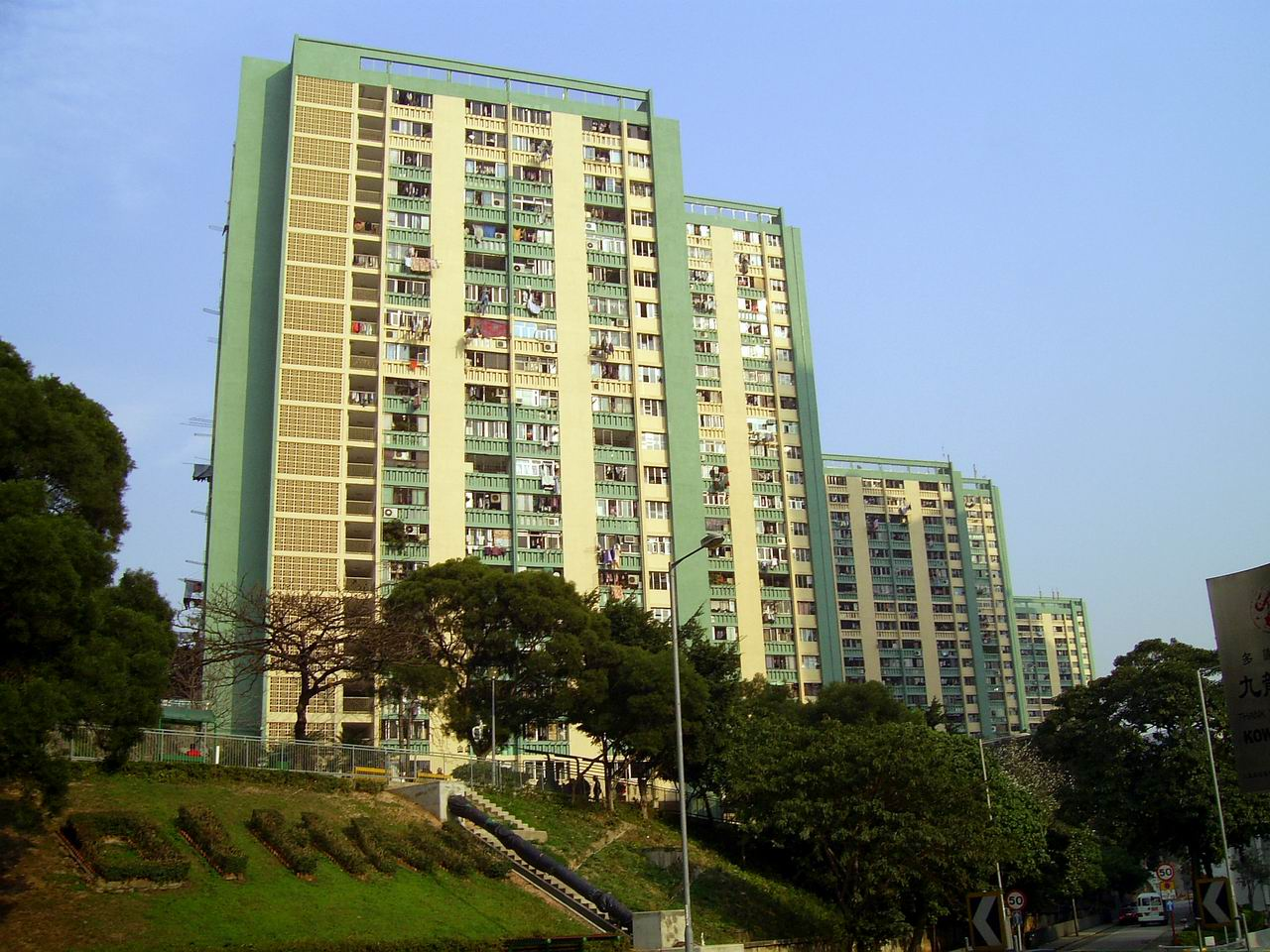
Oi Man Estate

Oi Man Estate (Chinese: 愛民邨) is a public housing estate on No. 12 Hill, Kowloon City District, Kowloon, Hong Kong. It is the largest public housing estate in Kowloon City District. It has a total of 12 residential blocks which were completed between 1974 and 1975. It was officially opened by the Acting Governor Sir Denys Roberts on 20 November 1975.

The estate was built at a cost of $186 million and comprises 6,200 flats designed to house some 46,000 residents based on the Housing Authority's former space allocation standards of 35 square feet per person. The "authorised population" of Oi Man Estate has since been revised to 18,900 residents. It was designed by Housing Department architects, and followed the 1970s estate design innovation of being planned as to "provide every convenience for its residents from banks, markets to barbershops." To this end the estate opened with a three-storey air-conditioned commercial complex, a market, and cooked food stalls.

The British Hong Kong Government admired the construction of the estate because its construction showed improvements in public housing standards in Hong Kong. Oi Man Estate was on the itinerary of Queen Elizabeth II when she visited Hong Kong in 1975. Leader of the British Conservative Party Margaret Thatcher also visited in 1977 and toured Tak Man House, commenting on the modern living conditions, cleanliness of the block, and the cool air circulating within the Twin Tower block's atrium.

=== Houses ===
English name	Chinese name	Type	Completion
Wai Man House	衛民樓	Twin Tower	1974–1975
Sun Man House	新民樓	Twin Tower	1974–1975
Tak Man House	德民樓	Twin Tower	1974–1975
Tun Man House	敦民樓	Twin Tower	1974–1975
Shun Man House	信民樓	Twin Tower	1974–1975
Chiu Man House	昭民樓	Old Slab	1974–1975
Chung Man House	頌民樓	Old Slab	1974–1975
Hong Man House	康民樓	Old Slab	1974–1975
Kin Man House	建民樓	Old Slab	1974–1975
Lai Man House	禮民樓	Old Slab	1974–1975
Po Man House	保民樓	Old Slab	1974–1975
Kar Man House	嘉民樓	Old Slab	1974–1975

== Sheung Lok Estate ==
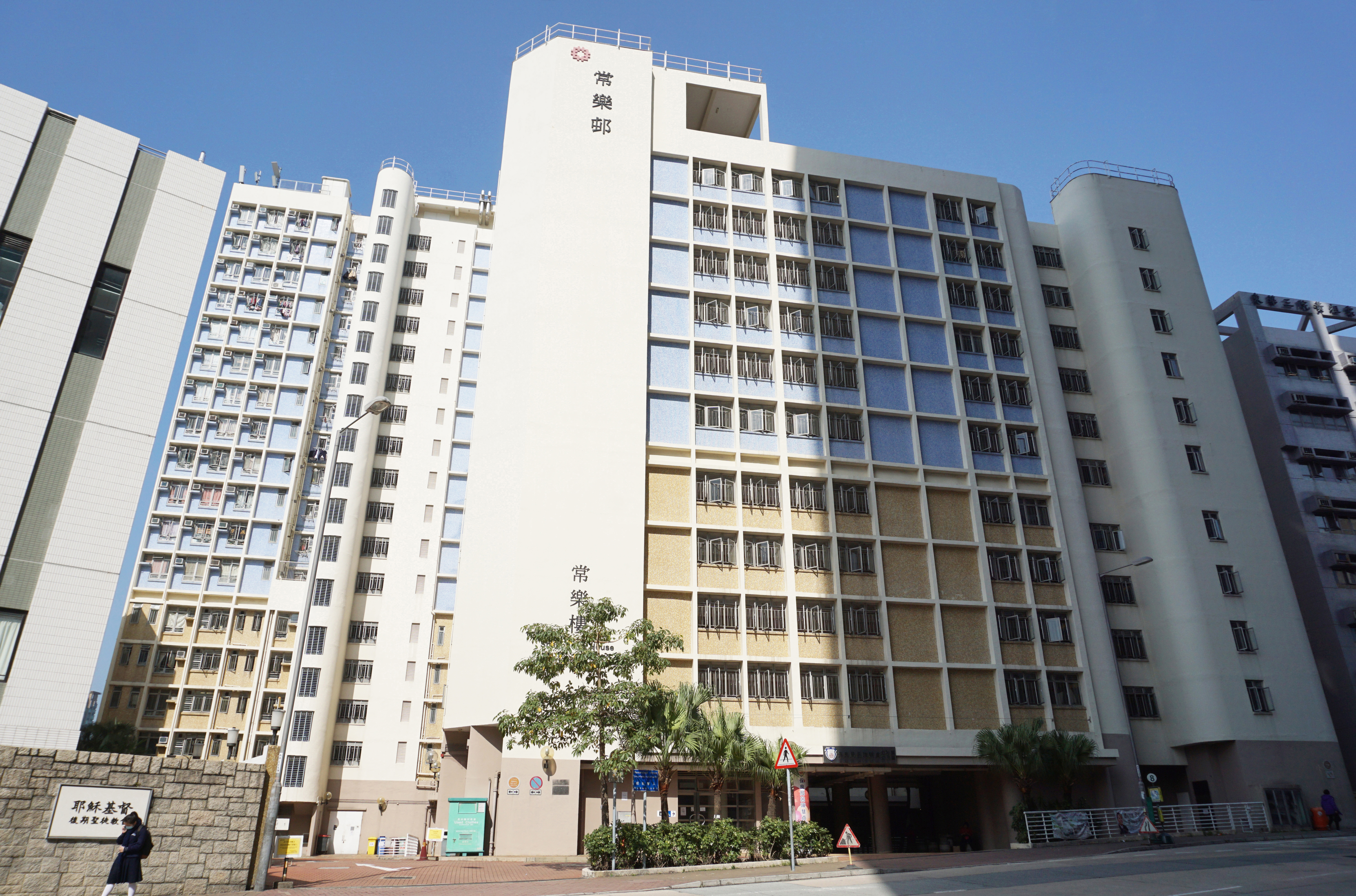
Sheung Lok Estate

Sheung Lok Estate (Chinese: 常樂邨) was built on the former site of Sheung Shing Street Temporary Housing Area, the estate has only one residential building built in 1998 on Quarry Hill.

=== House ===
Name	Type	Completion
Sheung Lok House	Small Household Block	1998
