= No. 12 Hill =

Hill in Hong Kong

Coordinates: 22.3126°N 114.1784°E

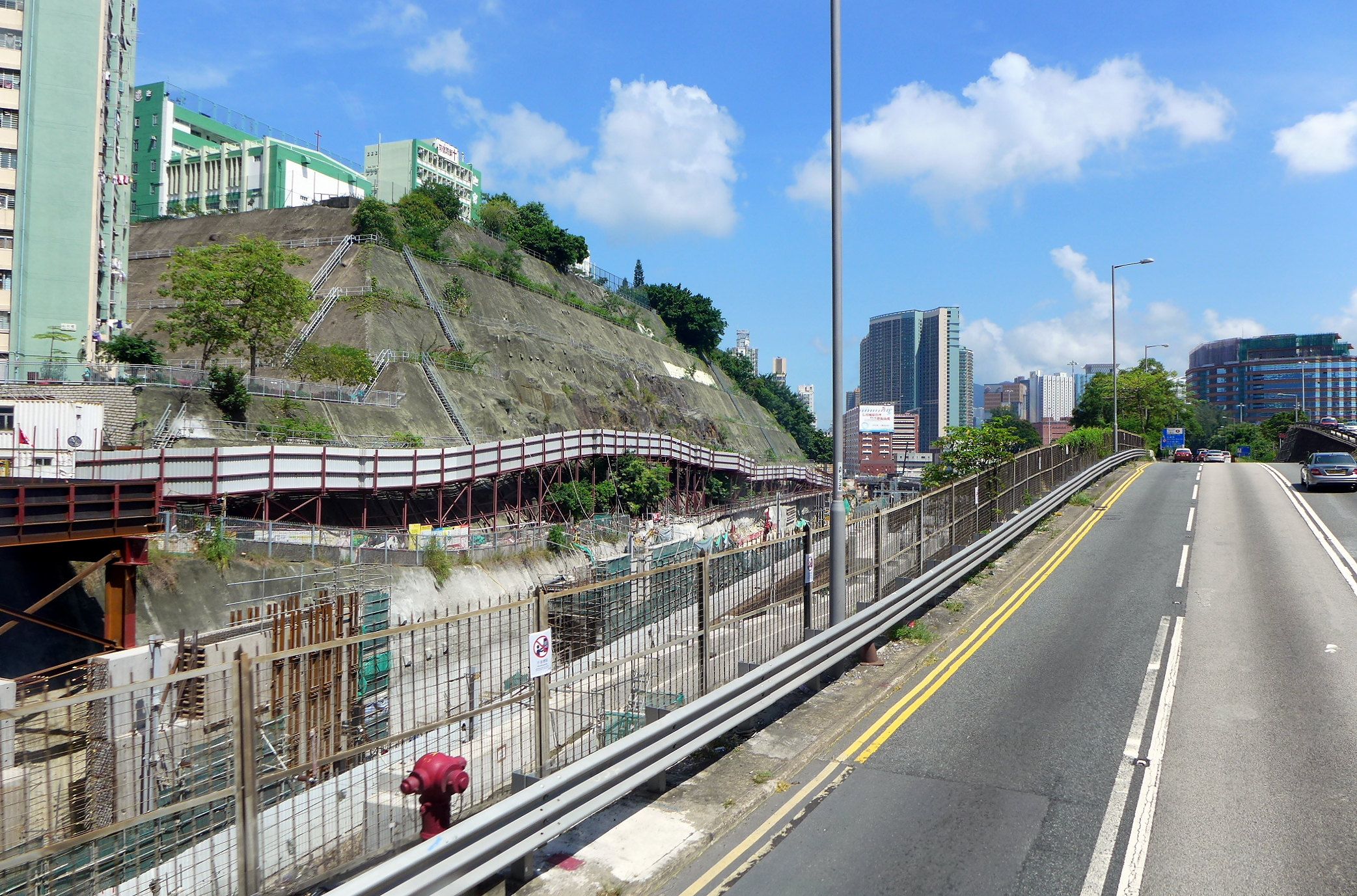
No. 12 Hill

No. 12 Hill (Chinese: 十二號山), or Hung Hom Hill (Chinese: 紅磡山), is a hill in Kowloon, Hong Kong, between King's Park and Lo Lung Hang, northwest of Hung Hom and southeast of Ho Man Tin. The Oi Man Estate was built on No. 12 Hill in stages between 1974 and 1975. The place is sometimes referred as King's Park Hill Level.

== Streets and places in No. 12 Hill ==
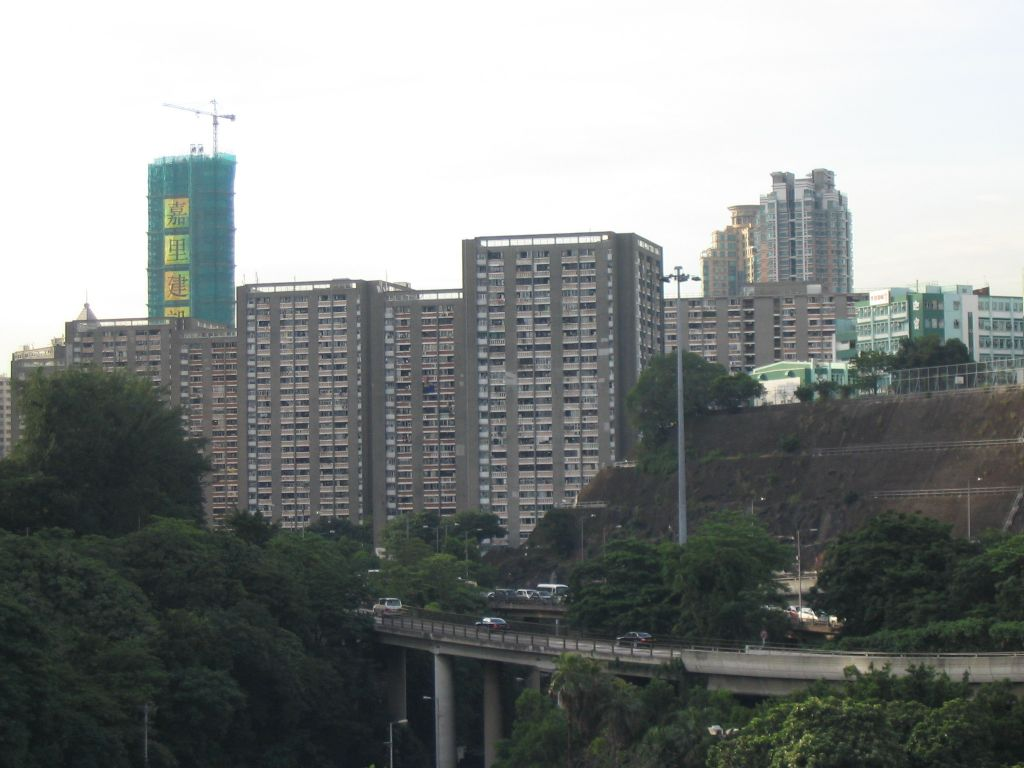
Oi Man Estate on No. 12 Hill. Carmel Secondary School can be seen on the right

Streets

- Carmel Village Street
- Chi Man Street
- Chung Hau Street
- Chung Yee Street
- Fat Kwong Street
- Good Shepherd Street
- Hau Man Street
- Oi Sen Path

Housing estates

- Cascades
- Chun Man Court
- Oi Man Estate

== Leisure facilities ==
- Fat Kwong Street Sport Centre
- Ho Man Tin Leisure Centre
- Ho Man Tin Park
- King's Park High Level Service Reservoir Playground
- Chung Yee Street Garden

== Public and community services ==
- Auxiliary Medical Services Headquarters
- Civil Engineering & Development Building
- Ho Man Tin Government Offices
- Hong Kong Housing Authority Headquarters
- Hung Hom Divisional Police Station
- Martha Boss Community Centre
- Society for the Prevention of Cruelty to Animals (Hong Kong) Kowloon Centre

== Education ==
Educational institutions in No. 12 Hill include:

- Carmel Secondary School
- Holy Trinity Church Secondary School
- Ling To Catholic Primary School
- Open University of Hong Kong (Main Campus)
- Sheng Kung Hui Tsoi Kung Po Secondary School

== Transportation ==
- Princess Margaret Road
- Oi Man Bus Terminus
- Ho Man Tin station

== See also ==
- List of mountains, peaks and hills in Hong Kong
