= STSS =

STSS can refer to:

- Short-track speed skating
- Social Theory and Social Structure
- Space Tracking and Surveillance System
- St. Teresa Secondary School
- Streptococcal toxic shock syndrome
