= Farm Road =

Farm Road may refer to:

- Farm to Market Road, in United States
- A residential street running from Patterson Plank Road to the Hackensack River in Secaucus, New Jersey
- Farm Road (Hong Kong) (農圃道), a street in Ho Man Tin, Hong Kong
