= St. Teresa Secondary School =

Secondary school in Ho Man Tin, Hong Kong

Coordinates: 22.3188°N 114.1802°E

- 21 Sheung Shing Street, Ho Man Tin, Kowloon, Hong Kong

Information
- Type: Secondary school for girls
- Motto: Age quod agis Chinese: 慎思明辨
- Established: 1978; 48 years ago
- Affiliation: Catholic Diocese of Hong Kong
- Website: www.stteresa.edu.hk

St. Teresa Secondary School
- Traditional Chinese: 德蘭中學
- Simplified Chinese: 德兰中学
Transcriptions
Standard Mandarin
- Hanyu Pinyin: Délán Zhōng Xué
Yue: Cantonese
- Jyutping: dak1 laan4 zung1 hok6

St. Teresa Secondary School (Chinese: 德蘭中學) is a Roman Catholic girls secondary school in Ho Man Tin, Kowloon, Hong Kong. It is directly governed by the Catholic Diocese of Hong Kong. The school's patroness is St. Teresa of Lisieux, since the school is located at the same district, Kowloon City District, as St. Teresa's Church in Hong Kong.

== History ==
The school's indirect predecessor is Precious Blood Golden Jubilee Secondary School, which was administered by the Sisters of the Precious Blood. In 1977, due to misusage of school funds and suspected corruption, some teachers contacted the ICAC and informed the students. It was followed by the diocese's take-over and suppression, a series of student protests and sit-ins, and eventually the closure of the school on 14 May 1978. St. Teresa Secondary School was opened on its former site, with the protestors initiating the secular Ng Yuk Secondary School.

During the SARS epidemic in Hong Kong in 2003, because students suspected of infection, the school arranged education psychologists in schools to provide psychological counselling for affected teachers and students.

In 2011, Ms. Teresa Tam took over as principal.

On 7 December 2016, at 7 o'clock in the morning, a staff member returned to the school's snack shop to start work. They found that the snack shop was messy and suspected of being burgled. Police officers arrived at the scene to investigate, and after counting the losses, about $2,000 was lost. Initially, it is not ruled out that the culprit took advantage of the middle of the night to climb a window on the side of the mountain and sneak into the campus to commit the crime. The case was classified as burglary for follow-up.

In 2017, for the 40th anniversary of the school, the school held the main protection ceremony thanksgiving festival, and set up the career planning room at the school.

On 9 September 2019, the human chain activity in the 2019–20 Hong Kong protests was launched. Students and alumni of various secondary schools in Hong Kong initiated the chain action to express their determination to fight for the five demands. The students of this school participated. The activity starts at about 7 o'clock in the morning and ends at about 8 o'clock. Among the 18 districts in Hong Kong, apart from the island district, the remaining 17 districts have middle school students and alumni involved in this operation.

Since 2020, the students in the school spent almost half of their high school career due to the COVID-19 pandemic in Hong Kong. Those students lamented that during the suspension of classes, the opportunity to meet with classmates and teachers was greatly reduced. In some days they could only attend physical classes for half a day, and the time they spent with their classmates was also reduced. They said that their parents were doing business in the Mainland China, and they were preparing for the Hong Kong Diploma of Secondary Education (HKDSE) examination in the school year. The epidemic has separated them from two places. They can only gossip through the screen every weekend. They didn't have close relatives or teachers to accompany and supervise them. During the Chinese New Year, the epidemic still isolates them from their relatives. As a result, those students felt very lonely. Those girls faced the DSE alone.

On 25 June 2021, one of the distinguished contemporary Chinese scientists gave a public lecture at school. It was lectured by Zhang Xi, a scientist of the Chang'e 4 probe project, entitled "Building Dreams on the Moon and Comfortable Sleeves". Zhang Xi was communicating with students at the school. In an interview with Hong Kong Commercial Daily, she said that there is no gender distinction in the work of aerospace, and women can also do well, but they may have relatively little time to take care of their families. She hoped that the students can also work hard in this direction.

On 26 April 2022 at about 8 pm, a female student was found on the school's rooftop, in the dark. She was suspected of trying to jump off the building. Police arrived after receiving the report and confirmed that the student belonged to the school. They persuaded the other party, and took the student to a safe place; she was sent to the hospital. At the time, the school was being used as a venue for the Hong Kong Diploma of Secondary Education examination and there were no classes. The police are investigating the cause of the nighttime incident.

== Campus environment ==
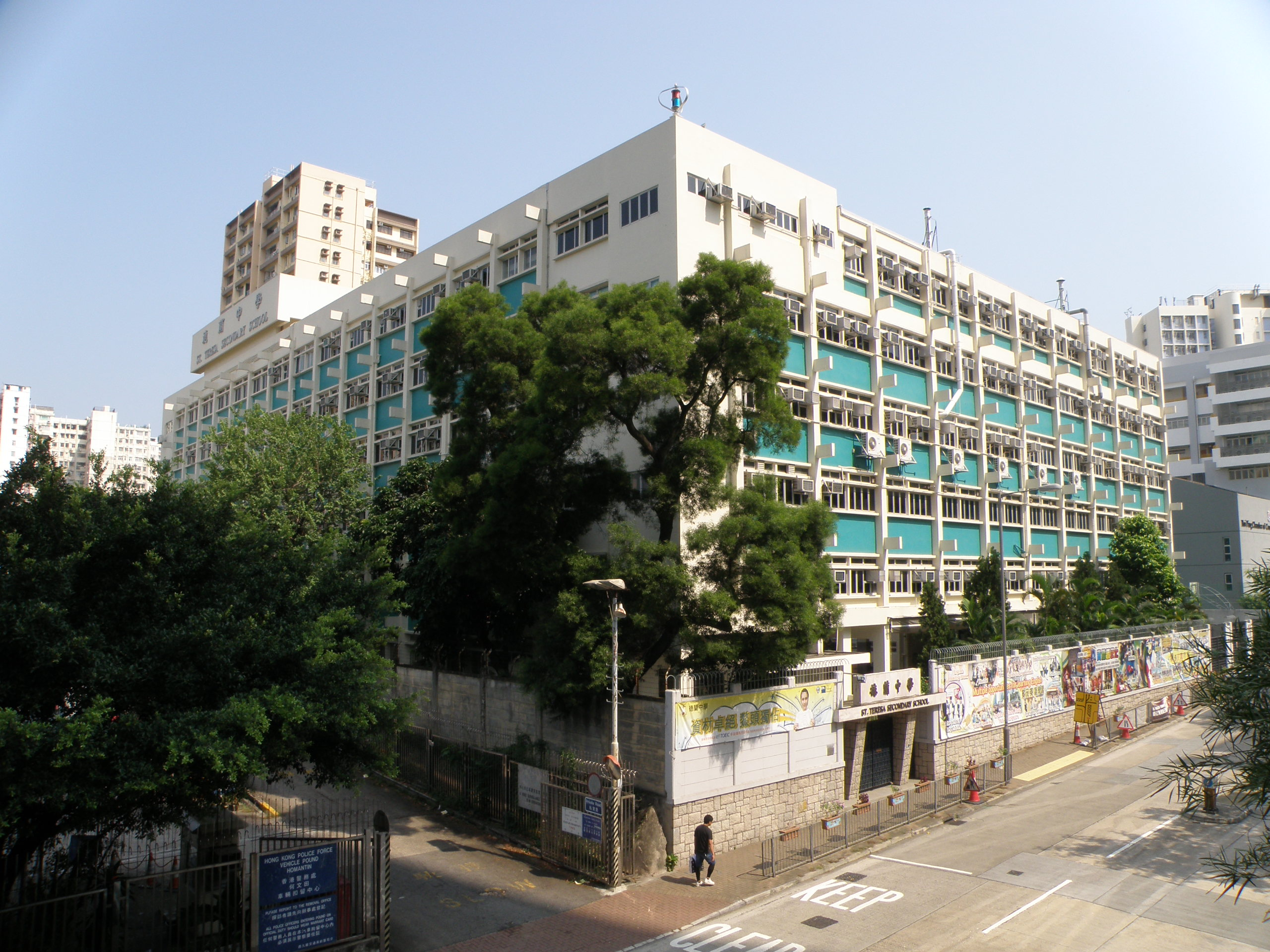
Campus view

St. Teresa Secondary School is located on a section of Sheung Shing Street between Pui Ching Road and Shek Ku Street in Ho Man Tin, Kowloon. It is adjacent to the Hoi Ping Chamber of Commerce Secondary School and is adjacent to Ho Man Tin Plaza, the Open University of Hong Kong and a luxury mansion.

The school consists of four buildings. The southwest is a teaching building. It contains a school office, a teacher's office, a library, and six classrooms on each floor. Each classroom has a projector and an electronic white board; the southeast is a special room building, including the Creative Media Lab, Maker Space, Technology and Living Room and four laboratories. The northeastern side is a new wing, which contains a student activity room, an indoor rowing hall and a computer room, is connected to the two old wings, and consists of an elevator; the northwest is an independent auditorium with a lecture hall. There is a farmhouse next to the auditorium. Four buildings surround a playground with two basketball courts. In the campus, the statue of St. Teresa of Lisieux was erected.

The school laid a wireless network. The creative media lab is built with Apple Inc.'s iMac. Maker Space is established, allowing students to conduct scientific inquiry activities. An on-campus notification system is developed, which is made up of LEDs and linked with a PHP website.

== School characteristics ==
=== School spirit ===
St. Teresa Secondary School is a traditional girls school. Families who wish to attend the school believe that their school's spirit is calm and honest.

The school encourages students to perform better by using praise cheques. A student will receive a praise cheque if she meets one of the following criteria: getting five or more marks in a test compared to the previous one, being one of the top 3 students in a test; or thinking critically, being responsible, having charisma, being neat and tidy, showing improved behaviour, being honest by returning any lost item found, being helpful, being righteous, being active in services, or having active participation in activities.

=== Areas of learning ===
The school organises a sports day at the Wan Chai Sports Ground on Hong Kong Island every autumn. In the sports competition, students use iPads to measure and record in the competitions.

The students of the school have won awards in fine arts, track and field, basketball, dance, diving and flower arrangement. The school's dance group, choir, and orchestra have been invited by different agencies to perform outside the school or even abroad.

The school organises overseas study each year. Students travelled to the United Kingdom, Australia, New Zealand, France, the Czech Republic, Singapore, Taiwan, mainland China etc. There are leadership training and business practice programmes.

=== STREAM education ===
Students are encouraged to study STEM subjects, which cultivate their spirit of scientific inquiry. The implementation of STEM education utilities the adjustment of curriculum, use of resources from the Education Bureau, and programming activities, allowing students to learn basic STEM knowledge, and arise the interest in those subjects. Students use the knowledge across the curriculum for STEM inquiry, map analysis and discussion of climate change etc.

In response to the characteristics of girls who love art creation, visual arts is merged to the school-based curriculum, further expanding STEM to STEAM. With the integration of reading and religious elements in the STEAM education, a STREAM course suitable for girls was developed, allowing them to learn analytical skills from reading reports. While the school implemented STREAM education, it was selected by the Education Bureau as a pilot school and conducted video recordings for future sharing.

Students' works like App inventions obtained awards from the competitions hosted by Microsoft, Hong Kong Polytechnic University, University of Hong Kong, Hong Kong Observatory, Education Bureau, Electrical and Mechanical Services Department, Hong Kong Science and Technology Parks, Hong Kong Science Park Big Data Studio, and Hong Kong Police Force etc.

=== Language policy ===
Mathematics, junior science, physics, chemistry, biology, business, etc. are taught in English, whereas sports, music, visual arts, and religious education are taught in Chinese.

The school's Chinese and English subjects include drama sessions which train students' logical thinking, creativity and oral presentation skills. Students obtained awards in drama, English poetry and debating competitions.

The school also has courses teaching French, Spanish, Japanese and Korean.

=== Enhancement and remedial classes ===
Some students were nominated to attend the gifted courses organized by the Education Bureau and the Hong Kong Academy for Gifted Education. Some Form 6 students obtained the Home Affairs Bureau's scholarships, equivalence to four-year university's tuition fees.

In terms of academics, the school holds summer bridging courses to establish students' habits of preparatory studies and autonomous learning.

=== Teaching team ===
The teaching skills of the teachers were demonstrated in the external school review (ESR) held by the Education Bureau (EDB), with a recording of the lessons for the professional training of teachers in Hong Kong at the EDB seminars. Disciplines include English, Mathematics, Science, career planning, school ethos, student support, school-based textbook design and curriculum planning. There is also teacher of the Hong Kong FlippEducators Association who serve in the school and implement Flipped classroom.

The teaching team also organized competitions on different subjects and invited primary schools in Kowloon City District and Yau Tsim Mong District to participate.

== Class structure ==
In St. Teresa Secondary School, there are four classes in F.1 through F.6, some of which are split into smaller groups.

All classes are named after Confucian or Christian virtues, which are: Love (愛), Filial Devotion (孝), Respect for elder brothers (悌) and Loyalty (忠). Before 2015, there were six classes in each form, and thus Honesty (信) and Ritual (禮) were also used.

== House system ==
Recently the four houses in St. Teresa Secondary School are named after Catholic saints. From 2016 to present, the houses are St. Agnes House, St. Cecilia House, St. Catherine House (named for Saint Catherine of Sweden) and St. Faustina House.

== Famous or outstanding alumni ==
- Quenby Fung: Well-known youth and children's literary writer
- Wan Kin Yee: A member of the Hong Kong Track and Field team and a number of local track record holders
- Jo Kuk: Hong Kong actress
- Miss Yellow: Hong Kong actress
- Kwok Ting Ting: CFO of Chanel Limited and Director of Business Solutions in Asia Pacific
- Chan Wai Chi: Hong Kong Disneyland Gardening Service Manager
- Yeung Wai Ling: Coach of Hong Kong Rhythmic Gymnastics Team
- Ho Ching Ching: Hong Kong female singer and dubber
- Lily Ho Ngo Yee: Hong Kong actress and former Miss Hong Kong 2007 contestant
- Phoebe Sin: Hong Kong TV female artist, Miss Hong Kong 2016 contestant top 10
- Leanne Ho: Advertising model
- Sarah Chan: Advertising model

== See also ==
- St. Teresa's Church
- Ho Man Tin
- Quarry Hill, Hong Kong
- Kowloon City District
- Catholic Diocese of Hong Kong
- Education in Hong Kong
- List of secondary schools in Hong Kong
