= Stamford American School Hong Kong =

International school in Hong Kong

- (Ho Man Tin Campus) 25 Man Fuk Road, Ho Man Tin, Kowloon (West Kowloon Campus) G/F to 2/F, Imperial Cullinan, 10 Hoi Fai Road, Tai Kok Tsui, Kowloon

Information
- Type: Private School
- Established: 2017
- Head of school: Andrew Noakes
- Grades: Pre-primary to Grade 12
- Gender: Co-educational
- Curriculum: IB and American
- Website: sais.edu.hk

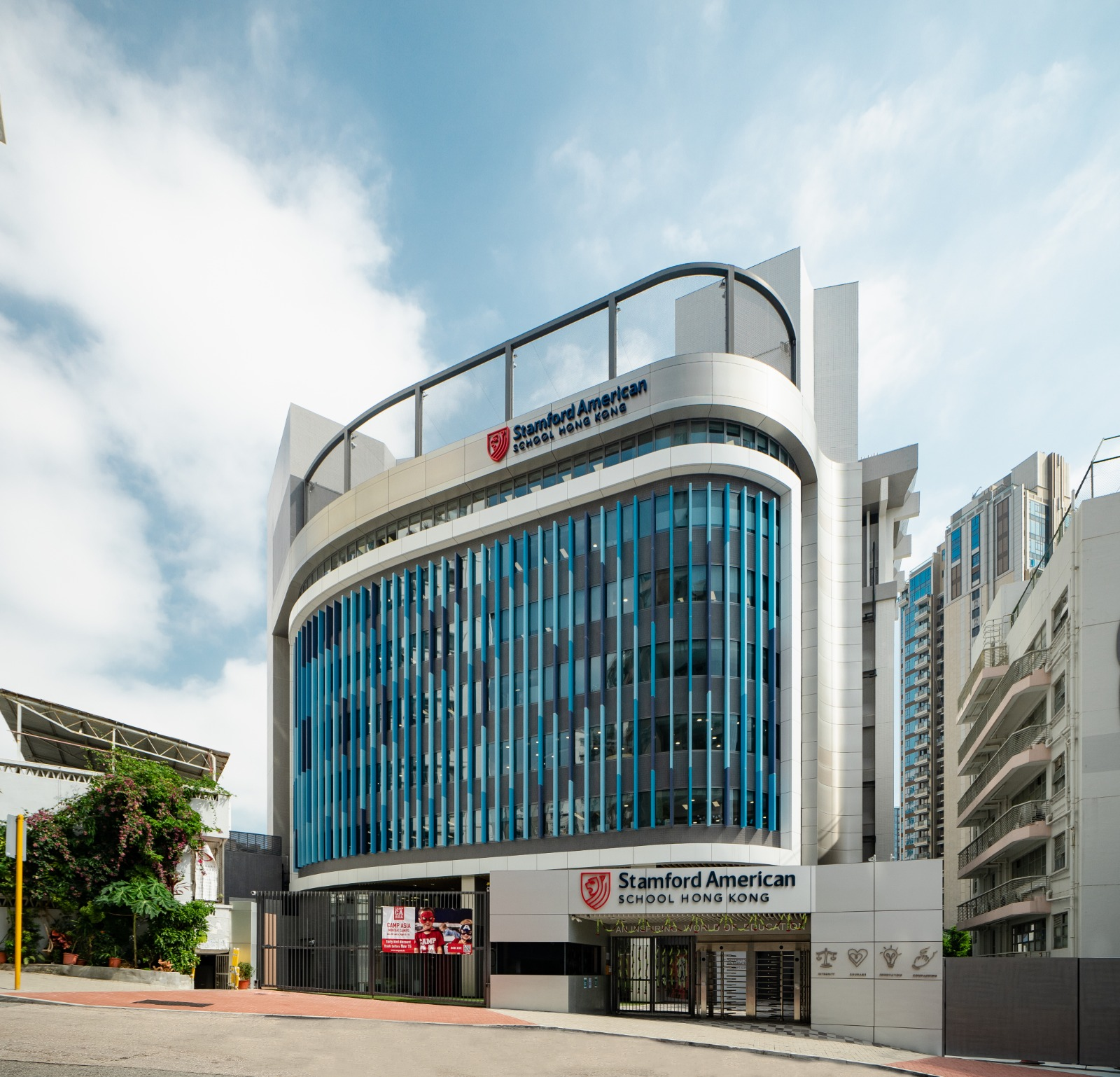
Stamford American School Hong Kong (Ho Man Tin Campus)

Stamford American School Hong Kong is a private school in Hong Kong that offers K-12 international educational program with American standards-based curriculum for over 1000 students from more than 28 nationalities in Ho Man Tin and Tai Kok Tsui,Kowloon. Opened in 2017, Stamford offers Pre-Primary to Grade 12 for students aged 5 to 18. Stamford is authorized to offer International Baccalaureate (IB) Diploma Programme (DP) and is an authorized IB World School . Stamford American School Hong Kong is also a Council of International Schools (CIS) and Western Association of Schools and Colleges (WASC) Accredited School.

== History ==
Stamford American School Hong Kong was established in August 2016 by Cognita and welcomed its first cohort of students in September 2017. In its foundation year, Stamford enrolled more than 350 students, marking a strong beginning for the school community.

In 2018, Stamford announced a comprehensive on-campus facilities enhancement project at its Ho Man Tin campus to support its continued growth and development. The project was successfully completed in 2021, further strengthening the school’s learning environment.

On March 19, 2025, Stamford announced the expansion of its world-class educational offerings with the launch of a proposed second campus in West Kowloon. Strategically located in the vibrant Olympic district, the new harborfront campus features purpose-built pre-university learning spaces and opened in October 2025, further enhancing Stamford’s commitment to delivering exceptional education in Hong Kong.

== Campus ==
Stamford American School Hong Kong took over the former premises of New Method College on 25 Man Fuk Road, Ho Man Tin, Kowloon, Hong Kong as its campus. The school was refurbished before opening and fitted with new facilities including a swimming pool and a technology lab.

On October 13, 2025, the new High School campus opened at 10 Hoi Fai Road in Imperial Cullinan. This was previously the campus of Dalton School.
