= Oi Man Estate =

Public housing estate in No. 12 Hill, Hong Kong

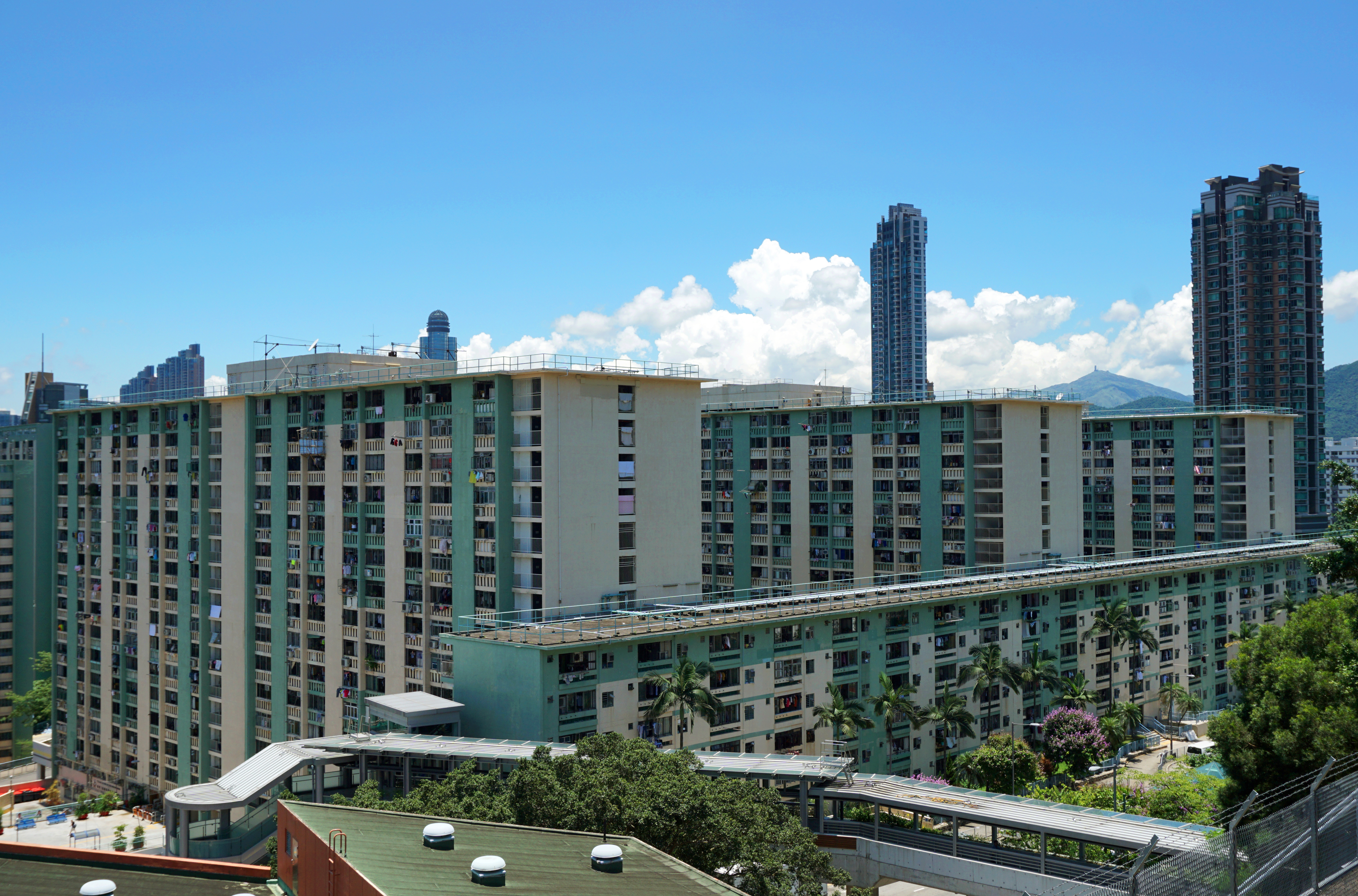
- Old Slab buildings of Oi Man Estate
- Interactive map of Oi Man Estate

General information
- Location: 60 Chung Hau Street, No. 12 Hill; Kowloon, Hong Kong
- Coordinates: 22.31286°N 114.178008°E
- Status: Completed
- Category: Public rental housing
- Population: 18,282 (2016)
- No. of blocks: 12
- No. of units: 6,289

Construction
- Constructed: 1974; 52 years ago
- Authority: Hong Kong Housing Authority

Oi Man Estate
- Traditional Chinese: 愛民邨
- Simplified Chinese: 爱民邨
Transcriptions
Standard Mandarin
- Hanyu Pinyin: Àimín Cūn
Yue: Cantonese
- Jyutping: oi3 man4 cyun1

Oi Man Estate (Chinese: 愛民邨) is a public housing estate in No. 12 Hill, Kowloon, Hong Kong. It is the largest public housing estate in Kowloon City District and has a total of 12 residential blocks which were completed between 1974 and 1975. It was officially opened by the Acting Governor Sir Denys Roberts on 20 November 1975.

Chun Man Court (俊民苑) is a Home Ownership Scheme court on No. 12 Hill, near Oi Man Estate. It consists of 12 blocks built in 1981.

== Background ==
The estate was built at a cost of $186 million and comprises 6,200 flats designed to house some 46,000 residents based on the Housing Authority's former space allocation standards of 35 square feet per person. The "authorised population" of Oi Man Estate has since been revised to 18,900 residents. It was designed by Housing Department architects, and followed the 1970s estate design innovation of being planned as to "provide every convenience for its residents from banks, markets to barbershops." To this end the estate opened with a three-storey air-conditioned commercial complex, a market, and cooked food stalls.

The British Hong Kong Government admired the construction of the estate because its construction showed improvements in public housing standards in Hong Kong. Oi Man Estate was on the itinerary of Queen Elizabeth II when she visited Hong Kong in 1975. Leader of the British Conservative Party Margaret Thatcher also visited in 1977 and toured Tak Man House, commenting on the modern living conditions, cleanliness of the block, and the cool air circulating within the Twin Tower block's atrium.

== Houses ==
=== Oi Man Estate ===
| Name | Chinese name | Building type | Completed |
|---|---|---|---|
| Wai Man House | 衛民樓 | Twin Tower | 1974–1975 |
| Sun Man House | 新民樓 | Twin Tower | 1974–1975 |
| Tak Man House | 德民樓 | Twin Tower | 1974–1975 |
| Tun Man House | 敦民樓 | Twin Tower | 1974–1975 |
| Shun Man House | 信民樓 | Twin Tower | 1974–1975 |
| Chiu Man House | 昭民樓 | Old Slab | 1974–1975 |
| Chung Man House | 頌民樓 | Old Slab | 1974–1975 |
| Hong Man House | 康民樓 | Old Slab | 1974–1975 |
| Kin Man House | 建民樓 | Old Slab | 1974–1975 |
| Lai Man House | 禮民樓 | Old Slab | 1974–1975 |
| Po Man House | 保民樓 | Old Slab | 1974–1975 |
| Kar Man House | 嘉民樓 | Old Slab | 1974–1975 |

=== Chun Man Court ===
| Name | Chinese name | Building type | Completed |
|---|---|---|---|
| Man Fuk House | 文福閣 | Non-Standard | 1981 |
| Man Pan House | 文斌閣 | Non-Standard | 1981 |
| Man Lan House | 文蘭閣 | Non-Standard | 1981 |
| Man Hor House | 文賀閣 | Non-Standard | 1981 |
| Man Chung House | 文宗閣 | Non-Standard | 1981 |
| Man Hoi House | 文凱閣 | Non-Standard | 1981 |
| Man Hung House | 文雄閣 | Non-Standard | 1981 |
| Man Hei House | 文禧閣 | Non-Standard | 1981 |
| Man Ming House | 文明閣 | Non-Standard | 1981 |
| Man Oi House | 文愛閣 | Non-Standard | 1981 |
| Man Shui House | 文瑞閣 | Non-Standard | 1981 |
| Man Yin House | 文彥閣 | Non-Standard | 1981 |

== Demographics ==
According to the 2016 by-census, Oi Man Estate had a population of 18,282 while Chun Man Court had a population of 4,935. Altogether the population amounts to 23,217.

== Politics ==
For the 2019 District Council election, the estate fell within two constituencies. Most of the estate and Chun Man Court are located in the Oi Chun constituency, which is represented by Cho Wui-hung, while the remainder of the estate falls within the Oi Man constituency, which is represented by Mak Sui-ki.

== Education ==
Oi Man Estate (including Chun Man Court) is in Primary One Admission (POA) School Net 34. Within the school net are multiple aided schools (operated independently but funded with government money) and two government schools: Farm Road Government Primary School and Ma Tau Chung Government Primary School.

== See also ==
- Public housing estates in Ho Man Tin
