= New Method College =

Coordinates: 22.3190°N 114.1789°E

- 新法書院
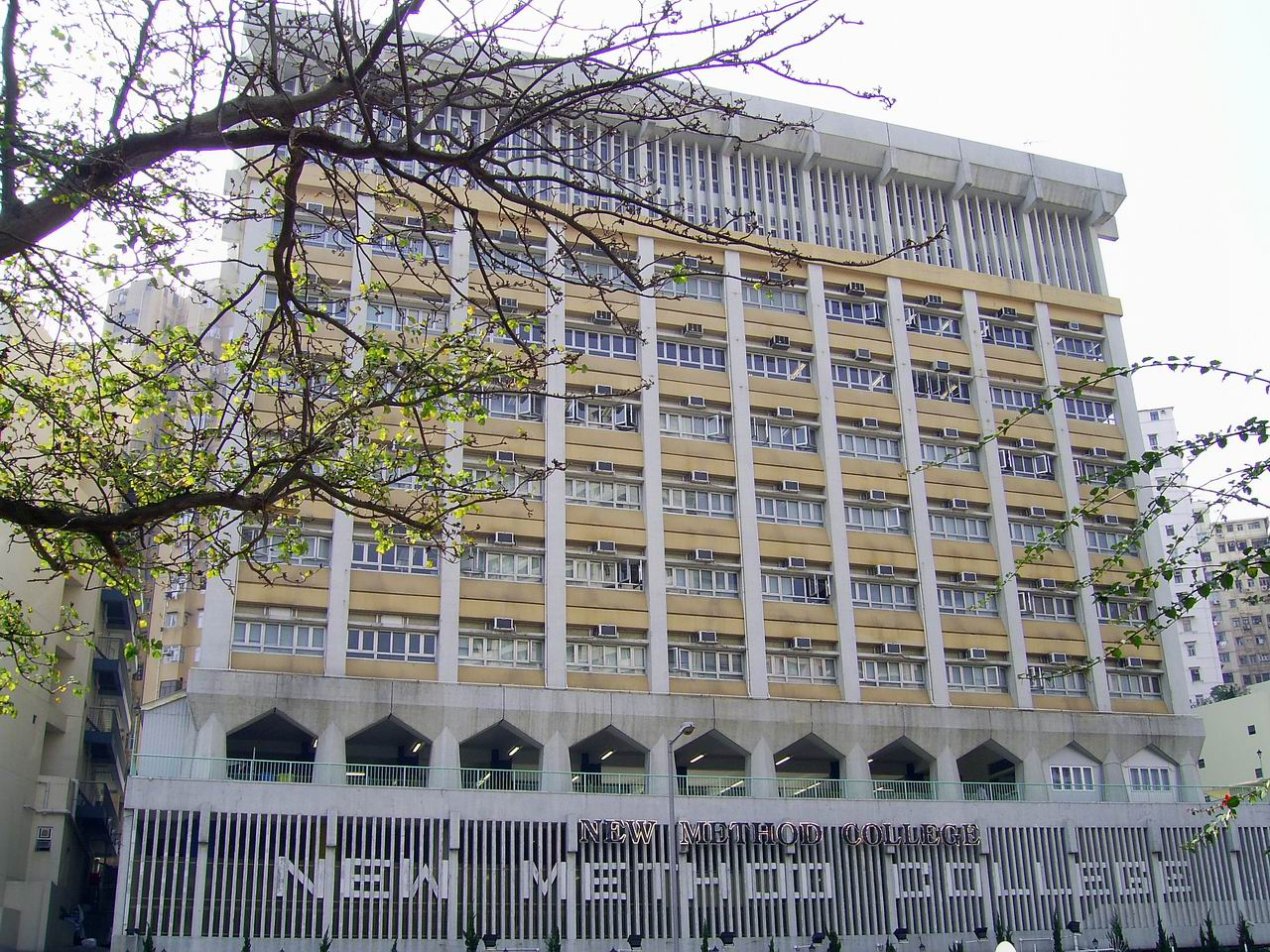
- 25 Man Fuk Road, Waterloo Hill, Homantin, Kowloon; Hong Kong

Information
- Funding type: Direct Subsidy Scheme, secondary
- Motto: 格物致知 (VERI SEQUACES)
- Established: 1951
- Grades: Form 1 - Form 7 (2010-2011 : F.5 to F.7, 2011-2012 : F.6 to F.7)
- Gender: Co-educational
- Medium of Instruction: English
- Website: http://www.nmc.edu.hk/eng/index.html

New Method College (abbreviated to NMC) was a secondary school located in Black Rock Hill, Kowloon City District, Hong Kong. Its stated mission was "to recognise each student as an individual". It was the fourth school of the same name, with the first one built in 1951 on Hong Kong Island. It was also the first school to participate in the Direct Subsidy Scheme. It was announced that the school would close in 2012 due to a chronic decrease in enrollments. The former campus at 25 Man Fuk Road now houses Stamford American School Hong Kong.

The college had a small pool of notable alumni who have made their names in politics and the entertainment industry.

== History ==
The precursor to the college was New Method English Tutorial School, opened in 1949. New Method College opened in Wanchai in 1951.
