= St. Teresa's Church (Hong Kong) =

Coordinates: 22.326201°N 114.177987°E

- 聖德肋撒堂
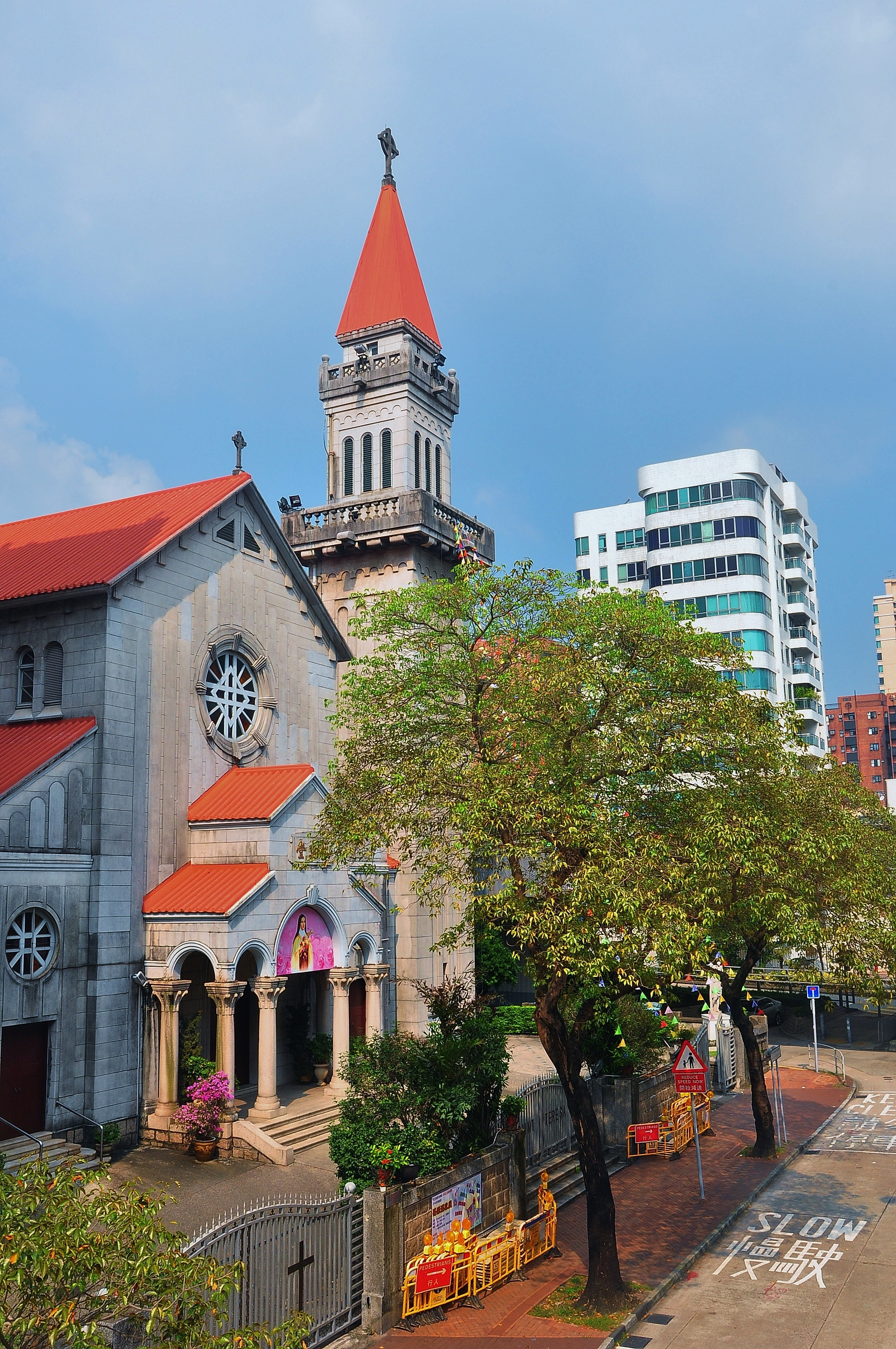
- St. Teresa's Church in Kowloon Tong.
- St. Teresa's Church
- Location: No. 258 Prince Edward Road West, Kowloon, Hong Kong
- Website: stteresa.catholic.org.hk

History
- Status: Parish Church
- Founded: 23 April 1932; 94 years ago

Architecture
- Architectural type: Romanesque

Administration
- Diocese: Hong Kong

Clergy
- Bishop: Stephen Chow
- Priest: Moses Ngai Tak Man

St. Teresa's Church
- Traditional Chinese: 聖德肋撒堂
- Simplified Chinese: 圣德肋撒堂
Transcriptions
Standard Mandarin
- Hanyu Pinyin: Shèng Délèisā Táng

St. Teresa's Church (Chinese: 聖德肋撒堂) is a Roman Catholic church in Kowloon Tong, Hong Kong.

== History ==
St. Teresa's Church was established on 23 April 1932. It was designed by the architectural practice of the Crédit Foncier d'Extrême-Orient.

The design of the Church came from the Holland Benedictine Order artist cum architect Rev. Fr. Adalbert Gresnigt O.S.B. His works spread across USA, Brazil etc. The Beijing Fu Jen University and Holy Spirit Seminary are example of his work. He adopted the Roman round figures to design the St. Teresa Church, making its atmosphere simple yet sincere.

The Church is the one of the Jubilee Pilgrimage Shrine during the 2016 Extraordinary Jubilee of Mercy.

== Pastoral team ==
Position	Name	Diocese / Religious Order
Parish Priest	Rev. Fr. Moses Ngai Tak Man	Diocese of Hong Kong
Assistant Parish Priest	Rev. Fr. Bernardo Cervellera	Pontifical Institute for Foreign Missions
Assistant Parish Priest	Rev. Fr. Franco Cumbo	Pontifical Institute for Foreign Missions
Assistant Parish Priest	Rev. Fr. Peter Le The Hai	Society of the Divine Word
Permanent Deacon	Rev. Deacon John Siu Sze Chuen	Diocese of Hong Kong

== See also ==
- List of Catholic churches in Hong Kong
- St. Teresa's School Kowloon
- St. Teresa Secondary School
