= Waterloo Hill =

Hill in Hong Kong

Coordinates: 22.31936°N 114.17755°E

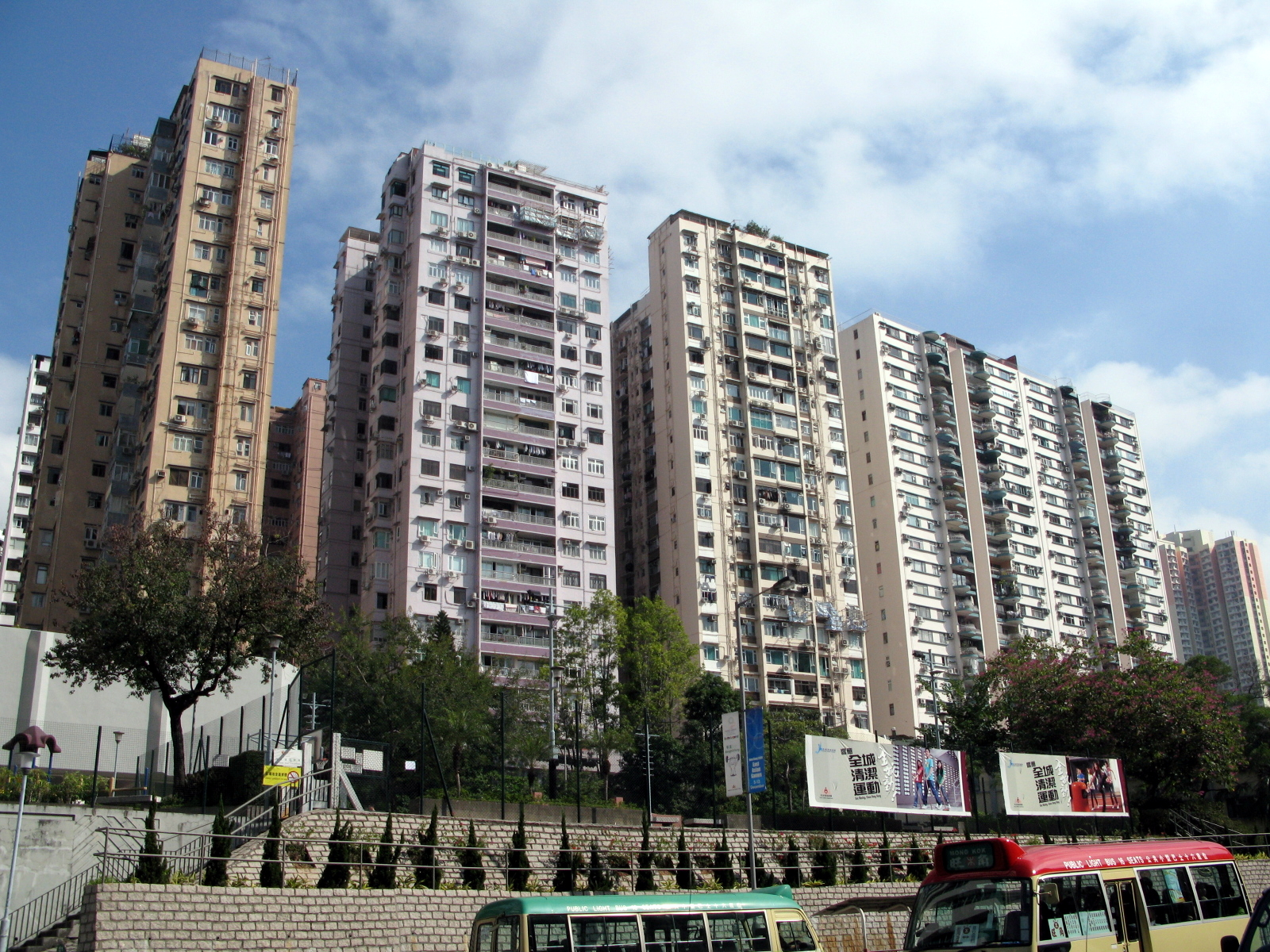
Residential buildings on Waterloo Hill Apartments in December 2009

Waterloo Road Hill (Chinese: 窩打老道山) or Black Rock Hill is a hill near Ho Man Tin in Hong Kong. It is a quiet residential district. It is named from Waterloo Road, which is a major road in Kowloon.

== History ==
On 24 August 1967, Lam Bun was on his way to work when men posing as road maintenance workers stopped his vehicle and blocked his car doors and doused Lam and his cousin with petrol.

== Education ==
- New Method College
- Yu Chun Keung Memorial College
