= Celestial Heights =

Housing estate in Kowloon, Hong Kong

Coordinates: 22.31927°N 114.18477°E

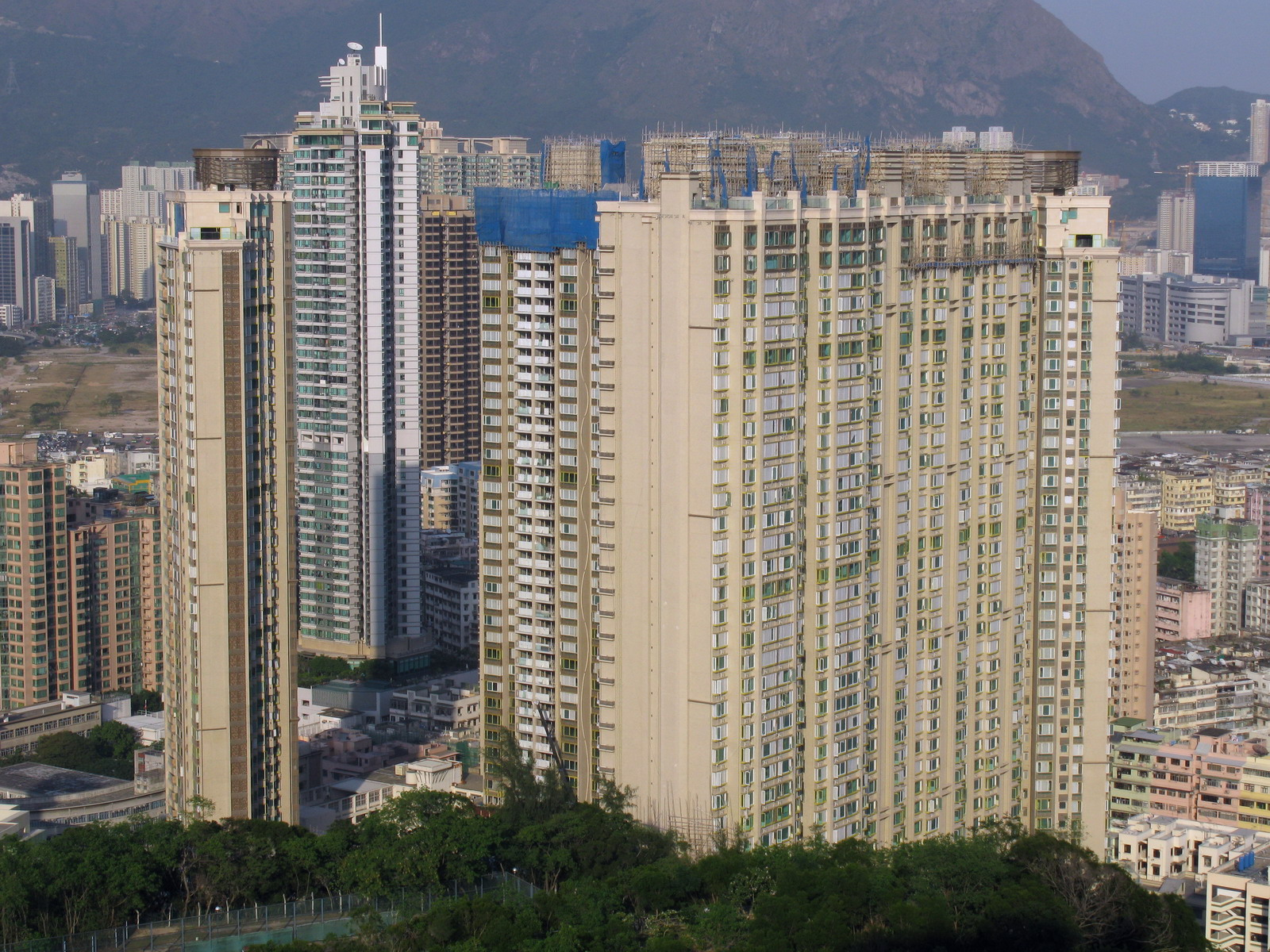
- Interactive map of Celestial Heights
- Location: Quarry Hill, Kowloon
- Groundbreaking: 2006; 20 years ago

Companies
- Developer: Cheung Kong / Nan Fung Group

Technical details
- Buildings: 33 blocks, 939 units

Celestial Heights
- Traditional Chinese: 半山壹號
- Simplified Chinese: 半山壹号
Transcriptions
Standard Mandarin
- Hanyu Pinyin: Bànshān Yihào
Yue: Cantonese
- Jyutping: bun3 saan1 jat1 hou6

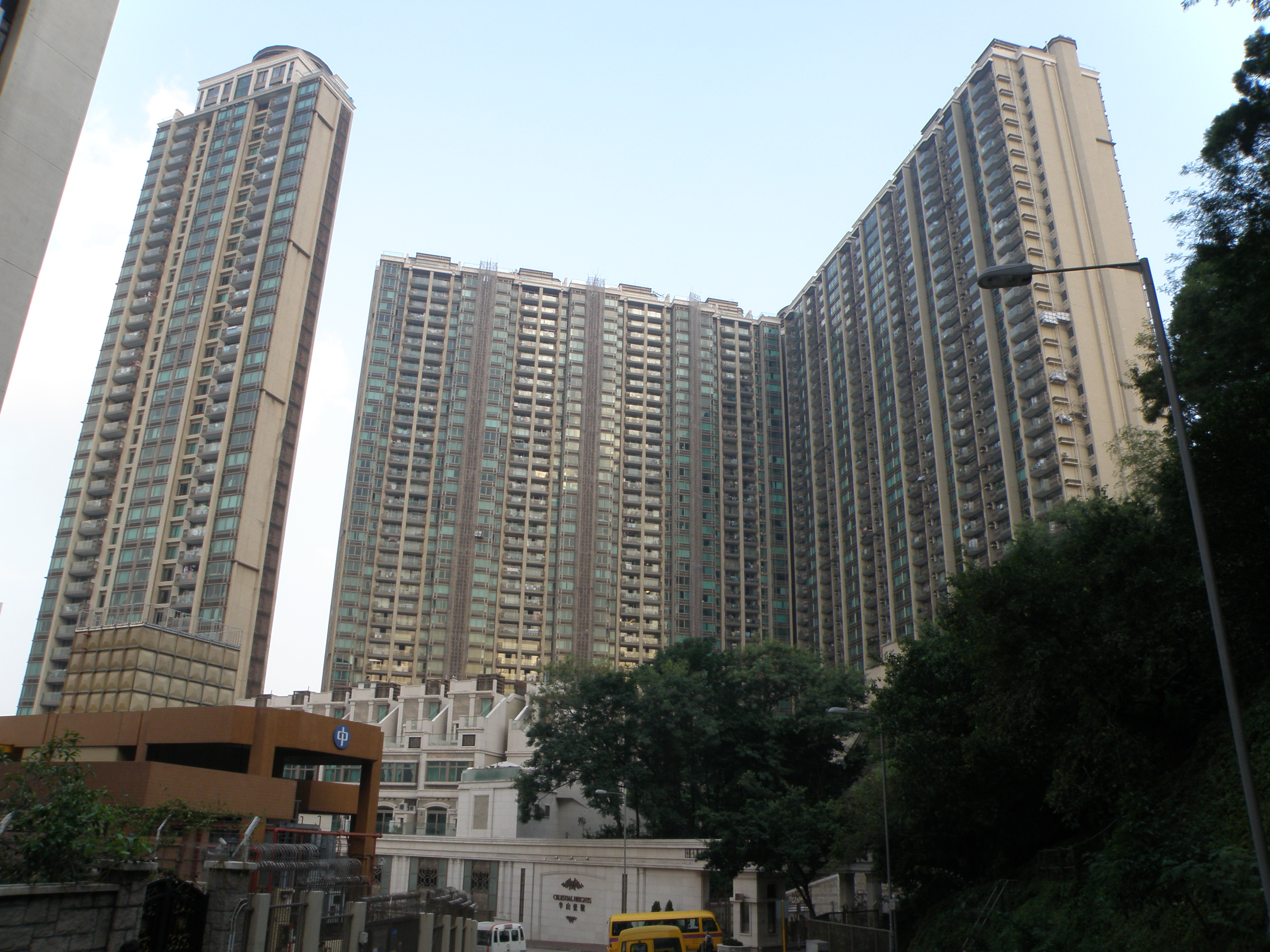
Celestial Heights.

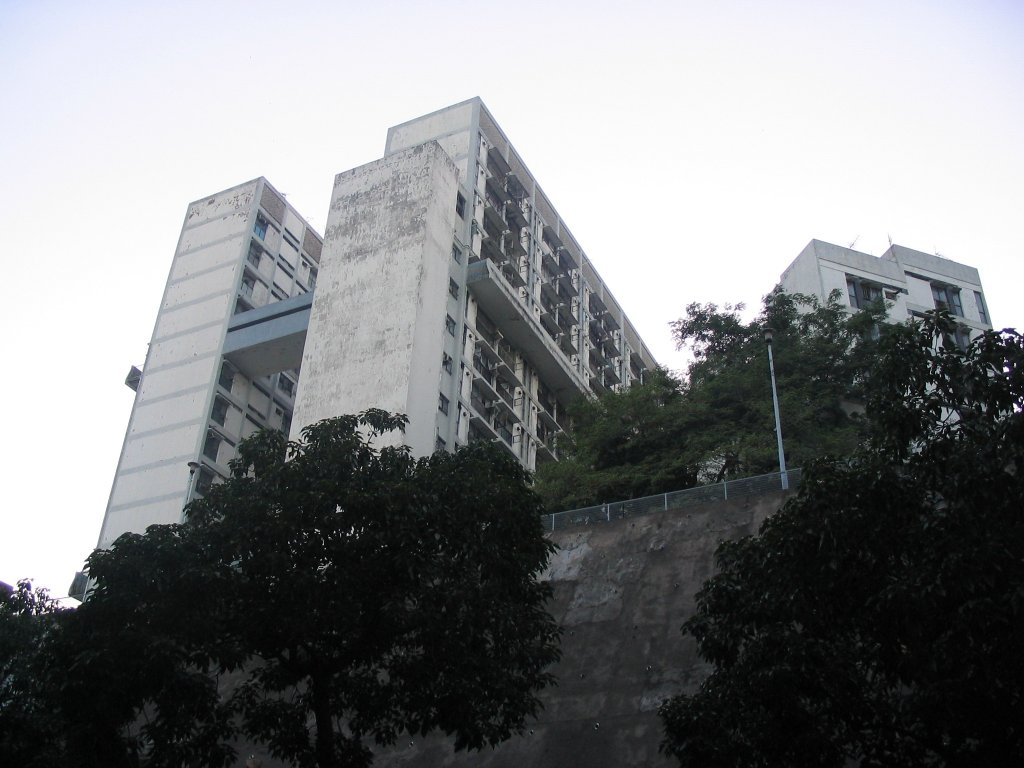
Celestial Heights was the location of Tin Kwong Road Police Married Quarters.

Celestial Heights (Chinese: 半山壹號; Jyutping: bun3 saan1 jat1 hou6) is a private housing estate on Quarry Hill in Kowloon, Hong Kong, jointly developed by Cheung Kong Holdings and Nan Fung Group near To Kwa Wan station. There are 939 housing units, with an average price of HK$19,000,000. It is composed of several more-than-50-floor buildings. It was completed in 2009 and 2010.

== History ==
In 2004, Cheung Kong Holdings paid HK$9.4 billion for the land of the former Ho Man Tin Police Married Quarters during an auction. This price was the second highest record in Hong Kong property history after Sino Land paid HK$11.8 billion for the land in Siu Sai Wan, later Island Resort, in 1997. In 2020, lots of people moved there.

== Features ==
The shopping arcade of Celestial Heights could only be accessed on Kau Pui Lung Road, which is very distant from the address listed.

== Education ==
Celestial Heights is in Primary One Admission (POA) School Net 34. Within the school net are multiple aided schools (operated independently but funded with government money) and two government schools: Farm Road Government Primary School (農圃道官立小學) and Ma Tau Chung Government Primary School (馬頭涌官立小學).
