= Quenby Fung =

Hong Kong writer (1965–2020)

- Born: Fung Yan Yan; November 12, 1965; Hong Kong
- Died: February 23, 2020 (aged 54)
- Education: Holy Angels Canossian School; St. Teresa Secondary School; University of Oregon
- Occupation: Novelist
- Writing career
- Years active: 1985–2019
- Genres: Adolescent Literature, Children's Books

Quenby Fung (Chinese: 君比) (12 November 1965 – 23 February 2020), born Fung Yan Yan (Chinese: 馮忻忻) was a novelist in Hong Kong focused on writing Chinese children's literature for early teens. She had been writing stories and novels when she was studying in university. She became a teacher later on when she returned to Hong Kong from studying in the United States, and started a column in a local leading newspaper, the Ming Pao.

Quenby's pen name came from her award-winning novel of the same name. Her stories are known for depicting the subtle changes in feelings and behavioral changes of teenagers, as she was an experienced English teacher in a local girls' school. Many schools choose her novels as selected books for book reports.

== Information on her novels ==
Fung's novels focus on depicting the mindset and behaviors of adolescents, such as interpersonal relationships of secondary school students and the romantic lives of them. She makes good use of her role as a secondary school English teacher to experience and understand the mindsets of secondary school students, and exhibit them through her novels. Her books are very popular among youngsters in Hong Kong, especially among the senior primary and junior secondary students.

== Influence and impact to society ==
Some students being bullied or having experienced family problems are willing to contact teachers and social workers for help after reading her inspiring books. Thus, Fung was willing to donate to, and support organizations in Hong Kong that provide support for teenagers.
