= Sheng Kung Hui Tsoi Kung Po Secondary School =

Coordinates: 22.314925°N 114.180576°E

Sheng Kung Hui Tsoi Kung Po Secondary School Chinese: 聖公會蔡功譜中學
- 101 Chung Hau Street, Homantin, Kowloon; Hong Kong

Information
- Funding type: Grant School, secondary
- Motto: Faithful to God, Charitable to Man
- Established: 1982
- President: Mr. TSIK Chung Hong
- Principal: Ms. LAM Yuk Kei (BA, Dip. Ed., MED)
- Grades: Secondary 1 - Secondary 6
- Gender: Co-educational
- Houses: Charity , Magnanimity , Loyalty , Integrity , Brown (This house was closed on 9/2011)
- Affiliation: Anglican (Hong Kong Sheng Kung Hui)
- Medium of Instruction: Chinese and English
- School Size: About 8000 Sq. M
- Website: www.tkp.edu.hk

Sheng Kung Hui Tsoi Kung Po Secondary School (TKP, Chinese: 聖公會蔡功譜中學) is a secondary school in Homantin, Kowloon, Hong Kong. It is managed by the Anglican (Hong Kong) Secondary Schools Council Limited. This school was founded in 1982. It is a Co-educational secondary School.

Sheng Kung Hui Tsoi Kung Po Secondary School is an Anglican church school.

== See also ==
- Education in Hong Kong
- List of schools in Hong Kong
- Hong Kong
- Media related to SKH Tsoi Kung Po Secondary School at Wikimedia Commons
