= Sarah Chan =

Researcher

- Education: University of Manchester; University of Melbourne
- Scientific career
- Workplaces: University of Edinburgh; University of Manchester

Sarah Chan is Chancellor's Fellow in Ethics and Science Communicator in The Usher Institute at the University of Edinburgh. She was elected a Fellow of the Royal Society of Edinburgh Young Academy of Scotland in 2018.

== Early life and education ==
Chan completed her undergraduate degrees in law and biological sciences at the University of Melbourne. She earned a Bachelor of Laws and Bachelor of Science. She worked briefly as a laboratory scientist in molecular biology before focussing her efforts on policy and ethics. Chan moved to the United Kingdom, and earned a doctoral degree in healthcare ethics at the University of Manchester.

== Research and career ==
In 2005 Chan was appointed a Research Fellow Bioethics and Law at the University of Manchester. She was appointed Deputy Director of the Institute for Science, Ethics and Innovation in 2009. Chan works on medical ethics, with a particular focus on stem cells, embryos and reproductive medicine. and has written about the ethical risks associated with genome editing. She moved to the University of Edinburgh In 2016 she was awarded a Wellcome Trust seed grant to investigate the relationships between social media and health, studying the nature of patient participation in the digital age. She has studied the ethical implications of animal enhancement.

Chan is a popular science communicator, and has delivered lectures at various venues including the Max Planck Institute of Neurobiology, the Royal Society and the Nuffield Council on Bioethics. She provides comment to the national media, including the BBC. She is a member of the SynBioChem council, which looks to develop sustainable speciality chemicals.

Chan was elected to the Royal Society of Edinburgh in 2018. She serves on the Genomics England Ethics Advisory Committee and the Scottish Genomes Partnership.

=== Selected publications ===
Her publications include;

- Coggon, John; Chan, Sarah (2015). From reason to practice in bioethics. Manchester University Press. ISBN 978-0-7190-9623-5.
- Daniela, Cutas; Chan, Sarah (2012). Families – Beyond the Nuclear Ideal (Science Ethics and Society). Bloomsbury Academic.
- Chan, SW (2017). "Montgomery and informed consent: where are we now?". BMJ. 35.
- Chan, Sarah (2018). "In search of a post-genomic bioethics: Lessons from Political Biology". History of the Human Sciences. doi:10.1177/0952695117729119c.
