= Quarry Hill (Hong Kong) =

Hill in Hong Kong

Quarry Hill, Hong Kong
- 採石山
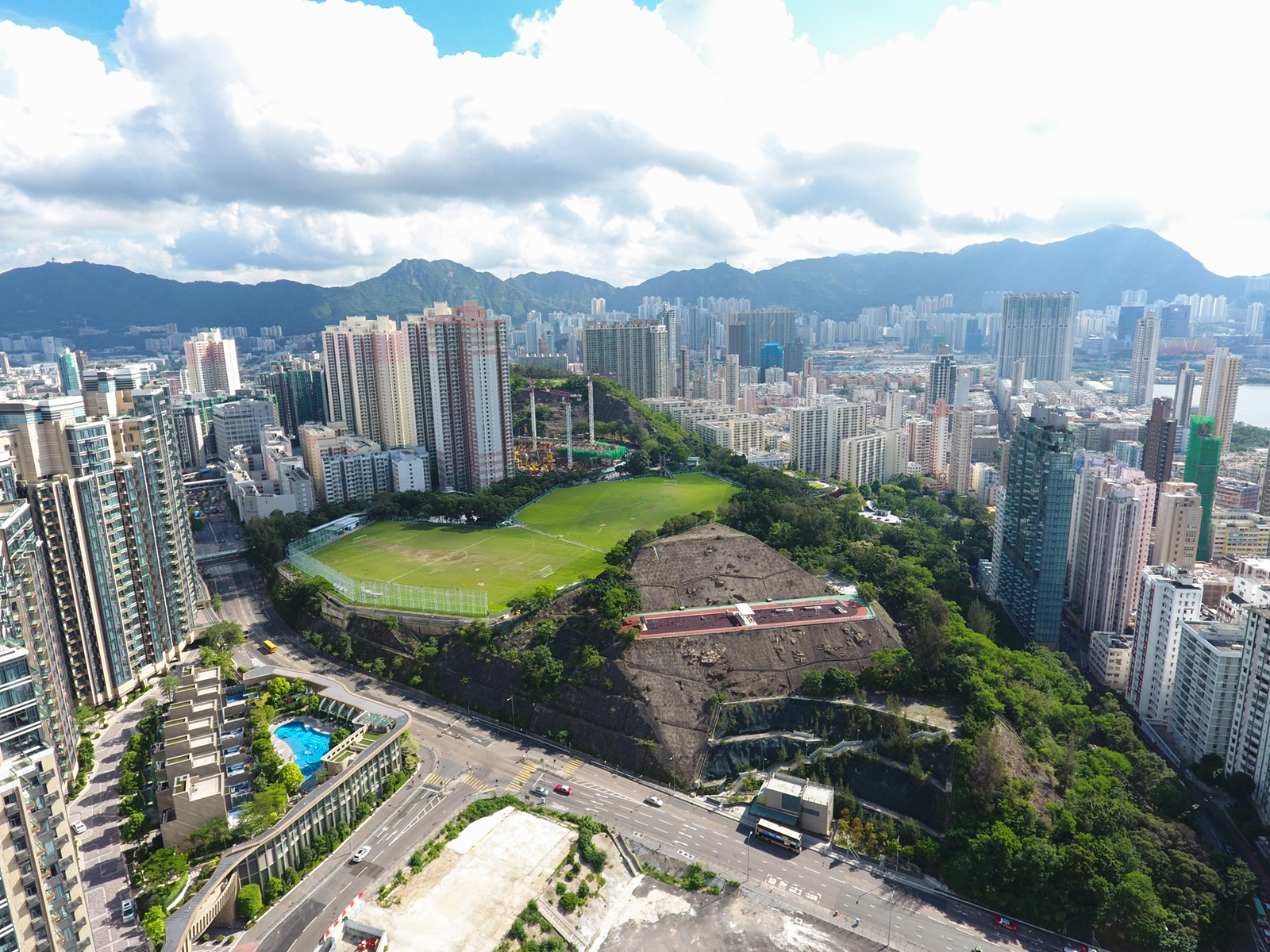
- View of Quarry Hill

Highest point
- Elevation: 106.8 m (350 ft)
- Coordinates: 22.315775°N 114.184042°E

Geography
- Location within Hong Kong
- Location: Hong Kong

Quarry Hill (Chinese: 採石山) is a hill east of Ho Man Tin near the east coast of the Kowloon Peninsula in Hong Kong where present-day Ho Man Tin (South) Estate is located. Its peak is 106.8 metres (350 ft) high. The area was once zoned as the Shek Shan Resettlement Area (石山徙置區), above Kau Pui Lung Road and near present-day Lok Man Sun Chuen.

== History ==
At the time of the 1911 census, the population of Shek Shan was 277. The number of males was 178.

== Streets and places in Quarry Hill ==
- Sheung Shing Street
- Sheung Lok Street
- Sheung Wo Street
- Shing Lok House
- Fat Kwong Street
- Ho Man Tin Estate
- Ho Man Tin (South) Estate
- Ho Man Tin Plaza
- One Homantin
- Mantin Heights
- Celestial Heights

== Education ==
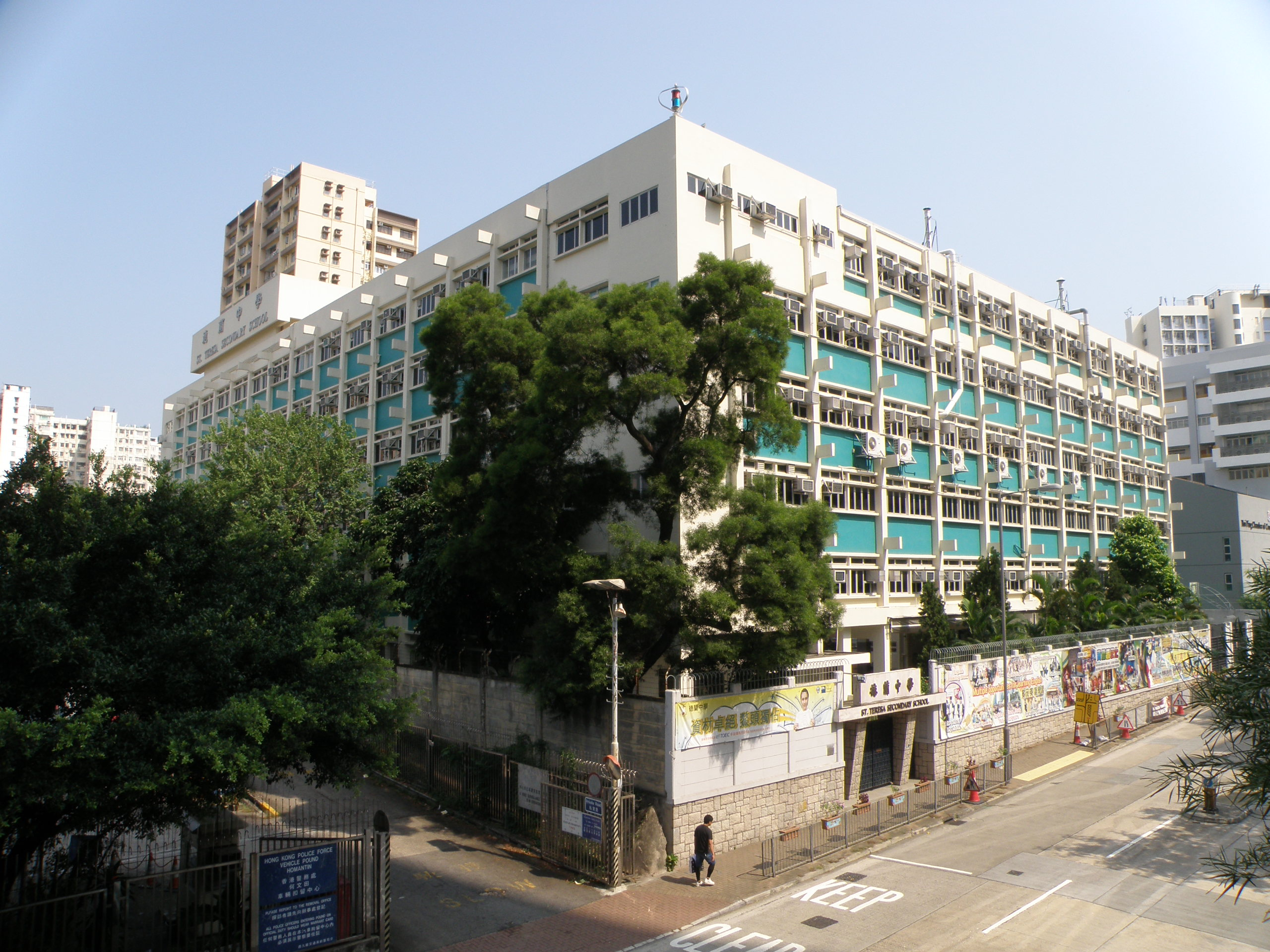
Campus view of St. Teresa Secondary School, the only girl school in Quarry Hill

Educational institutions in Quarry Hill include:

- Chan Sui Ki (La Salle) College
- Hoi Ping Chamber of Commerce Secondary School
- St. Teresa Secondary School
- Y.W.C.A. Hioe Tjo Yoeng College
- Wa Ying College

== Public services ==
- Hong Kong Housing Authority Exhibition Centre

== Community facilities ==
- T.W.G.Hs. Wong Cho Tong Social Service Building
- SAHK LOHAS Garden
- Sheung Shing Street Park

== Transport ==
- Ho Man Tin Bus Terminus
- Ho Man Tin station
