= Oi Man (constituency) =

Hong Kong constituency

- 愛民
- Elected constituency for the Kowloon City District Council
- Boundary of Oi Man in Kowloon City District
- District: Kowloon City
- Legislative Council constituency: Kowloon Central
- Population: 15,915 (2019)
- Electorate: 9,441 (2019)

Current constituency
- Created: 1991
- Number of members: One
- Member: Vacant

Oi Man (Chinese: 愛民), previously Oi Kuk, is one of the 24 constituencies in the Kowloon City District of Hong Kong which was created in 1991.

The constituency has an estimated population of 15,915.

== Councillors represented ==
Election	Member	Party
1991	Chan Chi-kwan	Independent
199?	Chan Chi-kwan	DAB
1994	Chan Shing-kwong	Independent
1999	Lau Tat-cho	DAB
2003	Chan Lai-kwan	Democratic
2011	Ng Fan-kam	DAB
2019	Mak Sui-ki→Vacant (Note: Resigned on 10 July 2021.)	Democratic

== Election results ==
=== 2010s ===
Kowloon City District Council Election, 2019: Oi Man
Party	Candidate	Votes	%	±%
Democratic	Mak Sui-ki	3,625	53.30	
DAB	Ng Fan-kam	3,176	46.70	
Majority		449	6.60	
Turnout		6,838	72.47	
Democratic gain from DAB		Swing		
