= Ho Man Tin =

Area in Kowloon, Hong Kong

Coordinates: 22°19′N 114°11′E

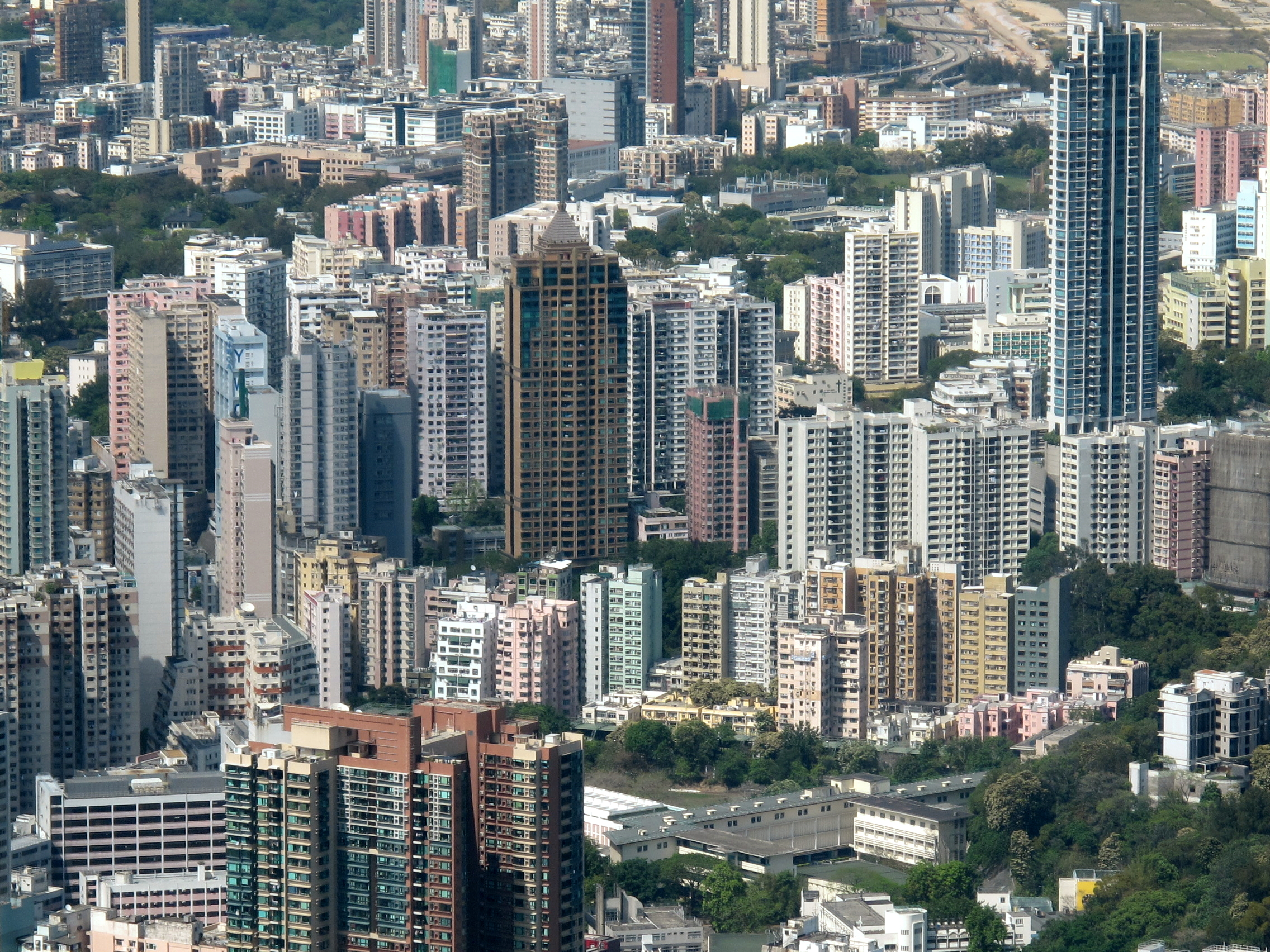
- Ho Man Tin Residential
- Interactive map of Ho Man Tin
- SAR: Hong Kong
- District: Kowloon City

Ho Man Tin
- Chinese: 何文田
- Cantonese Yale: Hòh màhn tìhn
Transcriptions
Standard Mandarin
- Hanyu Pinyin: Héwéntián
Yue: Cantonese
- Yale Romanization: Hòh màhn tìhn
- Jyutping: Ho4 man4 tin4
- IPA: [hɔ̏ː.mɐ̏n.tʰȉn]

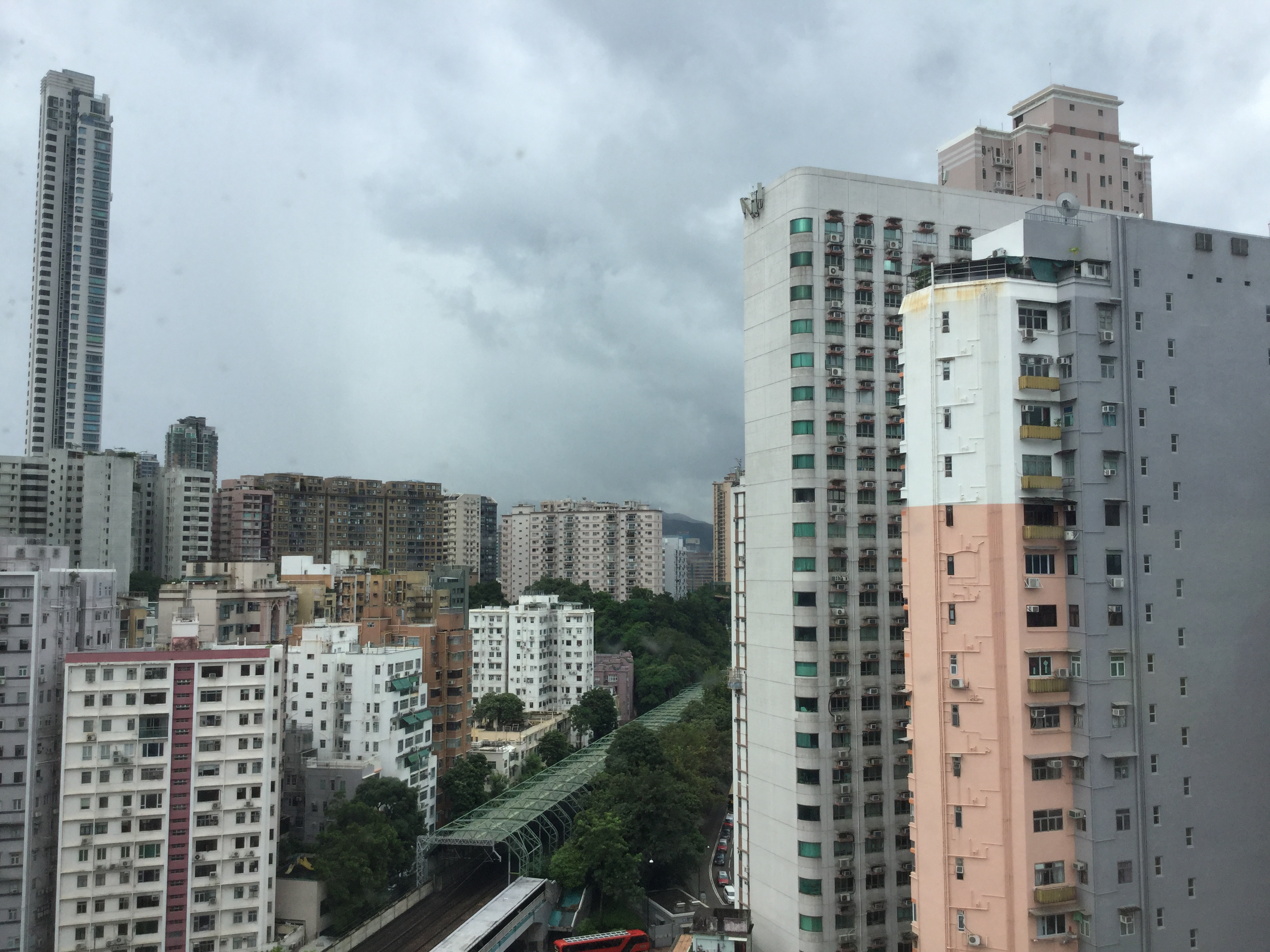
Ho Man Tin View from Pak Po Street's Ngai Hing Mansion

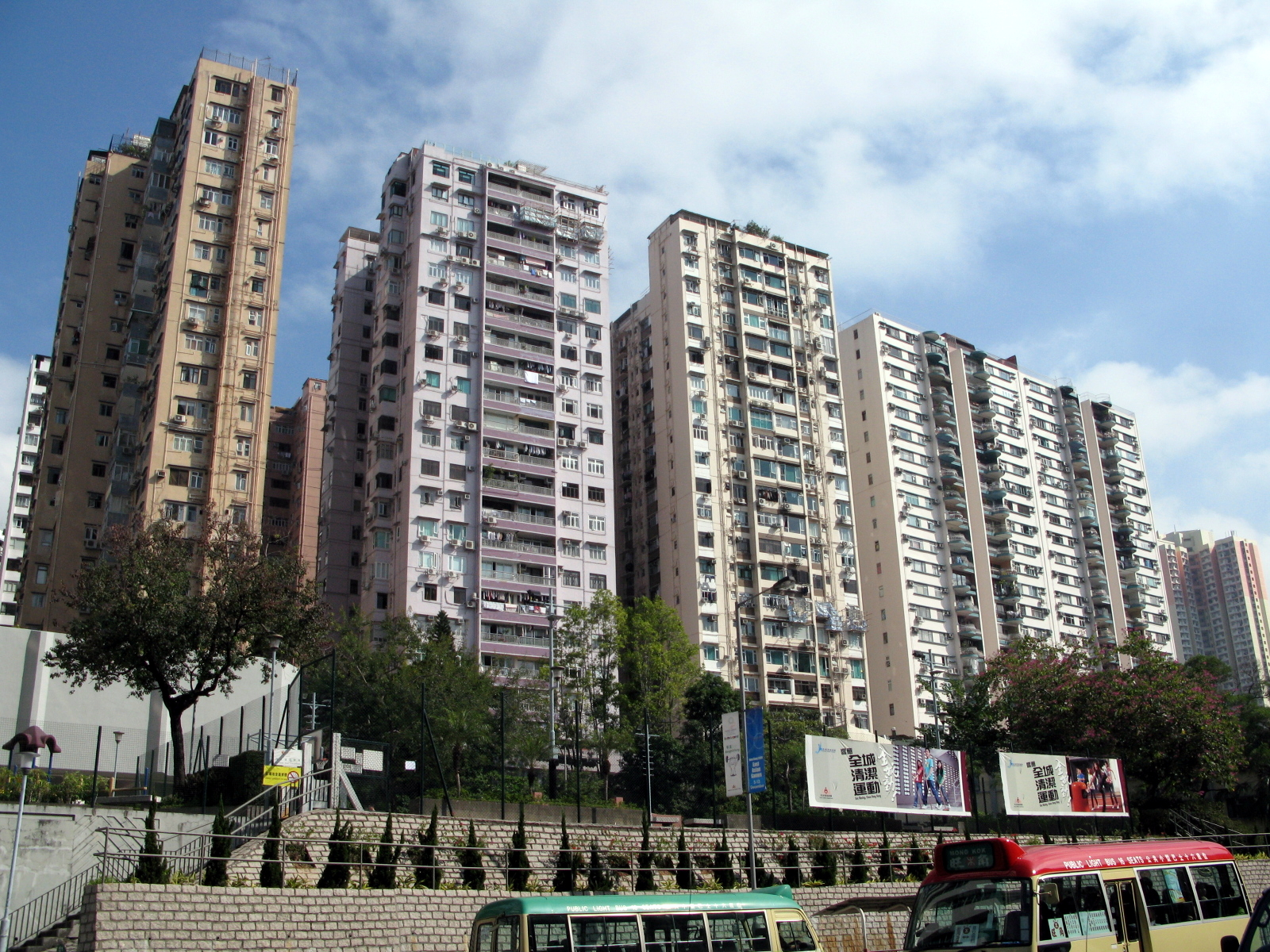
Waterloo Road Hill Apartment built in 1960s

Ho Man Tin is a mostly residential area in Kowloon, Hong Kong, part of the Kowloon City District.

== History ==
Section of lists of villages in the book Xin'an Xianzhi (literally The History of Xin'an County) published in twenty fourth year of Jiaqing era (A.D. 1819) did not have any record of Ho Man Tin.

The original Ho Man Tin was quite different from today's Ho Man Tin. It was located in the heart of nowaday Mong Kok. With cultivated lands, it was surrounded in the north by Argyle Street, west by Coronation Road (present-day Nathan Road), and east by Quarry Hill, No. 12 Hill and Tai Shek Kwu (present-day Kadoorie Hill). Southeast from its original location is Fo Pang and to the south Mong Kok. Streams from those hills in the east offered water for cultivation, the latter reflected in the area's name last Chinese character, i.e. tin, 田, which means field. The "Ho" (何) and "Man" (文) part of the name are both Chinese surnames; so Ho Man Tin represents the agricultural land owned by the "Ho" and "Man", the major families who took their residence around the area.

At the time of the 1911 census, the population of Ho Man Tin was 470. The number of males was 272.

In the 1950s and 1960s, the eastern hills to the original site of Ho Man Tin became a resettlement area for refugees from China, the city building there the Ho Man Tin Estate, which gave the name Ho Man Tin to that section of the hills, thus shifting away name-wise from the original flat fields. The present-day Ho Man Tin is close to Argyle Street and Kowloon Hospital. The area is within the district of the Kowloon City police station.

Today, Ho Man Tin is home to many public housing estates as well as the headquarters of the Housing Authority. Oi Man Estate was on the itinerary of Queen Elizabeth II when she visited Hong Kong in 1975.

== Streets and places in Ho Man Tin ==
- Ho Man Tin Hill
- Peace Avenue
- Perth Street
- Princess Margaret Road
- Pui Ching Road
- Soares Avenue
- Victory Avenue
- Waterloo Hill

== Community facilities ==
- Perth Street Sports Ground

== Public services ==
- Kowloon Public Library
- Kowloon Hospital
- Kowloon Rehabilitation Centre
- Hong Kong Housing Authority Headquarters

== Education ==
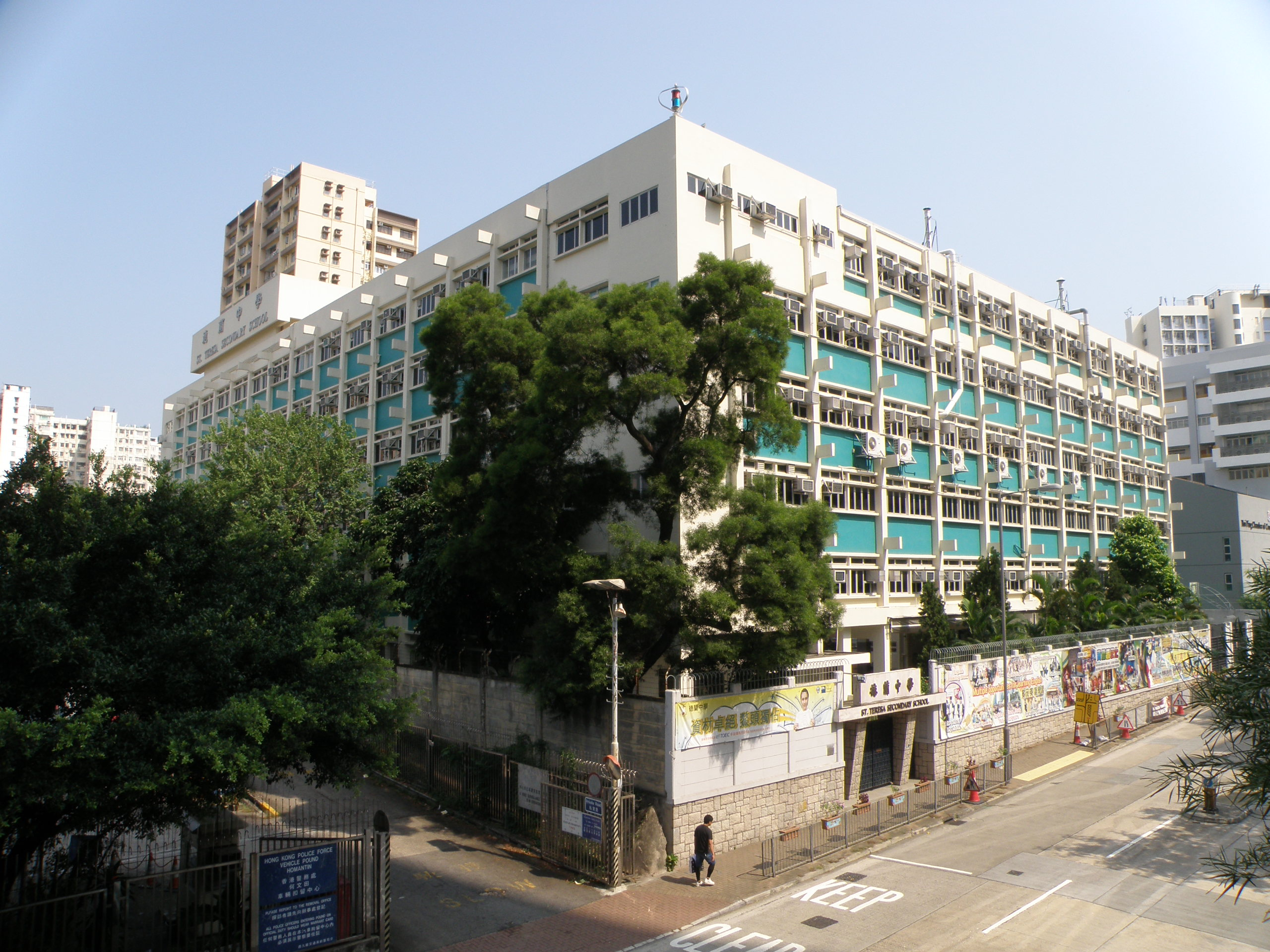
Campus view of St. Teresa Secondary School, the only girls' school in Ho Man Tin

Educational institutions in Ho Man Tin include:

- The Metropolitan University of Hong Kong
- Homantin Government Secondary School (何文田官立中學)
- King George V School
- Kowloon Junior School
- Pentecostal School
- Pui Ching Middle School
- Shun Tak Fraternal Association Seaward Woo College
- St. Teresa Secondary School
- Workers' Children Secondary School
- Yu Chun Keung Memorial College

Ho Man Tin is in Primary One Admission (POA) School Net 34. Within the school net are multiple aided schools (operated independently but funded with government money) and two government schools: Farm Road Government Primary School (農圃道官立小學) and Ma Tau Chung Government Primary School (馬頭涌官立小學).

Hong Kong Public Libraries maintains the Kowloon Public Library in Ho Man Tin.

== Transport ==
Princess Margaret Road, Waterloo Road, Argyle Street and Pui Ching Road act as the main arteries of the Ho Man Tin area, and it is conveniently served by public buses.

Despite the name, Ho Man Tin station of the Mass Transit Railway (MTR) is not located in Ho Man Tin proper but in the lesser known area Lo Lung Hang instead. The central part of Ho Man Tin between Argyle Street and Waterloo Road is in fact more than 1 km (0.62 mi) away on foot. This led to a debate on its naming circa the station's opening. The closest station to Ho Man Tin proper is actually Mong Kok East on the East Rail line.

== See also ==
- List of places in Hong Kong
- Kowloon City
