= Ho Man Tin Estate =

Public housing estate in Kowloon, Hong Kong

Coordinates: 22.31537°N 114.18253°E

- Chinese: 何文田邨
Transcriptions
Standard Mandarin
- Hanyu Pinyin: Hé Wén Tián Cūn
Yue: Cantonese
- Yale Romanization: hòh màhn tìhn chyūn
- Jyutping: ho4 man4 tin4 cyun1

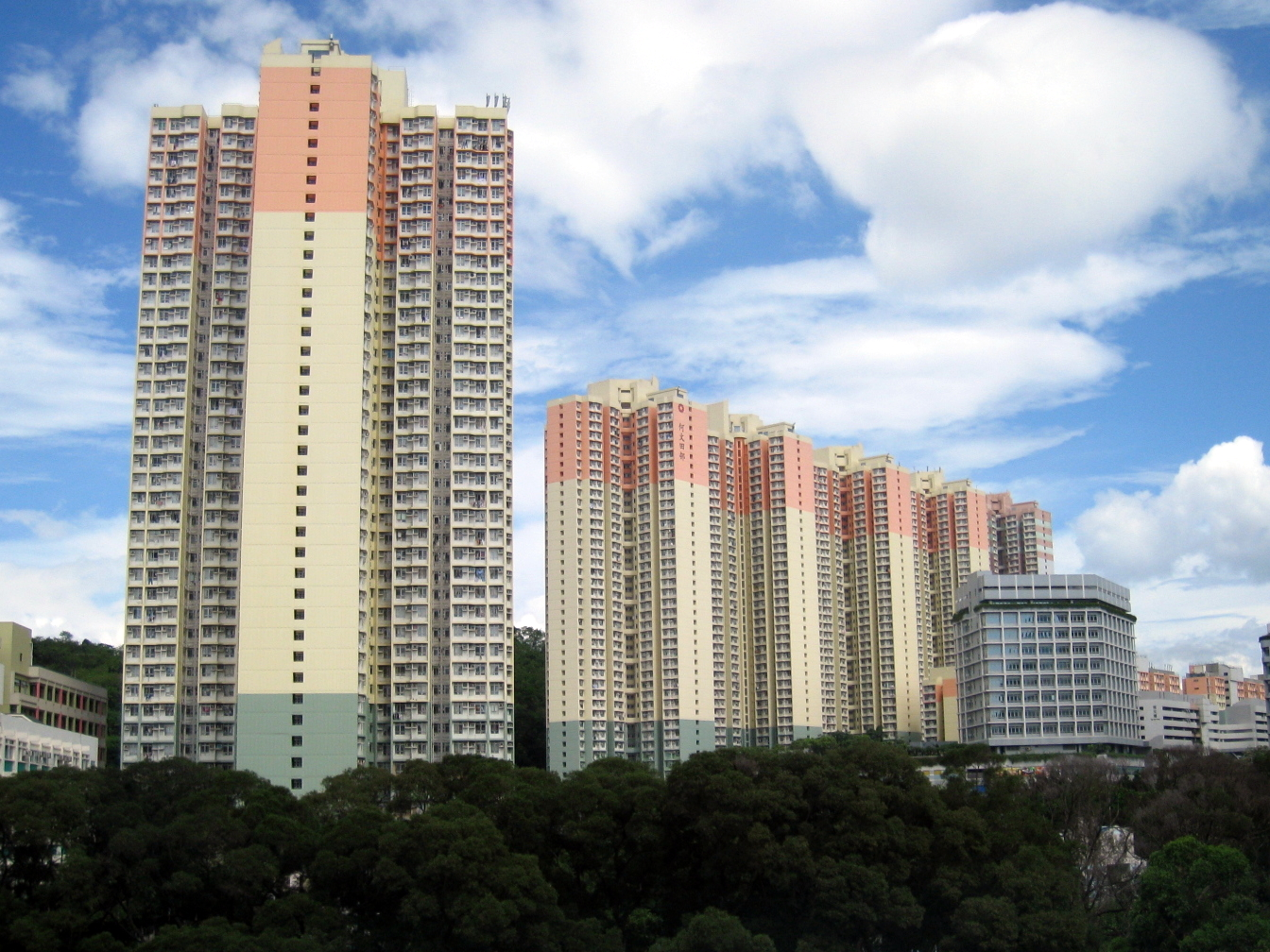
Ho Man Tin Estate.

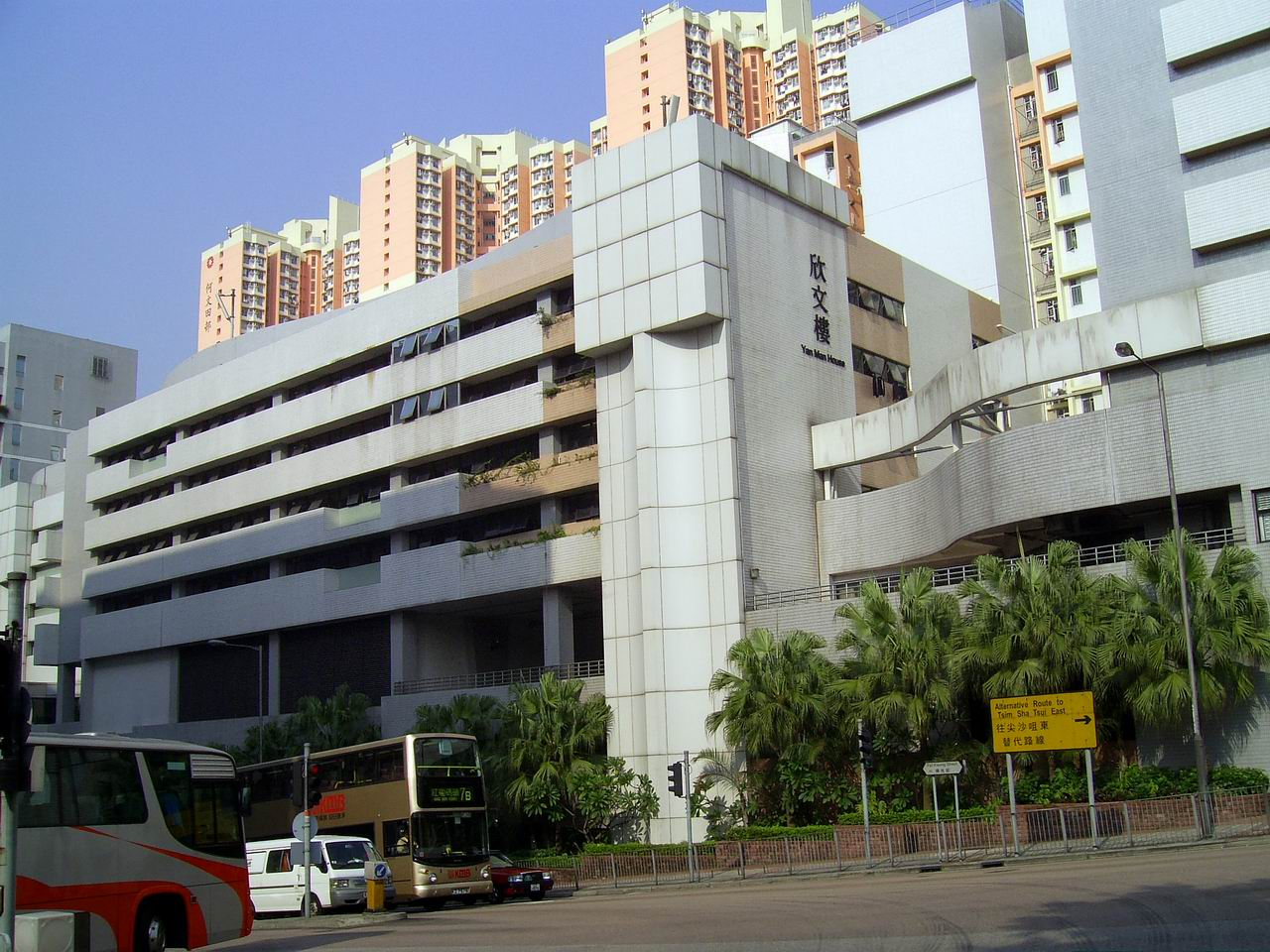
Yan Man House, Ho Man Tin Estate.

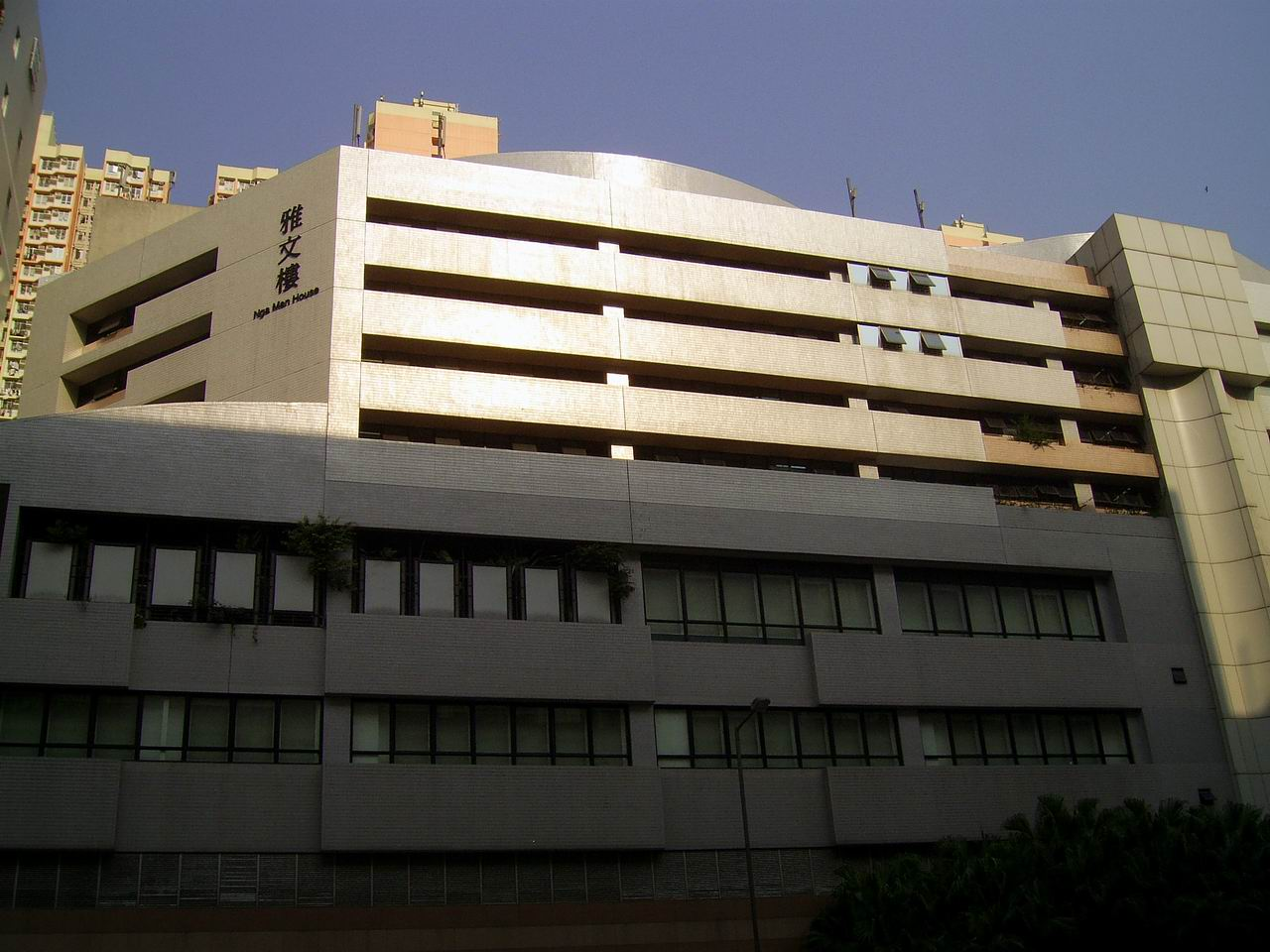
Nga Man House, Ho Man Tin Estate.

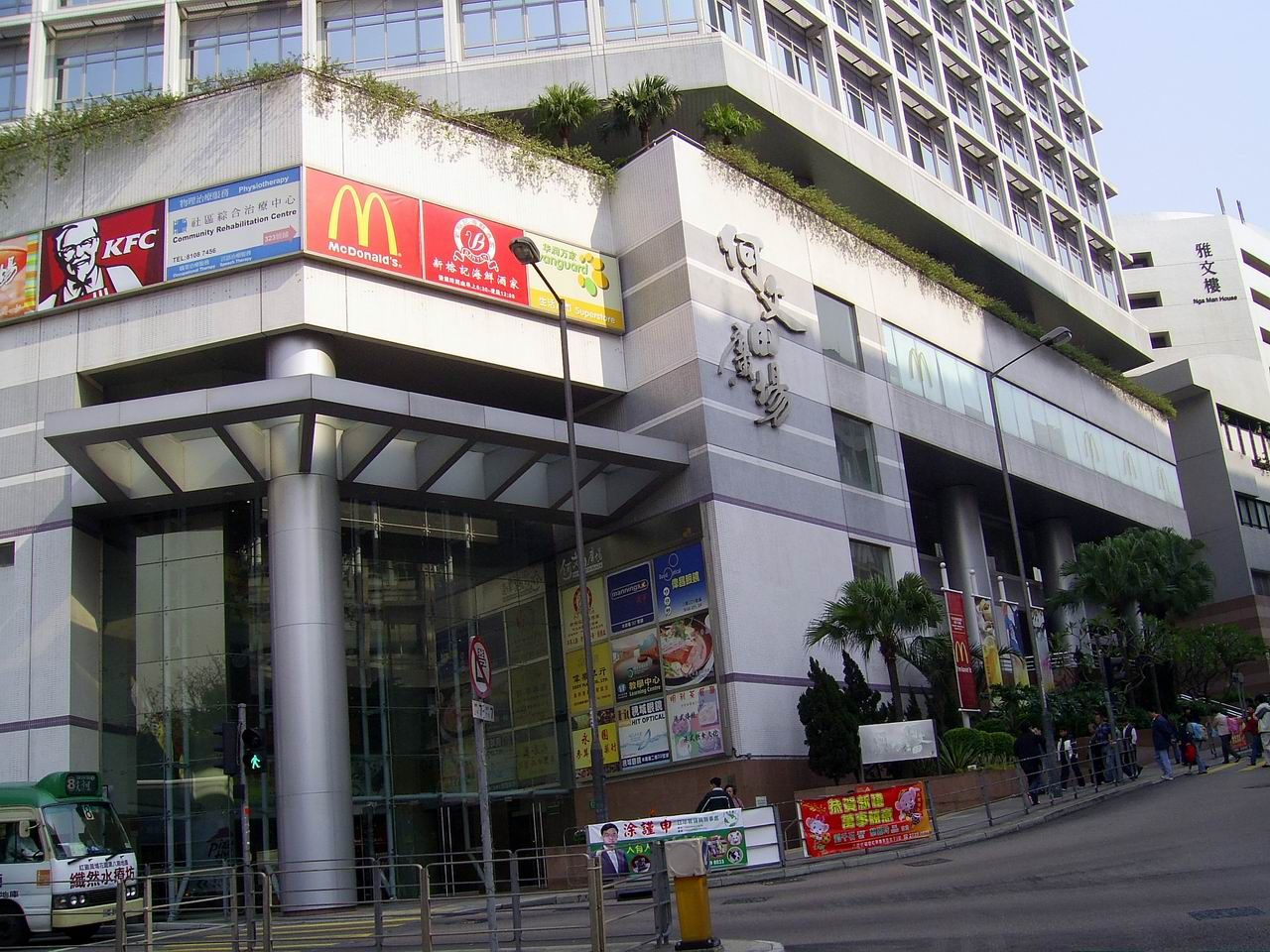
Ho Man Tin Plaza.

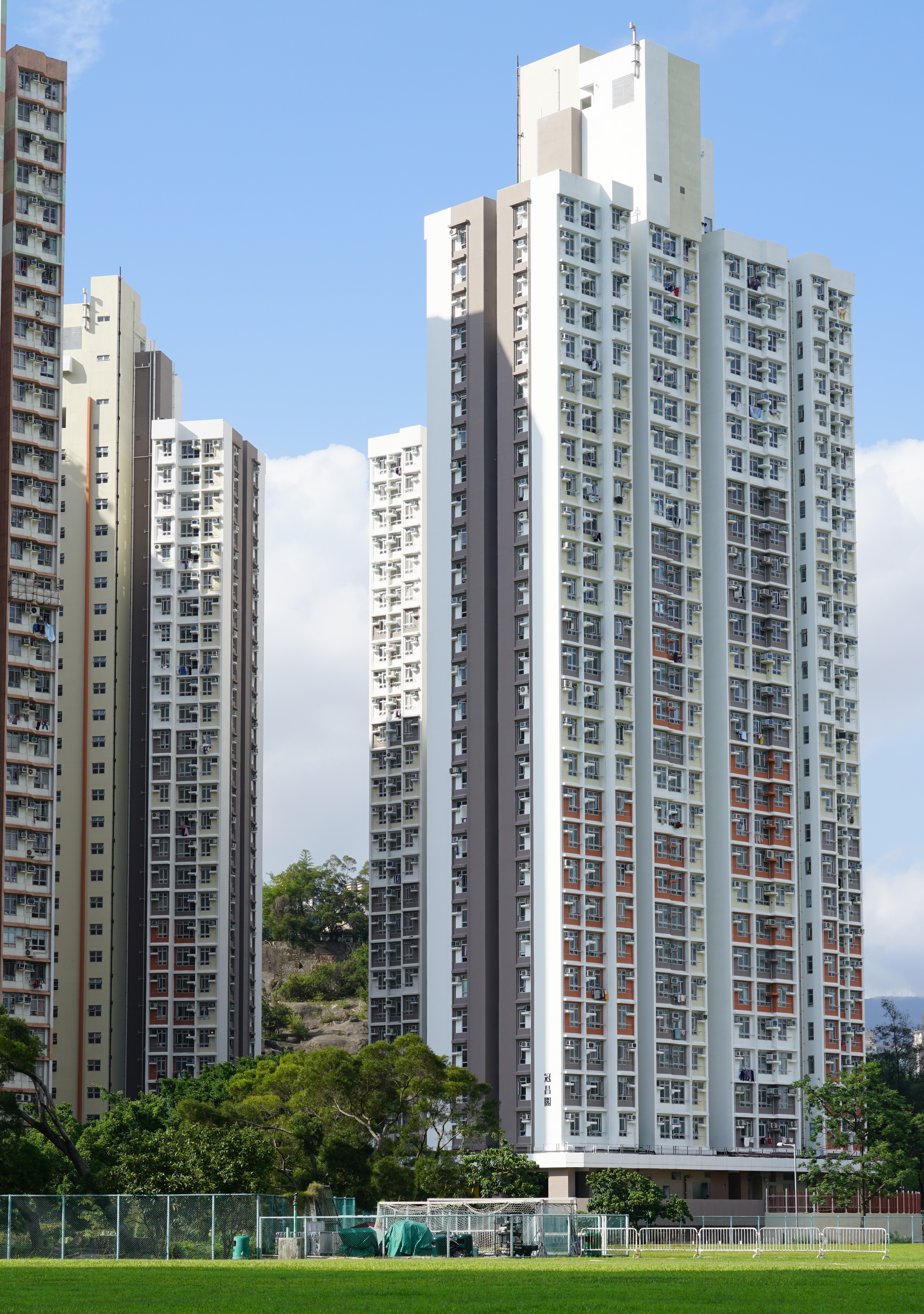
Kwun Tak Court.

Ho Man Tin Estate (Chinese: 何文田邨) is a public housing estate in Quarry Hill, Kowloon City District, Kowloon, Hong Kong. It consists of 9 residential blocks and a shopping arcade, including 8 blocks and the shopping arcade of Ho Man Tin (South) Estate (Chinese: 何文田(南)邨).

Kwun Fai Court (冠暉苑) is a Home Ownership Scheme court in Quarry Hill, next to Ho Man Tin Estate. It consists of 2 blocks built in 1999. The blocks were originally the rental housing of Ho Man Tin Estate, but they were converted to HOS housing finally and sold to the residents affected by the clearance of Valley Road Estate, Ho Man Tin Estate and Hung Hom Estate privately.

Kwun Hei Court (冠熹苑) is a Home Ownership Scheme court in Quarry Hill, next to Ho Man Tin Estate. It has 1 block built in 2000.

Kwun Tak Court (冠德苑) is a Home Ownership Scheme court in Sheung Tak Street, Ho Man Tin. It comprises 3 blocks with totally 603 flats in two sizes - 445 to 483 square feet and 562 to 568 square feet sold at an average price of HK$8,551 per square foot. It was completed in 2019.

== Background ==
Old Ho Man Tin Estate was located at the north of Quarry Hill, which had a total of 8 blocks completed in 1972, but it started redevelopment in the 2000s (decade). In 1997, a rest garden in the estate was reconstructed to a public housing building, King Man House. In 2000, another 8 buildings and a shopping arcade were built in Quarry Hill, the south of Old Ho Man Tin Estate, and named as Ho Man Tin (South) Estate.

== Houses ==
=== Ho Man Tin Estate ===
| Name | Type | Completion |
|---|---|---|
| King Man House | Harmony 1 | 1997-1998 |
| Yat Man House | Harmony 1 | 2000 |
| Choi Man House | Harmony 1 | 2000 |
| Sik Man House | Harmony 1 | 2000 |
| Yee Man House | Harmony 1 | 2000 |
| Ching Man House | Harmony 3B | 2000 |
| Tim Man House | Harmony 3B | 2000 |
| Yan Man House | Small Household Block | 2000 |
| Nga Man House | Small Household Block | 2000 |

=== Kwun Fai Court ===
| Name | Type | Completion |
|---|---|---|
| Ming Fai House | Harmony 3C | 1999 |
| Ko Fai House | Small Household Block | 1999 |

=== Kwun Hei Court ===
| Name | Type | Completion |
|---|---|---|
| Kwun Hei Court | Harmony 1 | 2000 |

=== Kwun Tak Court ===
| Name | Type | Completion |
|---|---|---|
| Kwun Cheong House (Block A) | Non-standard | 2019 |
| Kwun Shing House (Block B) | Non-standard | 2019 |
| Kwun Wing House (Block C) | Non-standard | 2019 |

== Education ==
Ho Man Tin Estate, including Kwun Hei Court, is in Primary One Admission (POA) School Net 34. Within the school net are multiple aided schools (operated independently but funded with government money) and two government schools: Farm Road Government Primary School and Ma Tau Chung Government Primary School.

== Transportation ==
Although Ho Man Tin station is a 10-minute walk away, many residents choose to take other means of public transport such as buses or minibuses, that take them directly to core areas of Kowloon, such as Mong Kok or Kowloon City.
