= San Shan Interchange =

San Shan Interchange Chinese: 新山交匯處
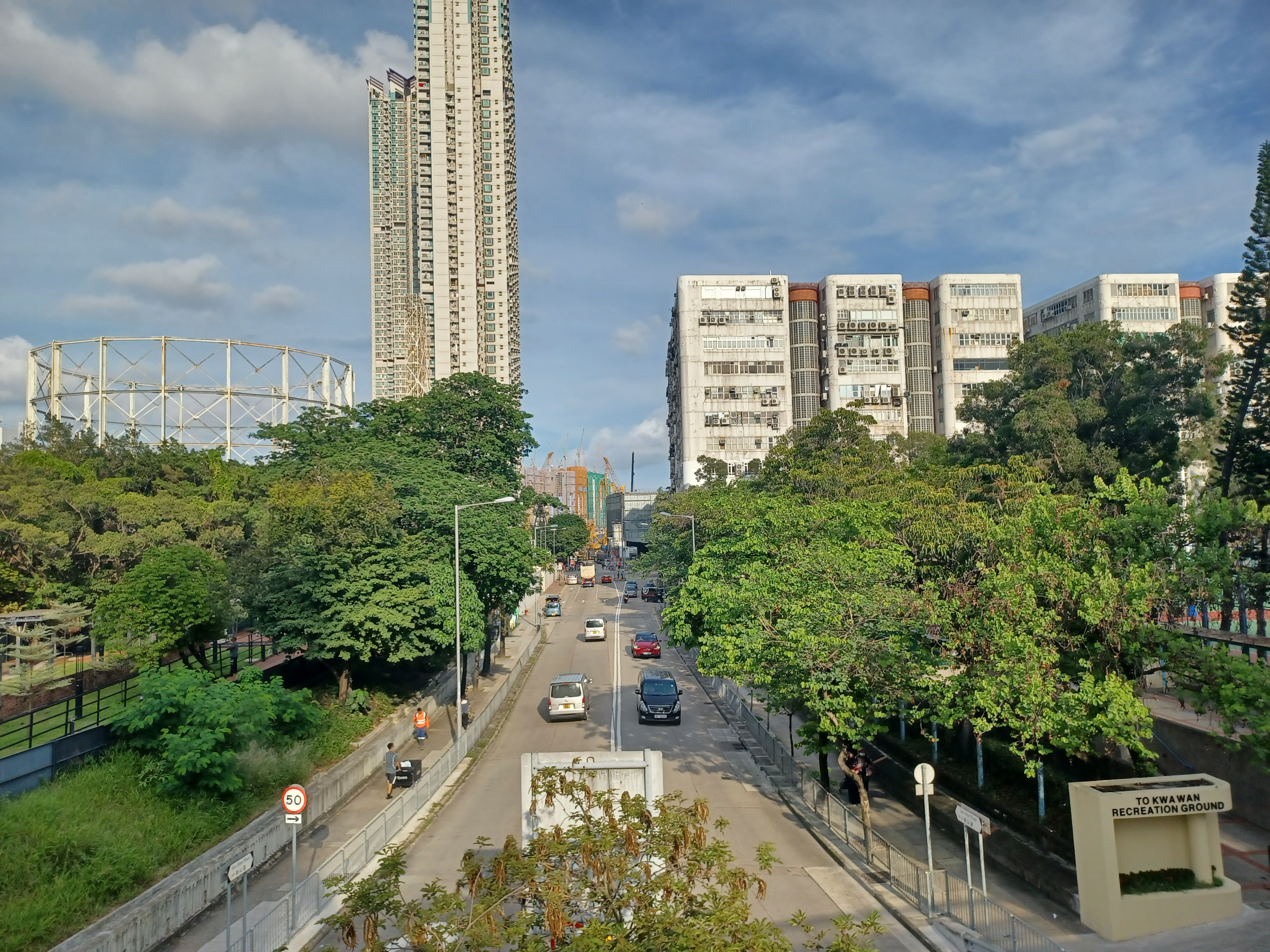
- San Shan Interchange facing east, with the ground-level San Shan Road in the foreground

Location
- West of Cattle Depot Artist Village, San Shan Road, Kowloon City District, Hong Kong
- Coordinates: 22°19′13.8″N 114°11′25.2″E
- Roads at junction: Route 5 (Kai Tak Tunnel and East Kowloon Corridor); Kowloon City Road; San Shan Road

Construction
- Type: Y-type interchange
- Constructed: June 1, 1977 by Kumagai Gumi
- Opened: June 29, 1982
- Maintained by: Highways Department

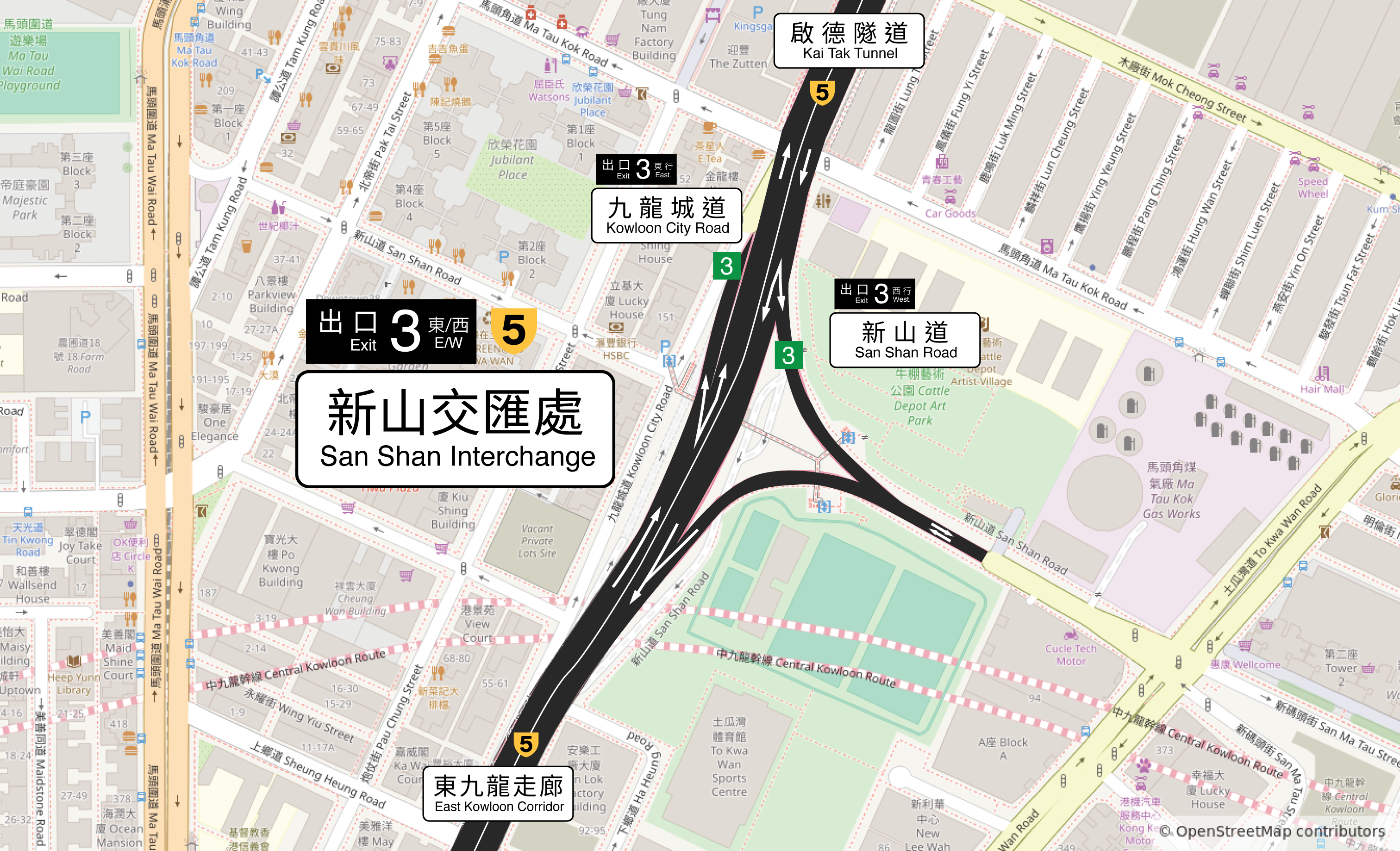
Map of San Shan Interchange

San Shan Interchange (Chinese: 新山交匯處) is a highway interchange located in Kowloon City District, Hong Kong, connecting the western exit of the Kai Tak Tunnel, San Shan Road, Kowloon City Road, and the East Kowloon Corridor viaduct.

== Overview ==
On October 19, 1976, the Hong Kong Public Works Department awarded a HK$45 million contract for the construction of San Shan Interchange to Kumagai Gumi (Hong Kong) Limited. The site was selected west of the Ma Tau Kok Quarantine Depot.

The construction period spanned 30 months. Key components included building a 280-meter-long tunnel structure to connect Kowloon City Road with the western portal of the Kai Tak Tunnel. The contract also covered the extension of San Shan Road to Kowloon City Road and road widening works at the Kowloon City Road interchange. Additionally, the project involved constructing multiple vehicular ramps to optimize traffic flow and enhance vehicular efficiency in the area.

The interchange opened on June 29, 1982, alongside the commissioning of the Kai Tak Tunnel.

== See also ==
- Kai Tak Tunnel
- East Kowloon Corridor
- Route 5
- Hong Kong Strategic Route and Exit Number System
