= To Kwa Wan Road =

Street in Hong Kong

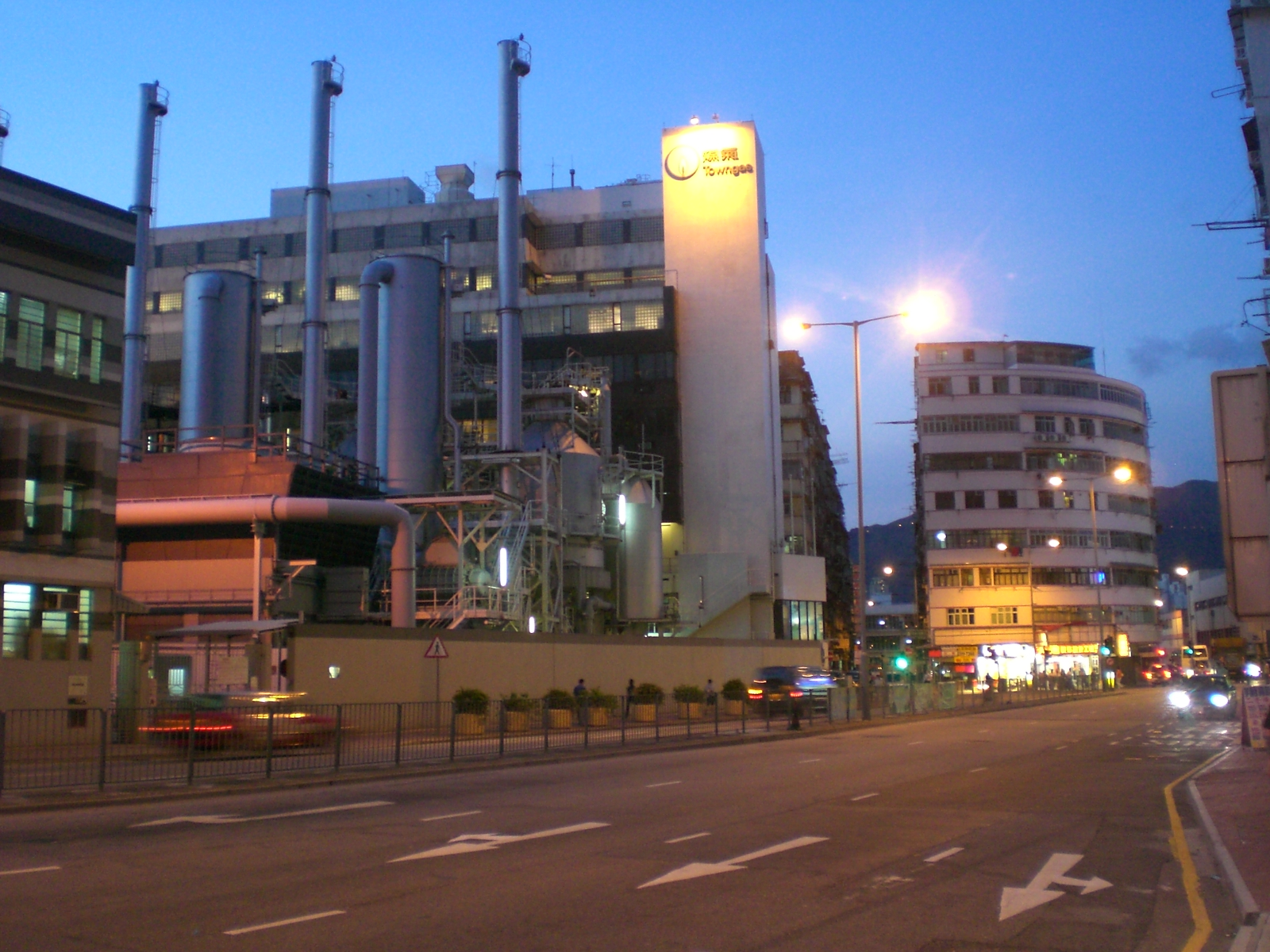
Ma Tau Kok Gas Works along To Kwa Wan Road.

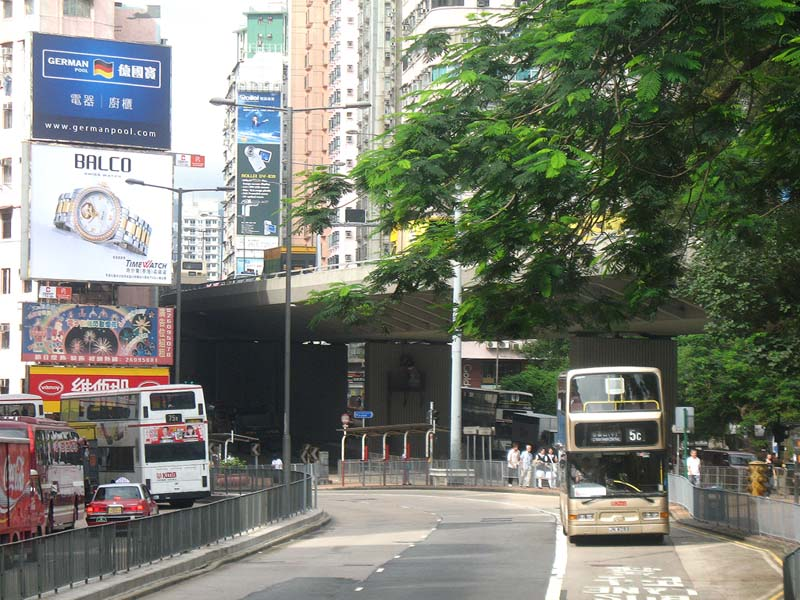
To Kwa Wan Road.

To Kwa Wan Road (Chinese: 土瓜灣道) is a major thoroughfare in To Kwa Wan, Kowloon, Hong Kong, connecting To Kwa Wan with Ma Tau Kok. In the past, To Kwa Wan Road was a coastal highway, named after its proximity to a small, To Kwa-shaped island.

== See also ==
- Grand Waterfront
- To Kwa Wan station
- 13 Streets
