= Route 5 (Hong Kong) =

Road in Hong Kong

Route 5

- Alignment and exits of Route 5 (zoom in to view exit details)

Route information
- Maintained by Highways Department
- Length: 17.9 km (11.1 mi)
- Existed: 29 October 1968 (Lai Chi Kok Bridge)–present

Major junctions
- East end: Route 7 in Ngau Tau Kok
- Route 2 near Kowloon Bay; Route 1 in Hung Hom; Route 7 in Lai King; Route 3 in Tsuen Wan
- West end: Route 9 near Chai Wan Kok

Location
- Country: China
- Special administrative region: Hong Kong
- Districts: Kwun Tong, Kowloon City, Yau Tsim Mong, Sham Shui Po, Kwai Tsing, Tsuen Wan

Highway system
- Transport in Hong Kong; Routes; Roads and Streets
← Route 4	→ Route 6

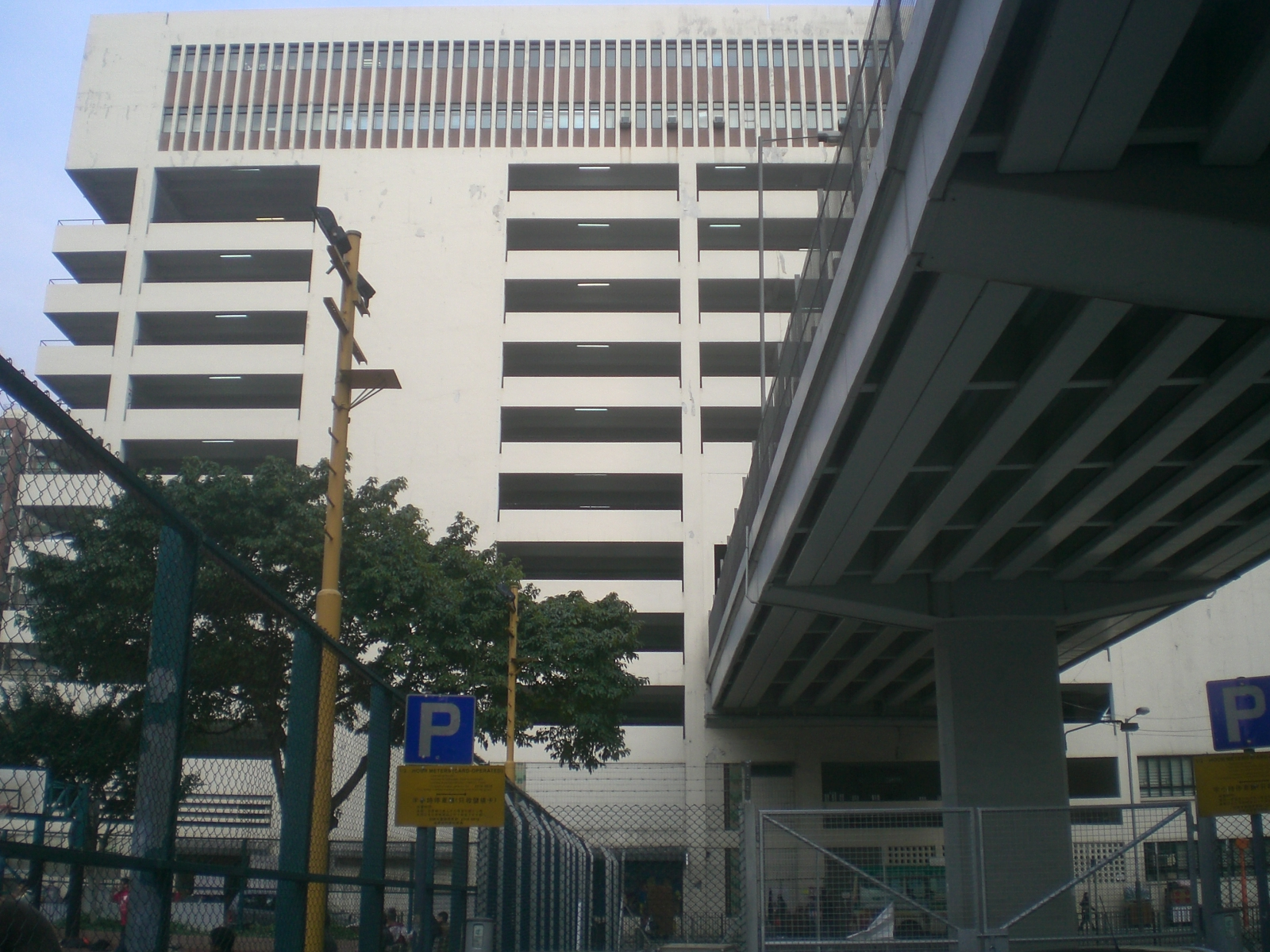
An overhead viaduct carries Route 5 through a parking garage in Yau Ma Tei

Route 5 (Chinese: 五號幹綫; Jyutping: ng5 hou6 gon3 sin3) is a strategic route in Hong Kong from eastern to western Kowloon and New Kowloon, and ends in Tsuen Wan in the New Territories where it connects to Route 9. It is one of the most seriously congested routes in Kowloon, especially during peak hours, as it serves as an interchange to the Hung Hom Cross-Harbour Tunnel.

Route 5 begins in the east from Kowloon Bay westwards via central Kowloon to Yau Ma Tei. From Yau Ma Tei, the road heads north to Tsuen Wan and meets Route 9. In the Tai Kok Tsui section of Route 5, where the route runs in south-north direction, the northbound and southbound lanes are separated, with the northbound and southbound flyovers running over two parallel roads (Tai Kok Tsui Road and Tong Mi Road respectively). It passes through Ngau Tau Kok, Kowloon Bay, Ma Tau Chung, Hung Hom, Yau Ma Tei, Lai Chi Kok, Kwai Chung and Tsuen Wan.

== Constituent roads ==
The following roads comprise route 5 (from east to west):

- Kai Fuk Road
- Kai Tak Tunnel
- East Kowloon Corridor
- Chatham Road North
- Chatham Road South
- Gascoigne Road Flyover
- West Kowloon Corridor
  - Ferry Street Flyover
  - Tong Mi Road Flyover
  - Tai Kok Tsui Road Flyover (West Kowloon Corridor West)
  - Tung Chau Street Flyover
- Lai Chi Kok Road
- Kwai Chung Road
  - Lai Chi Kok Bridge
- Tsuen Wan Road

== Observed roads and exits ==
District	Location	km	mi	Exit	Name	Destinations	Notes
Kwun Tong District	Ngau Tau Kok	Joins Route 7 (Kwun Tong Road)					
Kwun Tong District	Kowloon Bay	0.7	0.4	1A		Wai Yip Street – Kwun Tong Business Area	Eastbound exit only
Kwun Tong District	Kowloon Bay	1.3	0.8	1B		Sheung Yee Road – Cruise Terminal	Eastbound exit only
Kwun Tong District	Kowloon Bay	1.4	0.9	1C		Route 2 (Kwun Tong Bypass) – Tseung Kwan O, Hong Kong (East)	Eastbound exit only
Kwun Tong District	Kowloon Bay	1.5	0.9	1D		Wang Kwong Road – Kowloon Bay	Eastbound exit only
Kowloon City District	Kai Tak	1.8	1.1	2	Kai Tak Interchange	Kai Cheung Road – Kowloon Bay	Westbound exit
Kowloon City District	Kai Tak	2.1	1.3	2	Kai Tak Interchange	Kai Cheung Road – Sha Tin, Kowloon Bay	Eastbound exit
Kowloon City District	Kai Tak	2.1–3.4	1.3–2.1	Kai Tak Tunnel			
Kowloon City District	Ma Tau Kok	3.2	2.0	2A	San Shan Interchange	Sung Wong Toi Road – Kowloon City	Eastbound exit only
Kowloon City District	Ma Tau Kok	3.4	2.1	3	San Shan Interchange	Kowloon City Road – To Kwa Wan	Westbound exit
Kowloon City District	Ma Tau Kok	3.6	2.2	3	San Shan Interchange	San Shan Road – To Kwa Wan	Eastbound exit
Kowloon City District	Hung Hom	4.8	3.0	3A		Chatham Road North (Non-route part) – Kowloon City	Eastbound exit only
Kowloon City District	Hung Hom	4.9	3.0	4		Ping Chi Street – Ho Man Tin	Westbound exit
Kowloon City District	Hung Hom	4.9	3.0	4		Yan Fung Street – Ho Man Tin	Eastbound exit
Kowloon City District	Hung Hom	5.0	3.1	5		Wuhu Street – Hung Hom	Westbound exit
Kowloon City District	Hung Hom	5.0	3.1	5		Yan Fung Street – Ho Man Tin	Eastbound exit
Kowloon City District	Hung Hom	5.3	3.3	6		Route 1 (Hong Chong Road) – Hong Kong (Central), East Tsim Sha Tsui, Hung Hom Station	—
Kowloon City District	Hung Hom	5.6	3.5	6A		Chatham Road South (Non-route part) – Hong Kong Coliseum, Hung Hom, Tsim Sha Tsui	Westbound exit only
Yau Tsim Mong District	King's Park	5.7	3.5	6B		Gascoigne Road – Lantau Island, Hong Kong (West), Ho Man Tin, Yau Ma Tei	Westbound exit only
Yau Tsim Mong District	King's Park	5.9	3.7	6C		Gascoigne Road – Yau Ma Tei	Westbound exit only
Yau Tsim Mong District	Yau Ma Tei	6.8	4.2	6D		Ferry Street, Ngo Cheung Road – Yau Ma Tei, Mong Kok (West), Hong Kong (West)	Westbound exit only
Yau Tsim Mong District	Ferry Point	7.2	4.5	6E		Ferry Street – Tsim Sha Tsui, Airport Express, Hong Kong (West)	Eastbound exit only
Yau Tsim Mong District	Ferry Point	7.6	4.7	7A		Ferry Street – Mong Kok, Tai Kok Tsui, Sham Shui Po	Westbound exit only
Yau Tsim Mong District	Tai Kok Tsui	8.4	5.2	7B		Tong Mi Road – Yau Ma Tei	Eastbound exit only
Yau Tsim Mong District	Tai Kok Tsui	8.7	5.4	7C		Prince Edward Road West, Sycamore Street – Mong Kok	Eastbound exit only
Sham Shui Po District	Cheung Sha Wan	10.8	6.7	8B		Lai Chi Kok Road – Cheung Sha Wan	Eastbound exit only
Sham Shui Po District	Lai Chi Kok	11.3	7.0	8C		Cheung Sha Wan Road	Eastbound exit only
Sham Shui Po District	Lai Chi Kok	11.1	6.9	9		Yuet Lun Street, Lai Chi Kok Road – Mei Foo, Sha Tin	Westbound exit
Sham Shui Po District	Lai Chi Kok	11.7	7.3	9		Mei Lai Road, Cheung Sha Wan Road – Mei Foo, Sha Tin	Eastbound exit
Sham Shui Po District	Lai Chi Kok	11.4–12.2	7.1–7.6	Lai Chi Kok Bridge			
Kwai Tsing District	Kwai Chung	12.1	7.5	9A		Container Port Road South – Container Terminals	Westbound exit only
Kwai Tsing District	Kwai Chung	12.1	7.5	9A		Lai King Hill Road – Lai King, Princess Margaret Hospital (Hong Kong)	Westbound exit only
Kwai Tsing District	Kwai Chung	13.1	8.1	9B		Route 7 (Ching Cheung Road) – Sha Tin, Kwun Tong	Eastbound exit only
Kwai Tsing District	Kwai Chung	13.1	8.1	9B		Container Port Road South – Container Terminals, Lai King, Princess Margaret Hospital (Hong Kong)	Eastbound exit only
Kwai Tsing District	Kwai Chung	13.8	8.6	9C		Container Port Road South, Kwai Chung Road- Kwai Chung, Sha Tin	Westbound exit only
Kwai Tsing District	Kwai Chung	13.9	8.6	9D		Route 3 (Tsing Kwai Highway) – Tsim Sha Tsui, Hong Kong (West), Lantau Island	Eastbound exit only
Kwai Tsing District	Kwai Chung	14.2	8.8	10		Kwai Tsing Road, Hing Fong Road – Tsing Yi (South)	Westbound exit
Kwai Tsing District	Kwai Chung	15.0	9.3	10		Kwai Hei Street – Kwai Chung	Eastbound exit
Kwai Tsing District	Kwai Chung	15.0	9.3	10		Kwai Tsing Road, Hing Fong Road – Tsing Yi, Airport	Eastbound exit
Kwai Tsing District	Kwai Chung	15.5	9.6	11		Texaco Road, Tsing Tsuen Road – Airport Express	Westbound exit
Tsuen Wan District	Tsuen Wan	16.1	10.0	11		Texaco Road, Tsing Tsuen Road – Tsuen Wan (East), Sha Tin, Tsing Yi, Airport Express, Airport	Eastbound exit
Tsuen Wan District	Tsuen Wan	15.9	9.9	11A		Texaco Road – Tsuen Wan (East), Sha Tin, Shek Kong	Westbound exit only
Tsuen Wan District	Tsuen Wan	16.8	10.4	12		Tai Chung Road, Hoi Hing Road – Tsuen Wan (West), Tsuen Wan West Station	Westbound exit
Tsuen Wan District	Tsuen Wan	17.3	10.8	12		Tai Chung Road, Hoi Hing Road – Tsuen Wan (Central), Sha Tin	Eastbound exit
Tsuen Wan District	Chai Wan Kok	Joins Route 9 (Tuen Mun Road)					

== See also ==
- Route 6 (Hong Kong)
