= Fabienne Costa =

Australian jewelry designer

Fabienne Costa is an Australian jewelry designer and the designer, CEO and Creative Director of YCL Jewels. She was working on her nursing degree and was two units shy of graduating when she dropped out to focus on her jewelry full time. Her jewelry was featured in the April and May 2014 editions of British Vogue magazine. Her jewelry has been worn by Elena Perminova, Jennifer Hawkins and Lorde and Delta Goodrem. She opened her first showroom in Australia in 2018 and she ships to over 90 countries around the world.
