= Chatham Road =

Road in Hong Kong

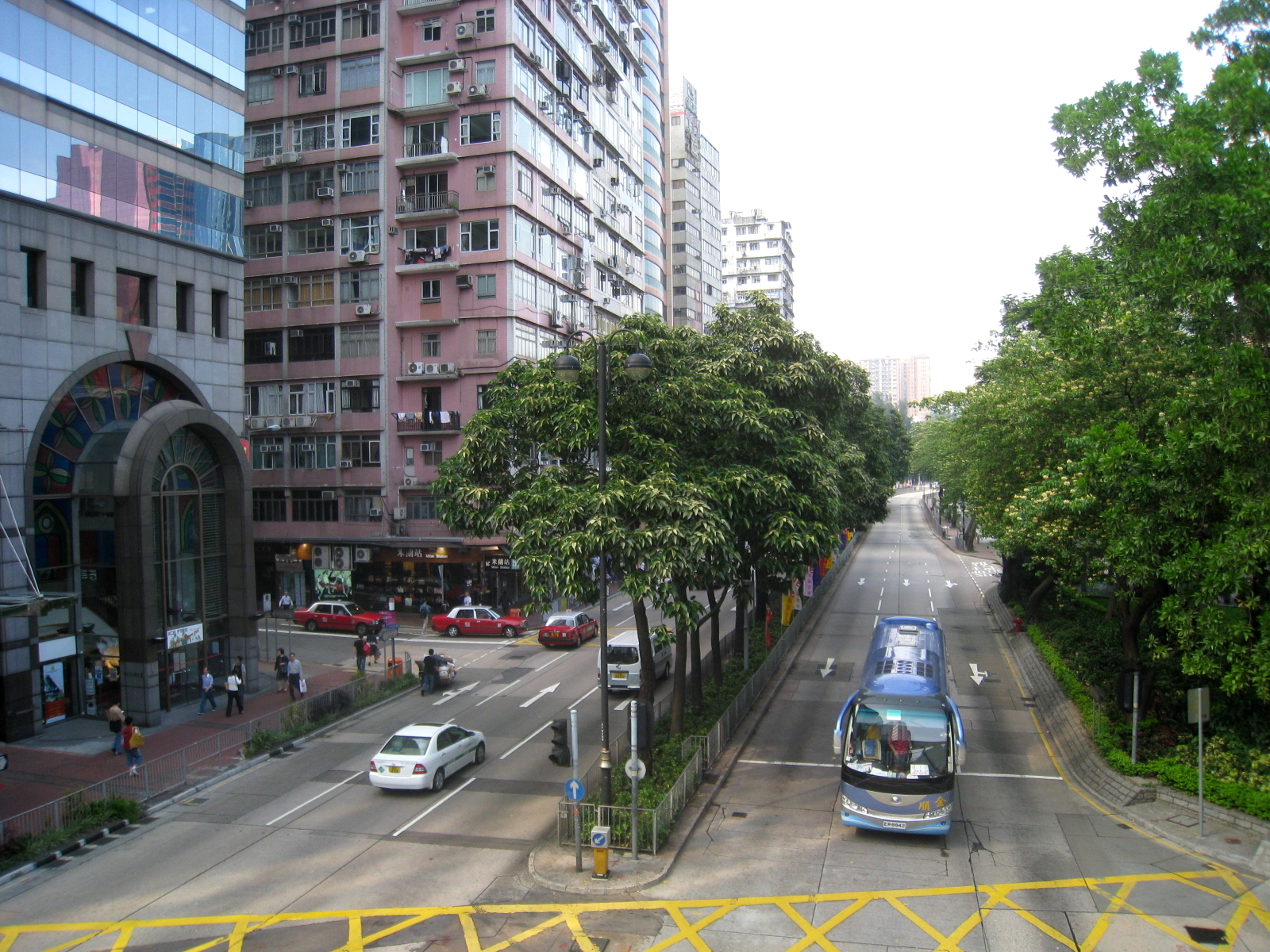
- Chatham Road South in May 2009
- Interactive map of Chatham Road
- Native name: 漆咸道 (Yue Chinese)
- Former name: Des Voeux Road
- Part of: Route 5
- Namesake: William Chatham
- Location: Kowloon, Hong Kong
- Coordinates: 22.30387°N 114.17796°E

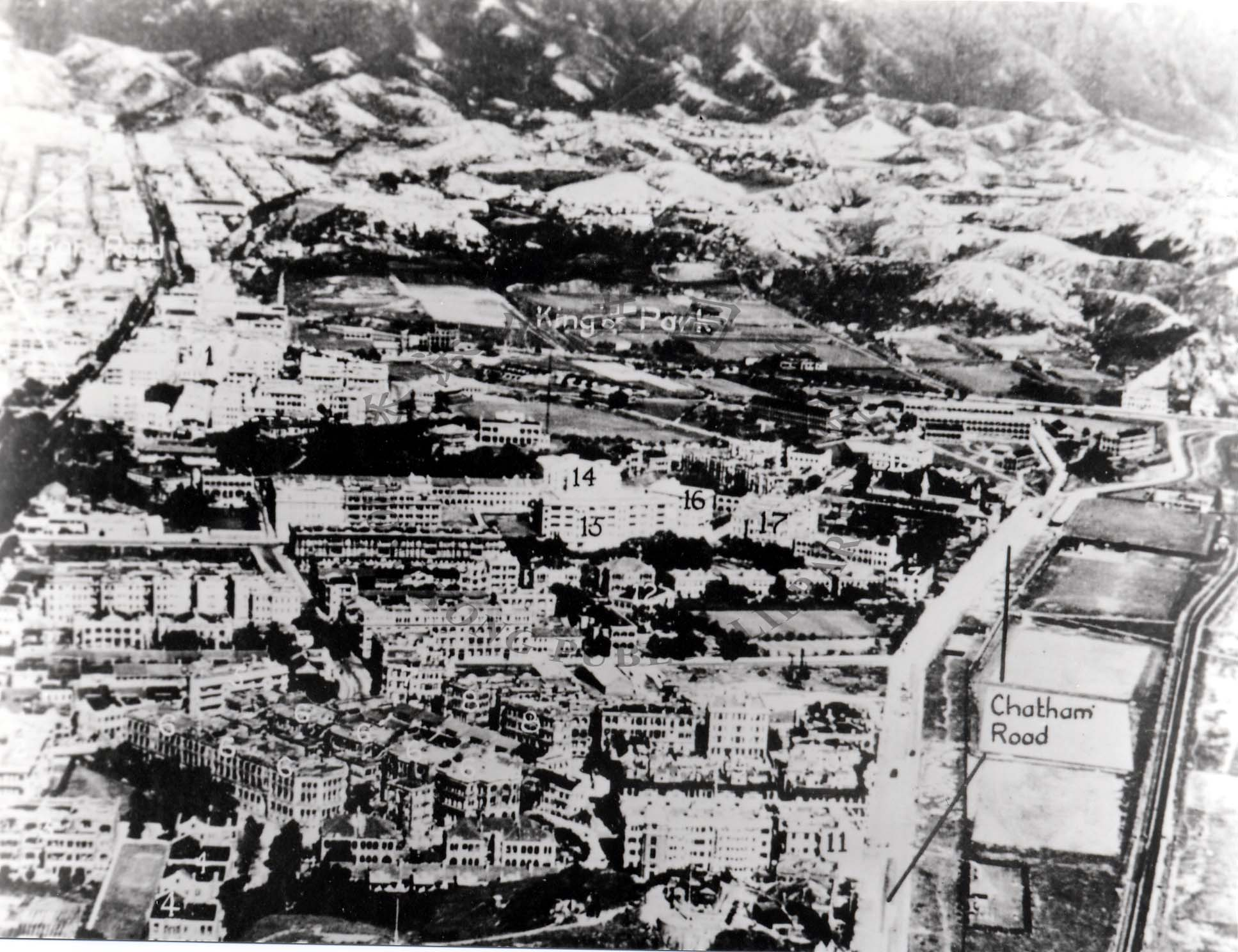
Chatham Road (right) and parts of Kowloon c.1930

Chatham Road South (Chinese: 漆咸道南; Jyutping: cat1 haam4 dou6 naam4) and Chatham Road North (漆咸道北; cat1 haam4 dou6 bak1) are two continuous roads extending from Tsim Sha Tsui to Hung Hom in Kowloon, Hong Kong. The road originally ran from Signal Hill to Hung Hom, under No. 12 Hill by the side of Hung Hom Bay. It was later extended through Lo Lung Hang to the southern end of To Kwa Wan, which makes up Chatham Road North.

== Route ==
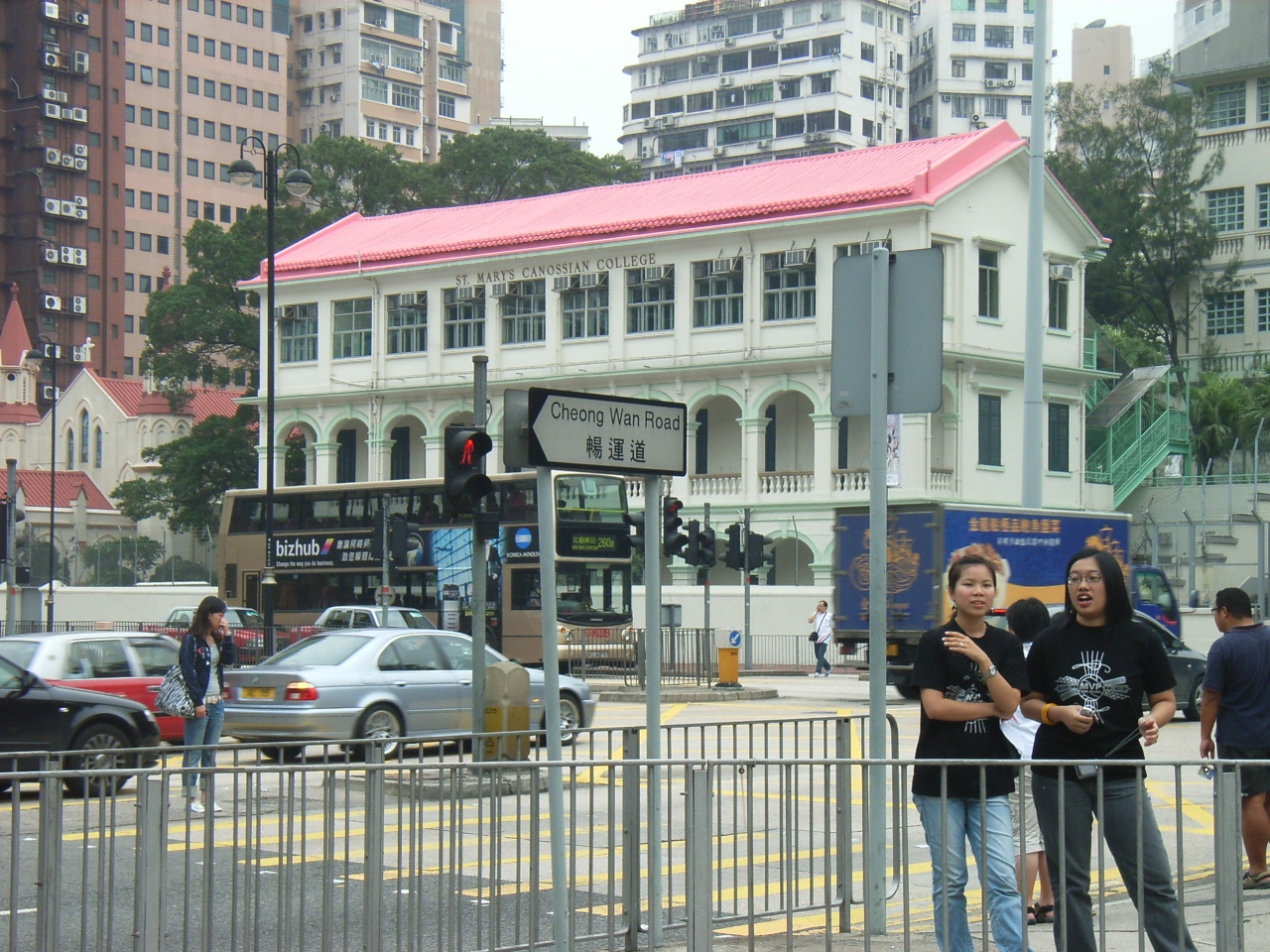
St. Mary's located in Chatham Road South in September 2006

Chatham Road South (漆咸道南) runs from the intersection with Salisbury Road in Tsim Sha Tsui to the interchange with Hong Chong Road (康莊道) and Chatham Road North in Hung Hom. Conventionally locals take Chatham Road South as the dividing line between Tsim Sha Tsui and Tsim Sha Tsui East. Hong Kong Polytechnic University, Hong Kong Museum of History, Hong Kong Science Museum, Gun Club Hill Barracks and Rosary Church are located near the road.

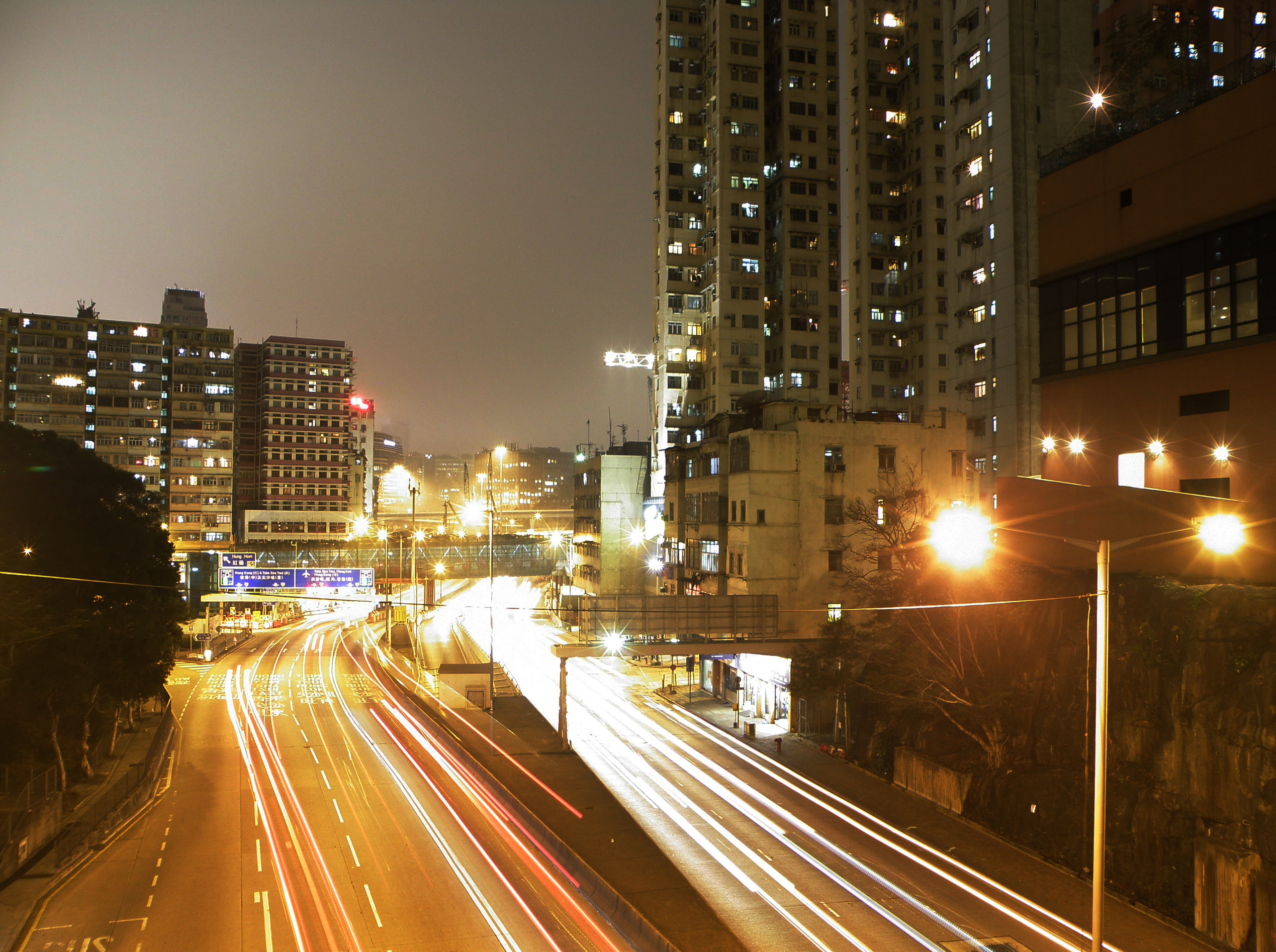
Chatham Road North at night in February 2015

Chatham Road North (漆咸道北) runs from the interchange with Hong Chong Road and Chatham Road South in Lo Lung Hang to the junction with Ma Tau Wai Road near To Kwa Wan. It feeds into the East Kowloon Corridor at its northern end, forming a section of Hong Kong's Route 5.

== History ==
The first section of the road (running from Salisbury Road to Granville Road) was completed in 1888, and was named Des Voeux Road (德輔道) after Sir George William Des Vœux, the 10th Governor of Hong Kong. The road was renamed "Chatham Road" in 1890, after William Chatham, Director of Public Works of Hong Kong Government; the name Des Voeux Road was later transferred to a series of Des Voeux Road newly completed along the north shore of Hong Kong Island.

== See also ==
- List of streets and roads in Hong Kong

Preceded by East Kowloon Corridor	Hong Kong Route 5 Chatham Road	Succeeded by West Kowloon Corridor
