= Kai Tak Tunnel =

Tunnel in Kowloon, Hong Kong

Coordinates: 22°19′28″N 114°11′38″E

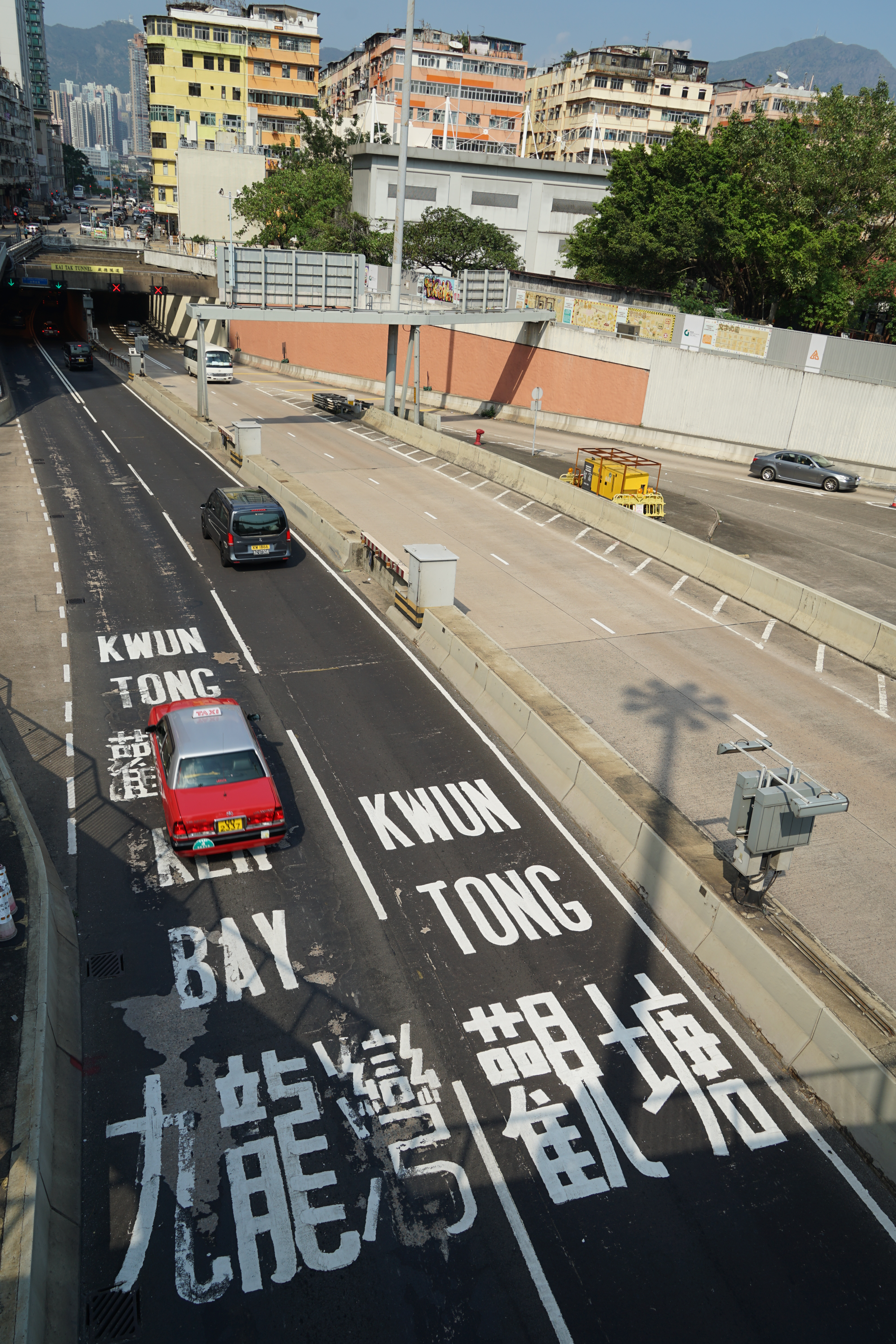
- Interactive map of Kai Tak Tunnel

Overview
- Official name: Kai Tak Tunnel
- Other name: Airport Tunnel
- Location: Kowloon, Hong Kong
- Status: Active
- Route: Part of Route 5
- Start: Ma Tau Kok
- End: Kowloon Bay

Operation
- Opened: 29 June 1982; 44 years ago
- Operator: Great Lucky Company Limited
- Traffic: Vehicular
- Character: Limited-access
- Toll: No

Technical
- No. of lanes: 4 lanes (2 lanes per direction)
- Operating speed: 70 km/h (43 mph)

Chinese name
- Traditional Chinese: 啟德隧道
- Simplified Chinese: 启德隧道
- Jyutping: Kai2 dak1 seoi6 dou6
- Cantonese Yale: Kái dāk seuih douh
- Hanyu Pinyin: Qǐdé Suìdào
Transcriptions
Standard Mandarin
- Hanyu Pinyin: Qǐdé Suìdào
Yue: Cantonese
- Yale Romanization: Kái dāk seuih douh
- Jyutping: Kai2 dak1 seoi6 dou6

Airport Tunnel
- Traditional Chinese: 機場隧道
- Simplified Chinese: 机场隧道
- Jyutping: Gei1 coeng4 seoi6 dou6
- Cantonese Yale: Gēi chèuhng seuih douh
Transcriptions
Yue: Cantonese
- Yale Romanization: Gēi chèuhng seuih douh
- Jyutping: Gei1 coeng4 seoi6 dou6

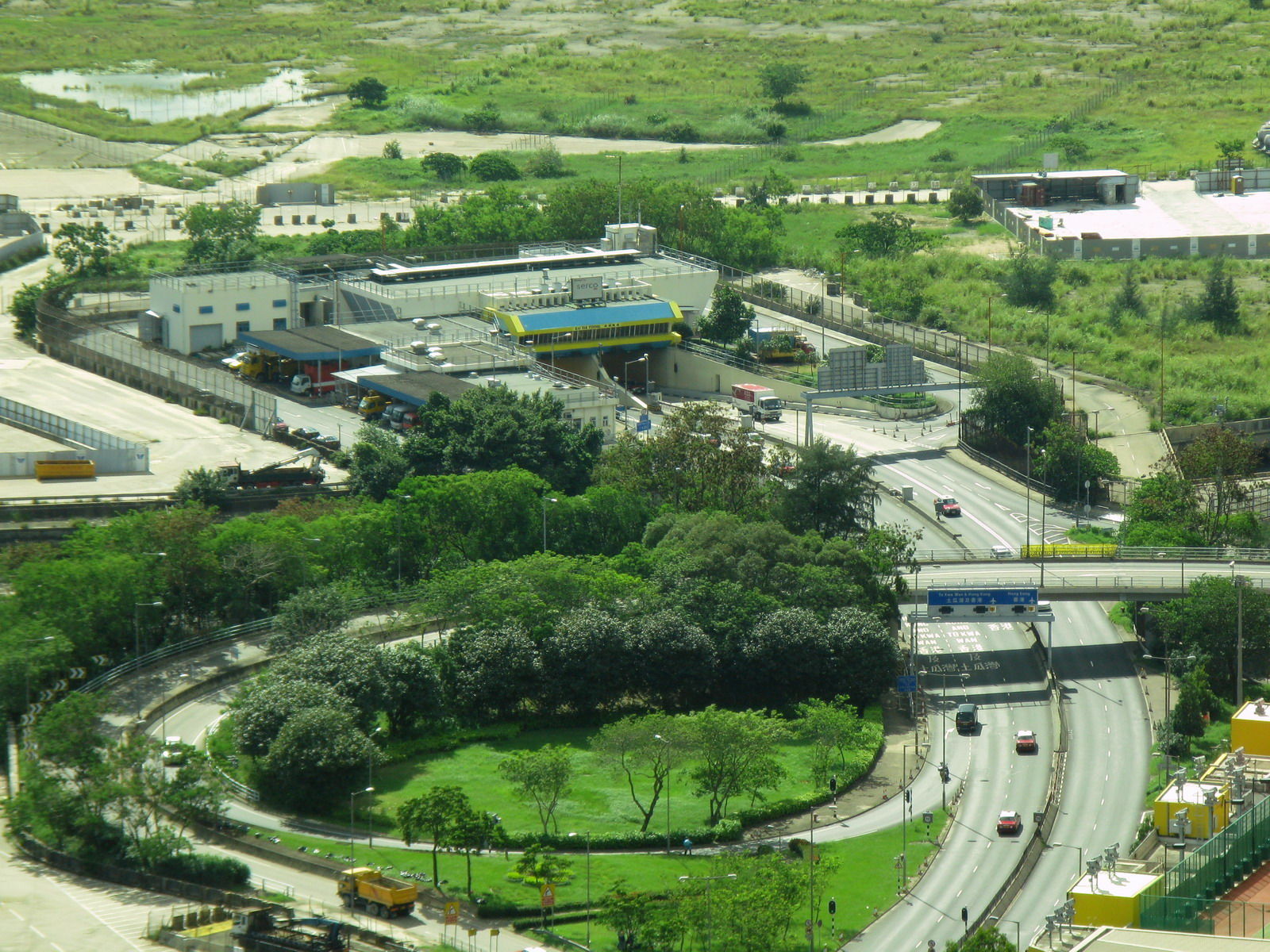
Kai Tak Tunnel Kowloon Bay entrance

Kai Tak Tunnel, formerly known as the Airport Tunnel, is a tunnel in New Kowloon, Hong Kong, which connects the Kowloon Bay and Ma Tau Kok areas by going beneath the former Hong Kong International Airport (Kai Tak Airport). It is part of Route 5.

The tunnel provides a quick link between the two ends of the tunnel, as before the construction of the tunnel vehicles had to detour through Kowloon City to reach the other end. Kai Tak Tunnel is currently managed by Greater Lucky (H.K.) Company Limited.

== History ==
Construction of the tunnel had started by 1975, but because of the difficulties in digging under the airport runway, it was not complete until 1982. The southern tube opened to two-way traffic at 3:00 pm on 29 June 1982. The second (northern) tube opened on 8 October that year. The Airport Tunnel was the first tunnel in Hong Kong to be toll-free, excluding short underpasses.

With Kai Tak Airport's shutdown in 1998, the Airport Tunnel was no longer fulfilled to its name. The Hong Kong Government announced to rename to Kai Tak Tunnel on 2 March 2006 that the tunnel, effective from 4 May 2006, after several years of consultation with groups including the Kowloon City District Council. The name was changed to commemorate the former Kai Tak International Airport.

== Features ==
The tunnel consists of a pair of tubes of about 7 metres diameter each, 1.26 km long. The southern tube carries west-bound traffic from Kowloon Bay to Ma Tau Kok. A point of interest is that the eastbound tunnel branches off onto Sung Wong Toi Road. It is the only major vehicular tunnel in Hong Kong built entirely by the cut-and-cover technique.

Many major express bus routes of Kowloon Motor Bus and Citybus (formerly New World First Bus between Kowloon and the eastern end of New Kowloon travel through the Kai Tak Tunnel. Most of them run between the Kwun Tong District or Sai Kung District and Tsim Sha Tsui and Hung Hom. They include 13X, 213X, 224X, 98D, 98P, 14X, 215X, 219X, 296D, 297, 796P. Westbound departures of routes 11X and 28 and peak hour cross harbour tunnel bus route 101X and Hong Kong High Speed Rail feeder bus route W2, also runs through Kai Tak Tunnel. In total, an estimated 60000 vehicles use the tunnel each day.

Preceded by Kai Fuk Road	Hong Kong Route 5 Kai Tak Tunnel	Succeeded by East Kowloon Corridor
