= 13 Streets =

Area in Hong Kong

13 Streets Chinese: 十三街
- Area
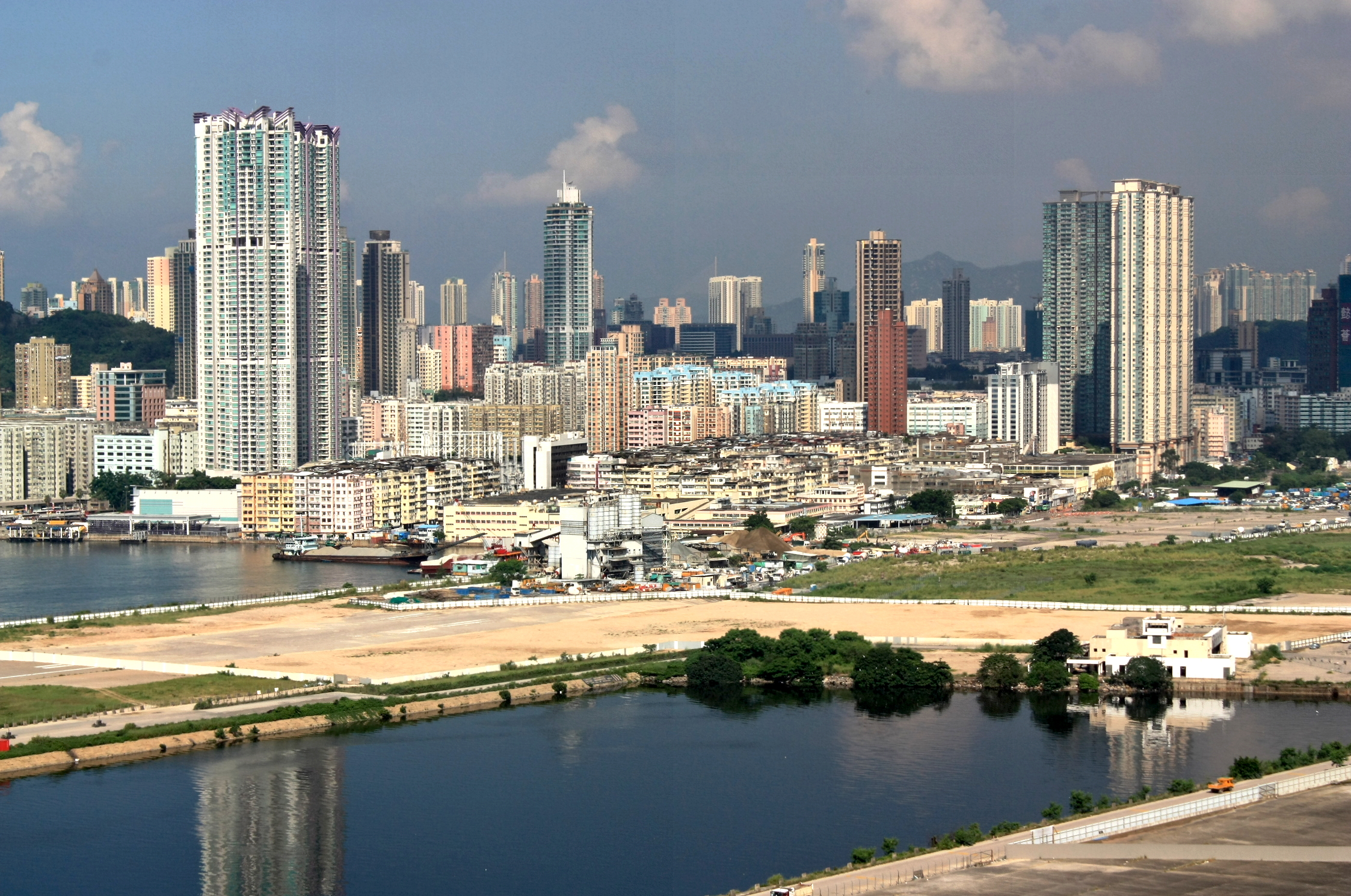
- 13 Streets (foreground)

- Location within Hong Kong
- Coordinates: 22°19′18.84″N 114°11′33.04″E
- Country: People's Republic of China
- Special administrative region: Hong Kong
- District: Kowloon City
- Place: Ma Tau Kok
- Time zone: UTC+8:00 (HKT)

The 13 Streets (Chinese: 十三街) is an area in Ma Tau Kok, Kowloon City District, Hong Kong. It consists of rows of late 1950s tenement buildings along 11 parallel short streets named after auspicious animals. The area is known for its abundance of ground floor garages (repair works).

== History ==
In 1900, the area was a timber yard. It was subsequently purchased by the Hong Kong Rope Factory to build a new factory in 1924. After World War II, a cotton mill and a vacuum flask factory replaced the rope factory.

During the mid-1950s to early 1960s, Hong Kong witnessed a sharp increase in population, stimulating real estate developers to build more domestic units. It was in this period from 1959 to 1961 that San Nam Yang Construction and Investment Company Ltd. Built a large cluster of seven-storey residential blocks at the 13 streets. Originally alphabetically named Block A to L, many of the residents of these blocks come from grass-roots class backgrounds, units are often subdivided and rented to more than one tenant.

Although the blocks were designed mainly for residential purpose in mind, in the 1960s the ground floors of these blocks were filled with garages. some of these garages still remain in operation today.

== Orientation ==
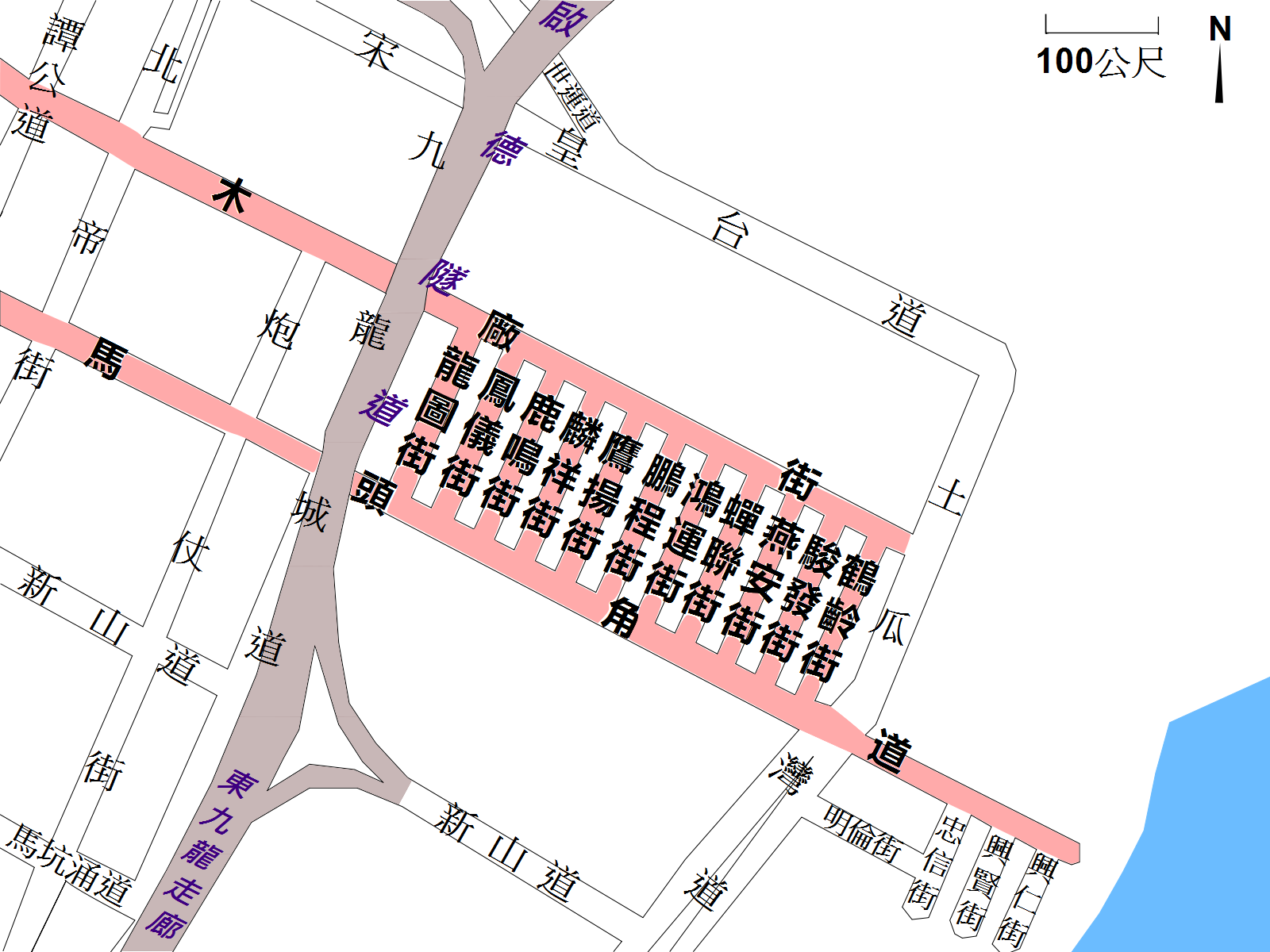
Map of the 13 Streets area.

It consists of 11 parallel short streets, bordered by Kowloon City Road (west), To Kwa Wan Road (east), Mok Cheong Street (north) and Ma Tau Kok Road (south). Their names are related to auspicious animals or legendary creatures, namely dragon, phoenix, deer, unicorn, eagle, lark, egret, cicada, swallow, horse, and crane.

There are 83 buildings in the 13 Streets area, built between 1958 and 1960. They contain a total of about 2,500 residential flats and 418 shops at the street level. Due to lack of maintenance, the buildings are in a dilapidated condition.

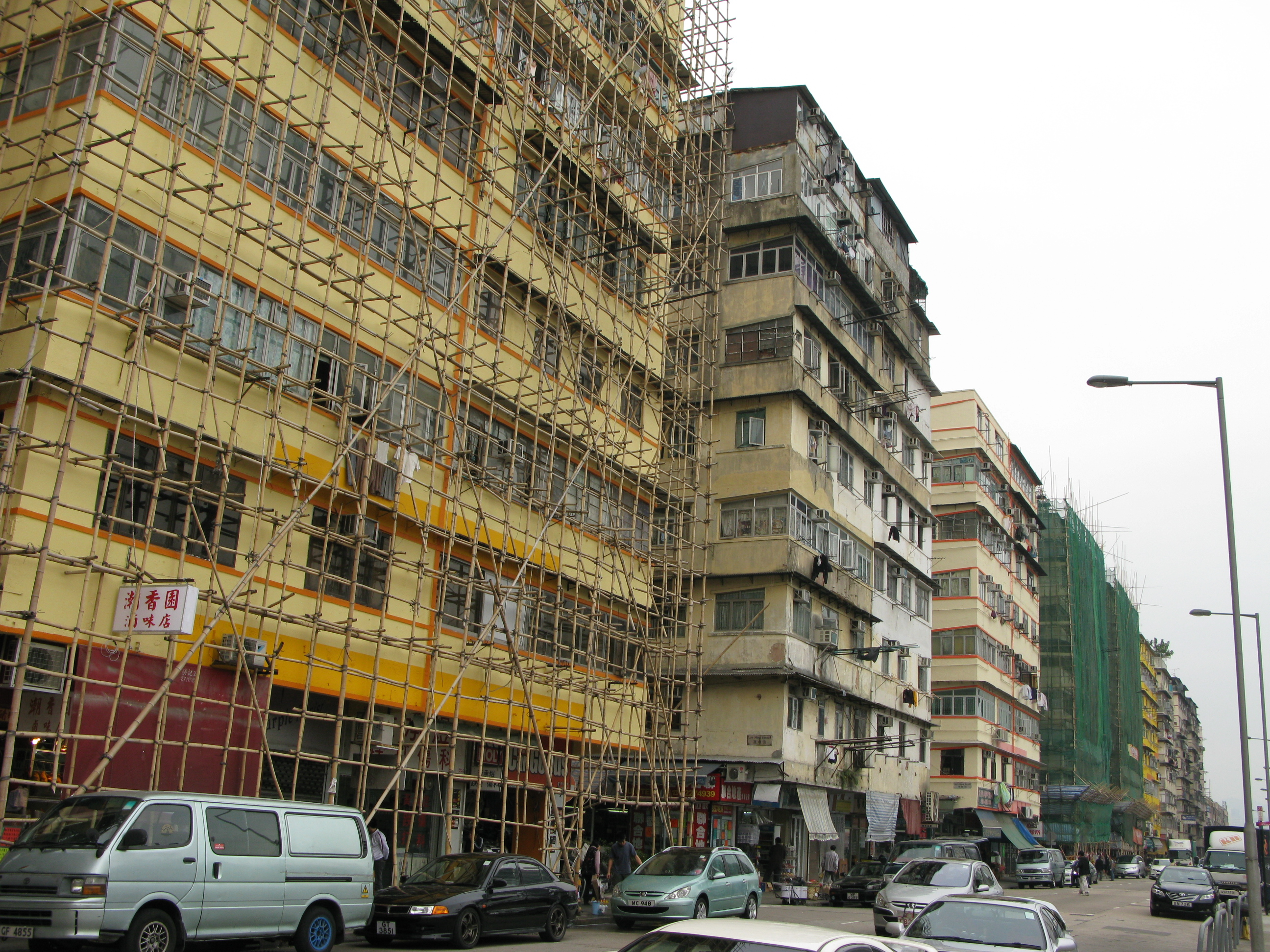
Section of the 13 Streets, viewed from the vicinity of the Cattle Depot Artist Village, across Ma Tau Kok Road.

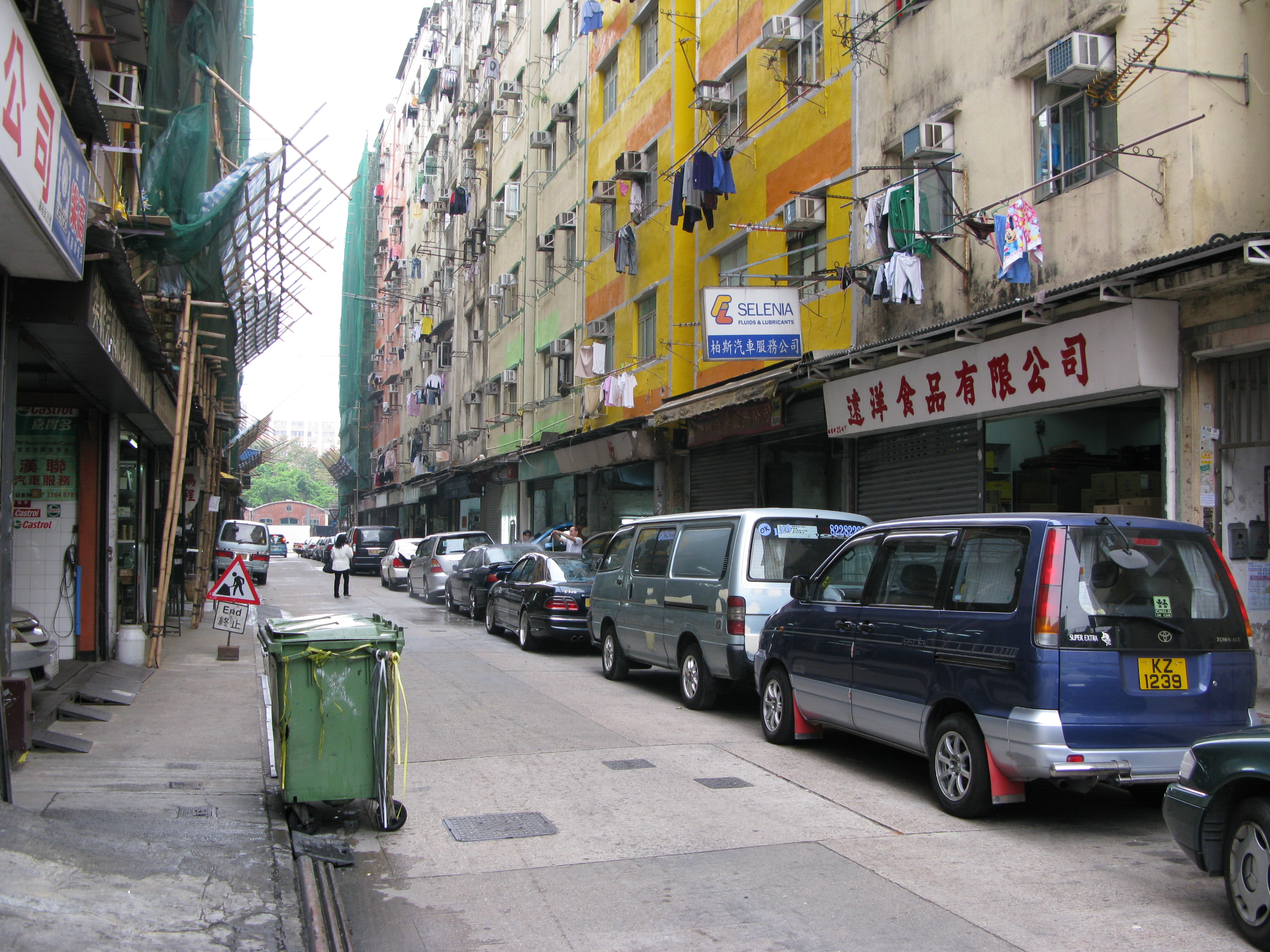
Pang Ching Street.

The 11 parallel streets are, from west to east:

- Lung To Street (龍圖街)
- Fung Yi Street (鳳儀街)
- Luk Ming Street (鹿鳴街)
- Lun Cheung Street (麟祥街)
- Ying Yeung Street (鷹揚街)
- Pang Ching Street (鵬程街)
- Hung Wan Street (鴻運街)
- Shim Luen Street (蟬聯街)
- Yin On Street (燕安街)
- Tsun Fat Street (駿發街)
- Hok Ling Street (鶴齡街)

== Redevelopment ==
Due to deteriorating building conditions, since 2014-15 redevelopment of the 13 Streets have been proposed by the Urban Renewal Authority. But due to lack of sufficient funds, and various difficulties including safety hazards from the adjacent Ma Tau Kok Gas Plant, redevelopment plans have been delayed.

Residents' opinions on the 13 streets redevelopment have been mixed. Some residents who have been living there since the 1960s oppose the redevelopment, saying that they are used to their established communities. Conversely, in 2024, a DAB campaign to urge authorities to speed up the redevelopment process amassed 1000 signatures from To Kwa Wan residents. Some residents blame the deteriorating conditions of the flats on the government's neglect, fearing a similar disaster to the collapse in 2010.

== See also ==
- Cattle Depot Artist Village
