= Jennifer Hawkins =

Australian model, host and beauty queen (born 1983)

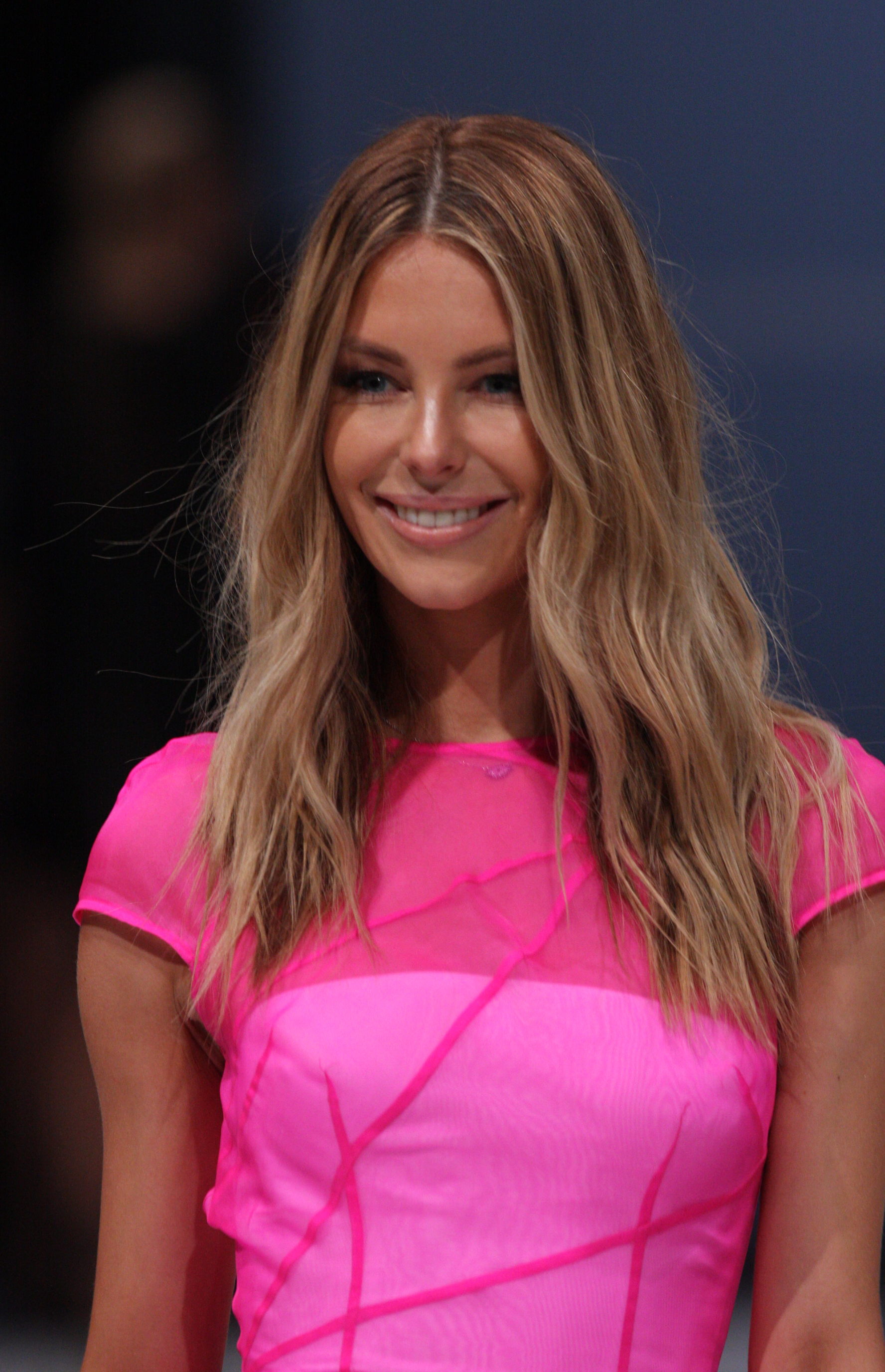
- Hawkins in 2015
- Born: Jennifer Louise Hawkins; 22 December 1983 (age 42); Newcastle, New South Wales, Australia
- Occupations: Model, presenter
- Height: 180 cm (5 ft 11 in)
- Spouse: Jake Wall (m. 2013)
- Children: 2
- Beauty pageant titleholder
- Title: Miss Universe Australia 2004; Miss Universe 2004
- Years active: 2003–present
- Hair color: Blonde
- Eye color: Blue
- Major competitions: Miss Universe Australia 2004 (Winner); Miss Universe 2004 (Winner)

Jennifer Louise Hawkins-Wall (née Hawkins; born 22 December 1983) is an Australian TV host, model and beauty queen who was crowned Miss Universe 2004. She had previously been crowned Miss Universe Australia 2004. She was the host of Australia's Next Top Model, and was brand ambassador for Lovable Intimates, Mount Franklin Lightly Sparkling and Range Rover, and formerly the face of Australian department store Myer.

== Early life ==
Hawkins was born in Holmesville, New South Wales, to Gail and Robert. She attended West Wallsend High School in West Wallsend, New South Wales. She is one of four siblings. Hawkins was a cheerleader for the Newcastle Knights rugby league team, and the Hunter Pirates basketball team and also worked as a model. It was as a model that she was cast as Miss Australia for the Miss Universe competition. Hawkins also worked as a choreographer for a dance team that toured Australia specialising in Hip Hop and Ballet.

== Career ==
=== Miss Universe ===
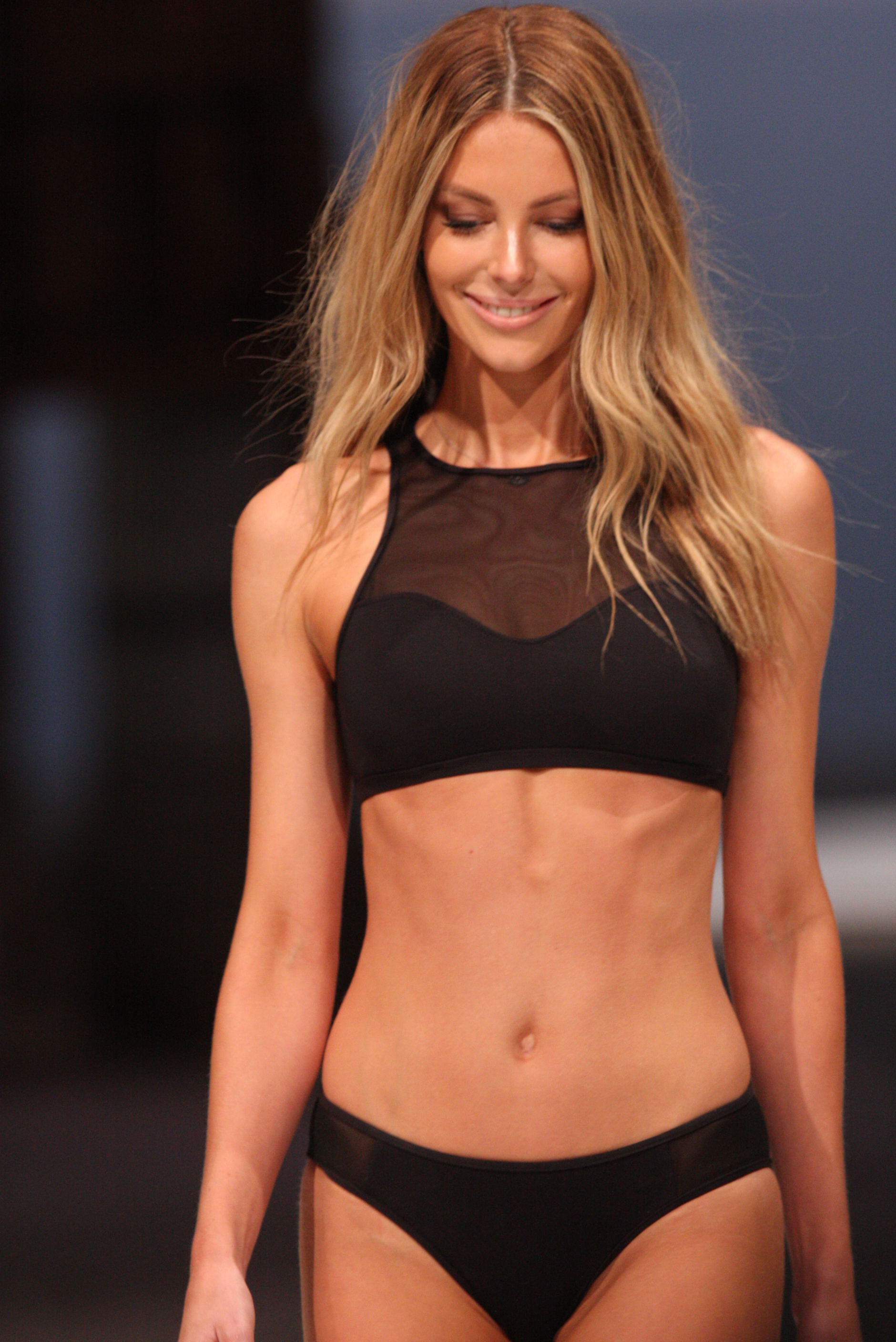
Hawkins in Sydney in August 2015

Before participating in Miss Universe 2004, Hawkins sought advice from the previous Miss Universe Australia, Ashlea Talbot, who represented Australia in the 2003 competition, and learned basic Spanish prior to travelling to Ecuador.

The Miss Universe pageant was held in Quito, Ecuador, on 1 June 2004. A week prior to the event, Hawkins was ranked sixth favourite to win the crown. During the final competition, she became the first Australian to make the semi-finals since Voni Delfos in 1993. She then proceeded to the top ten after competing in the evening gown competition, where she wore an unusual vintage copper gown that was designed by Bora and cost A$25,000. After the swimsuit competition, Hawkins advanced to the top five, and eventually won the Miss Universe title. The remaining top five were all delegates from the Americas and Caribbean, including Shandi Finnessey of the USA (1st runner-up), Alba Reyes of Puerto Rico (2nd runner-up), Yanina Gonzalez of Paraguay (3rd runner-up) and Danielle Jones of Trinidad and Tobago (4th runner-up). Hawkins was the second winner from Oceania since Lorraine Downes of New Zealand held the title in 1983, and the second Australian since Kerry Anne Wells who was crowned in Dorado, Puerto Rico in 1972 (coincidentally, both women were crowned in Spanish speaking countries).

Hawkins was crowned by outgoing titleholder Amelia Vega from the Dominican Republic, after being announced by host Billy Bush as the "thunder from down under".

Hawkins received an elaborate Mikimoto pearl encrusted crown, worth $250,000, as well as an extensive prize package. Hawkins was the first blonde-haired woman to win the title since Angela Visser of the Netherlands in 1989.

As Miss Universe, Hawkins represented the Miss Universe Organization. Her "sister" 2004 titleholders were Shelley Hennig (Miss Teen USA, of Louisiana) and Shandi Finnessey (Miss USA, of Missouri). During her reign, Hawkins travelled to Korea, The Bahamas, Brazil, Czech Republic, Germany, Greece, Singapore, Indonesia, Canada, Trinidad and Tobago, India, Ecuador, Mexico, Puerto Rico, had multiple trips to Thailand, the host of Miss Universe 2005, and her home country of Australia. In Brazil, after an official meeting with Vice-President José Alencar, he said she was "the prettiest girl I have ever seen in my life". Also, she was the first Miss Universe ever to parade in a Samba School (as Eve) during Brazilian carnival, in February 2005.

As part of her year-long reign as Miss Universe, she lived in New York City in a riverside apartment provided by the Miss Universe Organization. At this time, Hawkins stated that her wish was to continue modelling and become a television presenter.

Shortly after being crowned Miss Universe in 2004, Hawkins created news during a fashion show at Westfield Miranda, an Australian shopping centre, when she tripped on the hem of her dress, which fell to the floor. Hawkins was left scantily clad in her red g-string in front of a surprised crowd. Hawkins later apologised, laughingly adding she "wished she wore better underwear". The incident received the dubious distinction of being named "The most embarrassing moment ever shown on Australian television" by Australia's Nine Network. The "wardrobe malfunction" was widely circulated through news outlets and according to Google, caused a sharp increase in internet searches for "Jennifer Hawkins".

Hawkins served as a judge for the Miss Universe 2008 finals in Vietnam.

=== Television presenting ===
Hawkins signed a contract with the Seven Network at the 2004 Melbourne Cup Carnival. Her first appearances were as a guest presenter on the network's travel show, The Great Outdoors, where she took viewers on tours throughout the world. When she ended her reign as Miss Universe, she became a regular presenter on the show, which resulted in a 2006 Logie nomination for Most Popular New Female Talent. No new episodes of the programme have been produced since 2009.

Hawkins also served as the host and one of the judges for Australia's Make Me a Supermodel, which debuted on the Seven Network in August 2008. The series aired for a single season.

Media outlets reported in October 2010 that Hawkins would depart Seven and move to the Nine Network after the expiration of her contract.

Hawkins became the host for the hit TV show Australia's Next Top Model, replacing Sarah Murdoch.

=== Other ===
Hawkins was one of the participants in the fourth season of Australia's Dancing with the Stars and was the fifth celebrity eliminated. On 15 February 2006, she was in a celebrity version of Deal or No Deal called Dancing with the Deal which featured celebrities from Dancing with the Stars. She won $2,000 after refusing every deal.

Hawkins is featured as the love interest of Australian artist, Guy Sebastian in the music video for the second single "Elevator Love" off his third album, Closer to the Sun.

=== Timeline ===
- In July 2005, Hawkins was signed by personal hygiene and skincare brand Lux as its face of Australia and New Zealand.
- In September 2006, Hawkins signed a 3-year deal with Lovable Australia lingerie as its Australian "face".
- In August 2006, she became ambassador for Grand Waterfront, a residential development in Hong Kong between Henderson Land Development and its associate the Hong Kong & China Gas Company. Full front page colour photographs of her have appeared as advertisements in several Chinese language newspapers; Minute-long advertisements for the development have been aired on primetime television in Hong Kong with Hawkins as the principal subject.
- In November 2006, Hawkins endorsed a range of Asus laptops in Sydney, Australia, at which the company donated the proceeds of an eBay sale of a special edition pink S6 to the National Breast Cancer Foundation.
- In January 2007, it was announced that Hawkins had signed a deal with Australian Department Store Myer worth $4million (AUD).
- On 9 August 2007, she was offered $50,000 to pose nude in the men's magazine Zoo Magazine, which she declined.
- In 2008, Hawkins approached Myer to develop her own line of swimwear. Eight months later, the brand Cozi is debuted.
- On 6 January 2010, Hawkins appeared naked and unretouched on the February cover of Marie Claire Australia magazine to support the Butterfly Foundation and encourage positive attitudes to body image.
- In 2011, Hawkins signed on to be ambassador for Range Rover and collaborated with the Australia footwear brand Siren, to develop a signature range called JLH for Siren
- In 2012, Foxtel approached Hawkins to become the new host and judge of Australia's Next Top Model. She signed on to take over Sarah Murdoch's position.

== Public image ==
Following her successful public reception, Hawkins initially accepted Bathurst school student Daniel Dibley's invitation to accompany him to his Year 12 graduation ball in August 2006. She later declined, because she did not wish to draw attention away from the other couples. She did however, agree to go with him on a private date.

== Personal life ==
On 4 June 2013, Hawkins married her boyfriend of eight years, Jake Wall, in a small ceremony in a resort on the island of Bali in Indonesia. The couple were engaged for 18 months after Wall proposed in New Zealand. In May 2019, Hawkins announced that she and Wall were expecting their first child together. During her pregnancy, Hawkins discussed her fertility issues while announcing that their daughter was due in October 2019. On 22 October 2019, Hawkins announced that she had given birth to a daughter. Hawkins resides in Sydney. On 20 October 2021, Hawkins announced the birth of their second child, a son.

Awards and achievements
| Preceded by (Dominican Republic) Amelia Vega | Miss Universe; 2004 | Succeeded by (Canada) Natalie Glebova |
| Preceded by (New South Wales) Ashlea Talbot | Miss Universe Australia; 2004 | Succeeded by (Western Australia) Michelle Guy |
