= East Kowloon Corridor =

Trunk road in Kowloon, Hong Kong

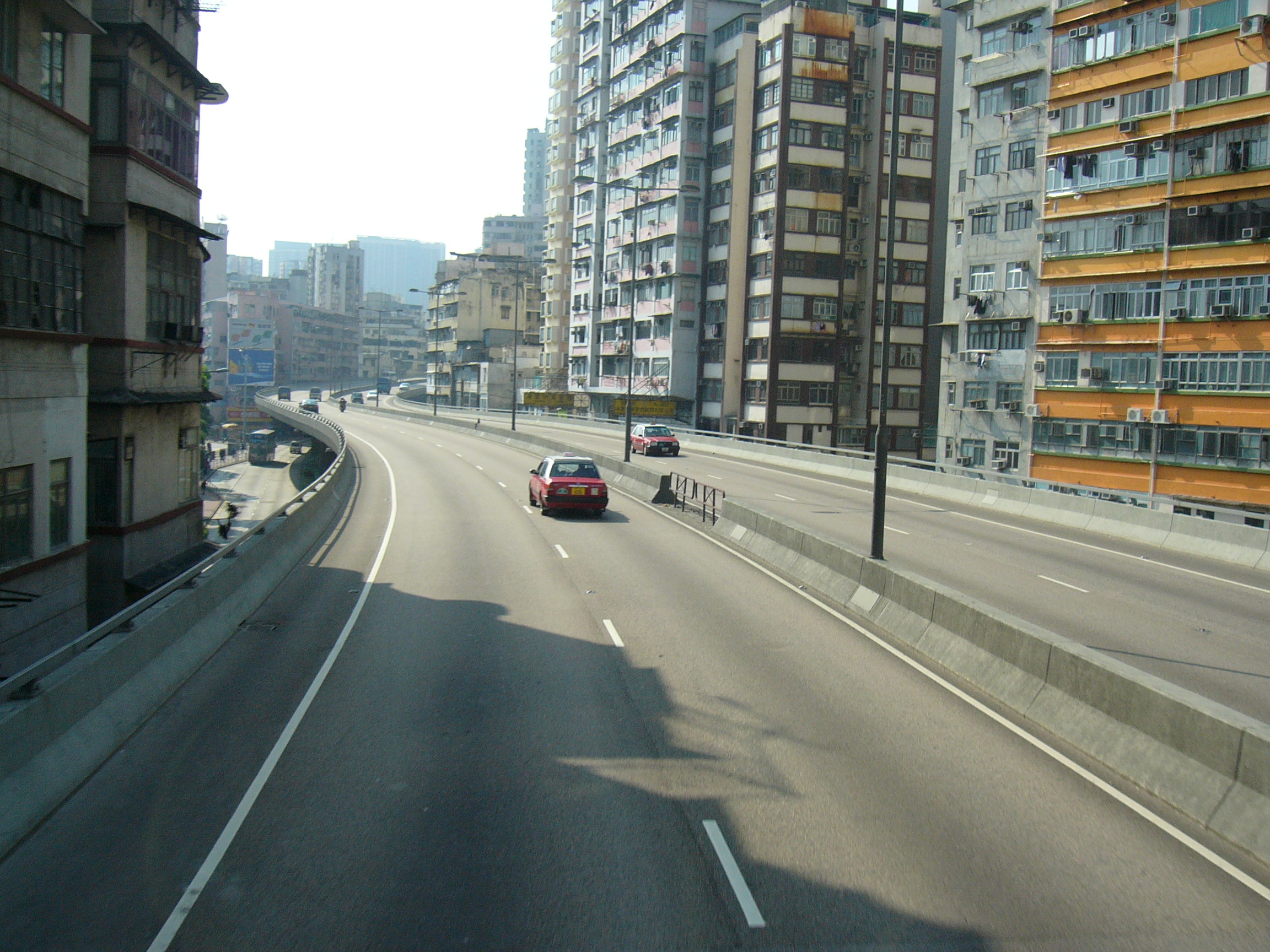
- East Kowloon Corridor near Ko Shan Theatre
- Native name: 東九龍走廊 (Yue Chinese)
- Length: 1.5 kilometres (0.93 mi)
- Location: Kowloon, Hong Kong
- South end: Chatham Road North
- North end: Kai Tak Tunnel

East Kowloon Corridor (Chinese: 東九龍走廊 is a highway in Kowloon, Hong Kong. Part of Route 5, it is a dual two-lane carriageway running from the exit of Kai Tak Tunnel near Sung Wong Toi Road to its ramp on Chatham Road North in Hung Hom, near where Ma Tau Wai Road joins Chatham Road North.

== Description ==
Since its completion in 1981, East Kowloon Corridor, together with Kai Tak Tunnel, play crucial roles in diverting road traffic in Kowloon by feeding traffic between Hung Hom and Kwun Tong by providing a shortcut, thereby avoiding causing traffic congestion in To Kwa Wan, Mong Kok, Kowloon City and Ngau Chi Wan where traffic is already saturated. In particular, East Kowloon Corridor gives drivers an alternative overpass between Hung Hom and Kowloon City. East Kowloon Corridor serves as an ideal alternative for drivers since it has only two exits and no traffic lights.

Geographically, the East Kowloon Corridor runs on top of Kowloon City Road and Ma Tau Wai Road. Just ahead of the entrance to Kai Tak Tunnel lies the only branching exit of East Kowloon Corridor, which goes to Kowloon City Road northbound from the northbound direction, San Shan Road eastbound from the southbound direction, and the only branching entrance to the southbound direction fed from San Shan Road westbound. It descends and joins into Chatham Road North near an intersection with Fat Kwong Street.

The word "East" is used in order to disambiguate from West Kowloon Corridor, which is situated farther west near Lai Chi Kok.

== Effect on surroundings ==
As many buildings were already built around Kowloon City Road and Ma Tau Wai Road before East Kowloon Corridor was constructed, residents in the district, especially those living in lower floors of buildings on the sides of the flyover, were strongly affected by the noise generated from car engines during rush hour. Many residents have already moved out from those buildings and the buildings were turned into commercial or other uses.

Preceded by Kai Tak Tunnel	Hong Kong Route 5 East Kowloon Corridor	Succeeded by Chatham Road North
