= Grand Waterfront =

Housing estate in Ma Tau Kok, Kowloon

Coordinates: 22°19′10″N 114°11′35″E

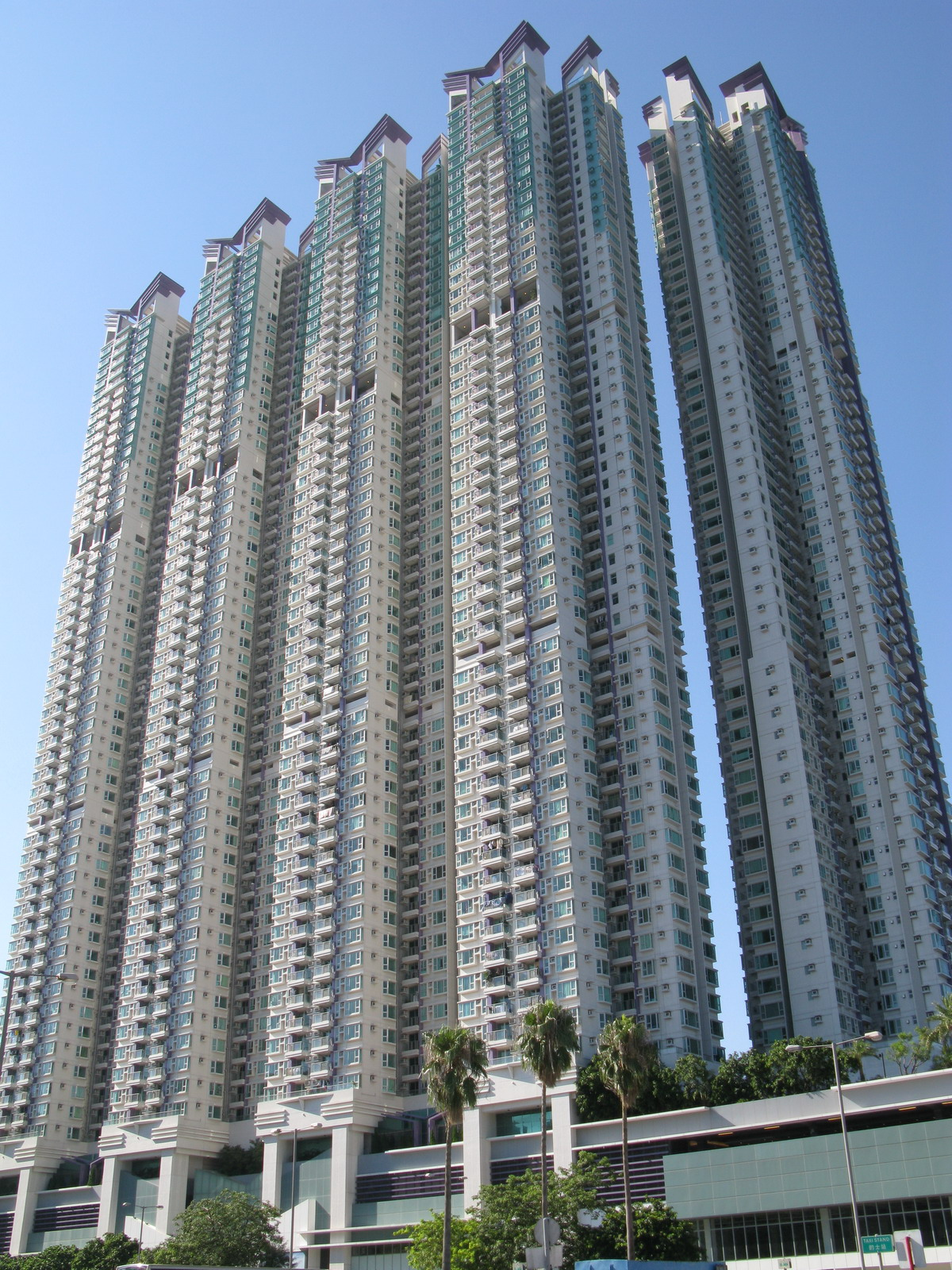
- Grand Waterfront

- Location within Hong Kong

General information
- Status: Completed
- Completed: 2007; 19 years ago

Technical details
- Floor count: 57 (above ground)
- Floor area: 103,100 square metres (1,110,000 sq ft)
- Grounds: 12,126 square metres (130,520 sq ft)

Design and construction
- Architect: DLN Architects
- Developer: Henderson Land; Hong Kong and China Gas Company
- Main contractor: Heng Shung Construction

Other information
- Parking: 268 spaces

Grand Waterfront
- Traditional Chinese: 翔龍灣
- Simplified Chinese: 翔龙湾
Transcriptions
Standard Mandarin
- Hanyu Pinyin: Xiáng Lóng Wān
Yue: Cantonese
- Jyutping: coeng4 lung4 waan1

Grand Waterfront (Chinese: 翔龍灣) is a private housing estate and a shopping mall in Ma Tau Kok, Kowloon, Hong Kong, near Kowloon City Ferry Pier. Formerly a Hong Kong and China Gas towngas plant, the estate consists of five 57-storey high-rise buildings and a shopping arcade. It was jointly developed by Henderson Land Development and Hong Kong and China Towngas and completed in 2007.

== History ==
The site was formerly the southern plant of the Ma Tau Kok towngas factory, owned by Hong Kong and China Gas. It was shut down in the 1990s. Height restrictions across Kowloon were relaxed following the 1998 closure of nearby Kai Tak Airport. Henderson Land, which owns part of the Hong Kong and China Gas Company, applied to the Town Planning Board to allow for high-rise residential development on the site.

The complex was designed by DLN Architects of Hong Kong. The main contractor was Heng Shung Construction, a subsidiary of Henderson Land.

As part of the launch of the project, in August 2006, Jennifer Hawkins became the ambassador for the development. Full front page colour photographs of her appeared as advertisements in several Chinese-language newspapers; minute-long advertisements for the development were aired on primetime television in Hong Kong featuring Hawkins.

== Characteristics and features ==
Grand Waterfront has a total gross floor area of approximately 103,100 square metres (1,110,000 sq ft) occupying a site of 12,126 square metres (130,520 sq ft). It has five residential blocks housing 1,782 units, a shopping centre, and a 268-space car park.

The residential blocks have 52 storeys (51 with residential flats, plus the lobby level). As some floor numbers are omitted for superstitious reasons, the topmost floors are labelled as the 62nd storey.

The two-level shopping centre, called Grand Waterfront Plaza, has a floor area of approximately 150,000 square feet (14,000 m^{2}). It has approximately 50 shops. The largest anchors are Wellcome Superstore and Victoria Harbour Restaurant.

== Transport ==
The estate is adjacent to Kowloon City Ferry Pier and the Kowloon City Ferry Pier Bus Terminus.

Grand Waterfront is approximately 0.9 km from the Exit A of To Kwa Wan MTR station. It takes around 10-min walk to the station.

== Education ==
Grand Waterfront is in Primary One Admission (POA) School Net 34. Within the school net are multiple aided schools (operated independently but funded with government money) and two government schools: Farm Road Government Primary School and Ma Tau Chung Government Primary School.
