= To Kwa Wan =

Area of Kowloon, Hong Kong

Coordinates: 22.31885°N 114.19070°E

To Kwa Wan 土瓜灣
- Neighborhood
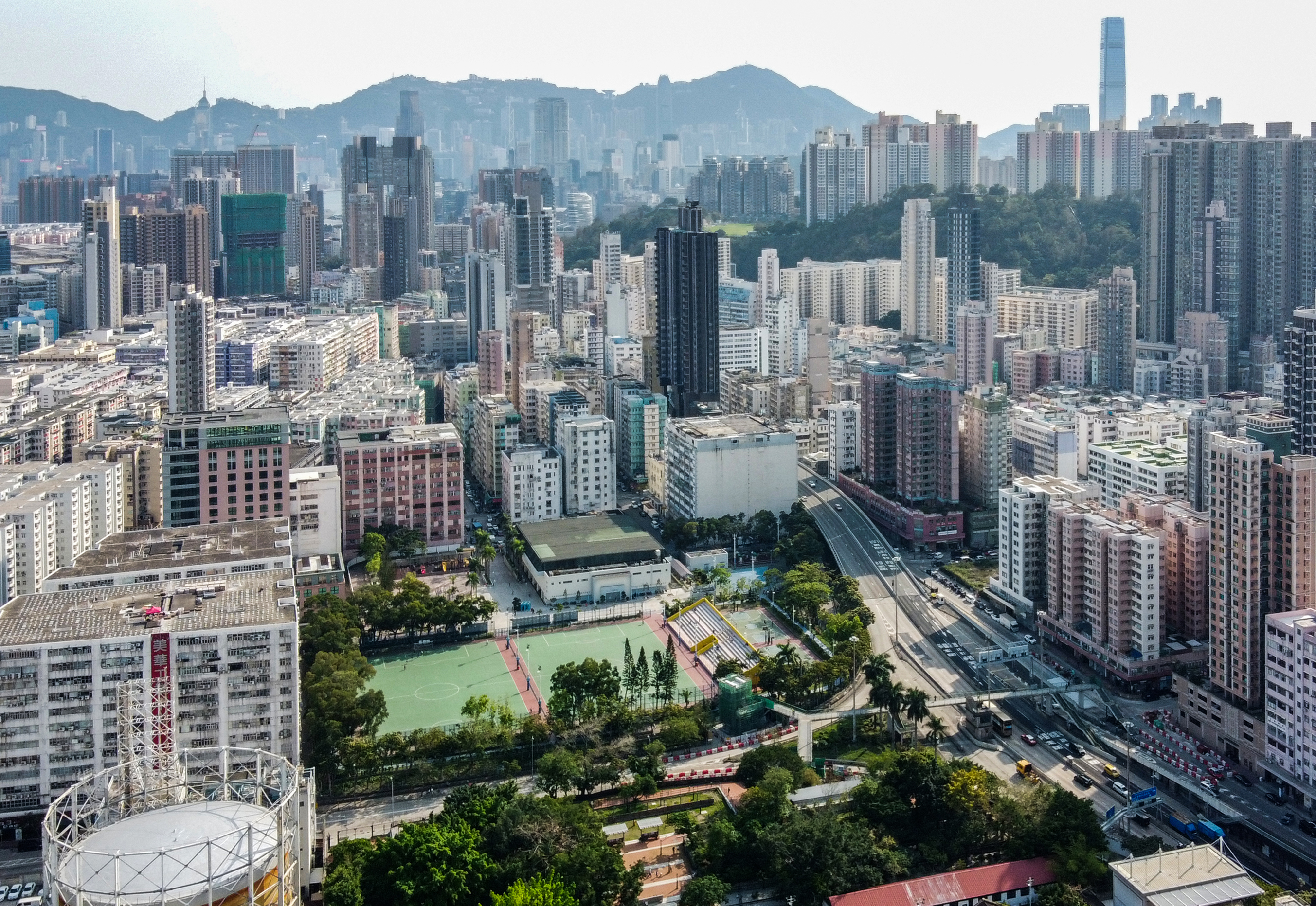
- Country: China
- SAR: Hong Kong
- Region: Kowloon
- District: Kowloon City

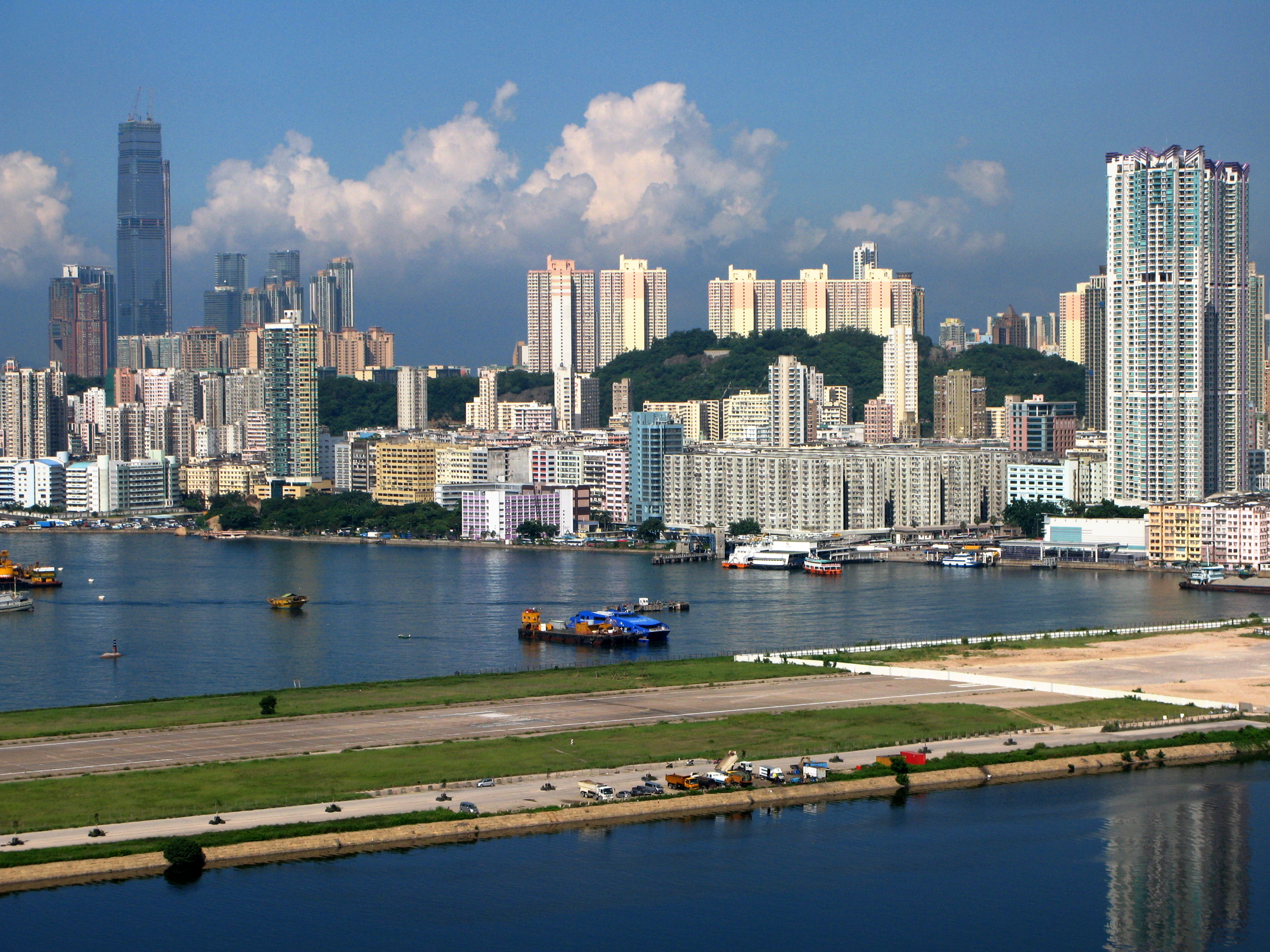
Looking at To Kwa Wan and the old Kai Tak runway from the east side of Kowloon Bay

To Kwa Wan
- Traditional Chinese: 土瓜灣
- Simplified Chinese: 土瓜湾
Transcriptions
Standard Mandarin
- Hanyu Pinyin: Tǔ Guā Wān
Yue: Cantonese
- Yale Romanization: Tóugwāwàahn
- Jyutping: tou2 gwaa1 waan4

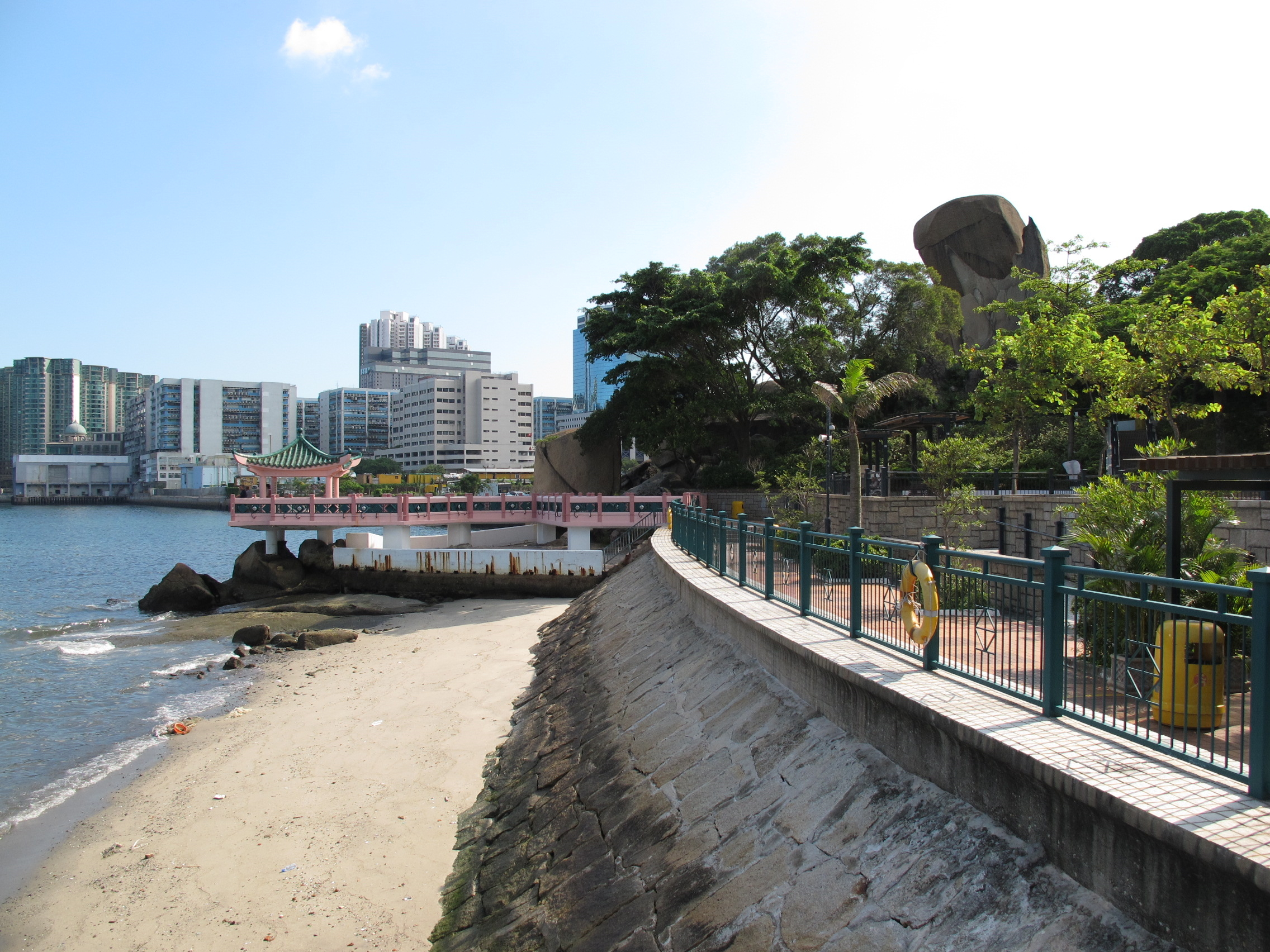
Hoi Sham Park

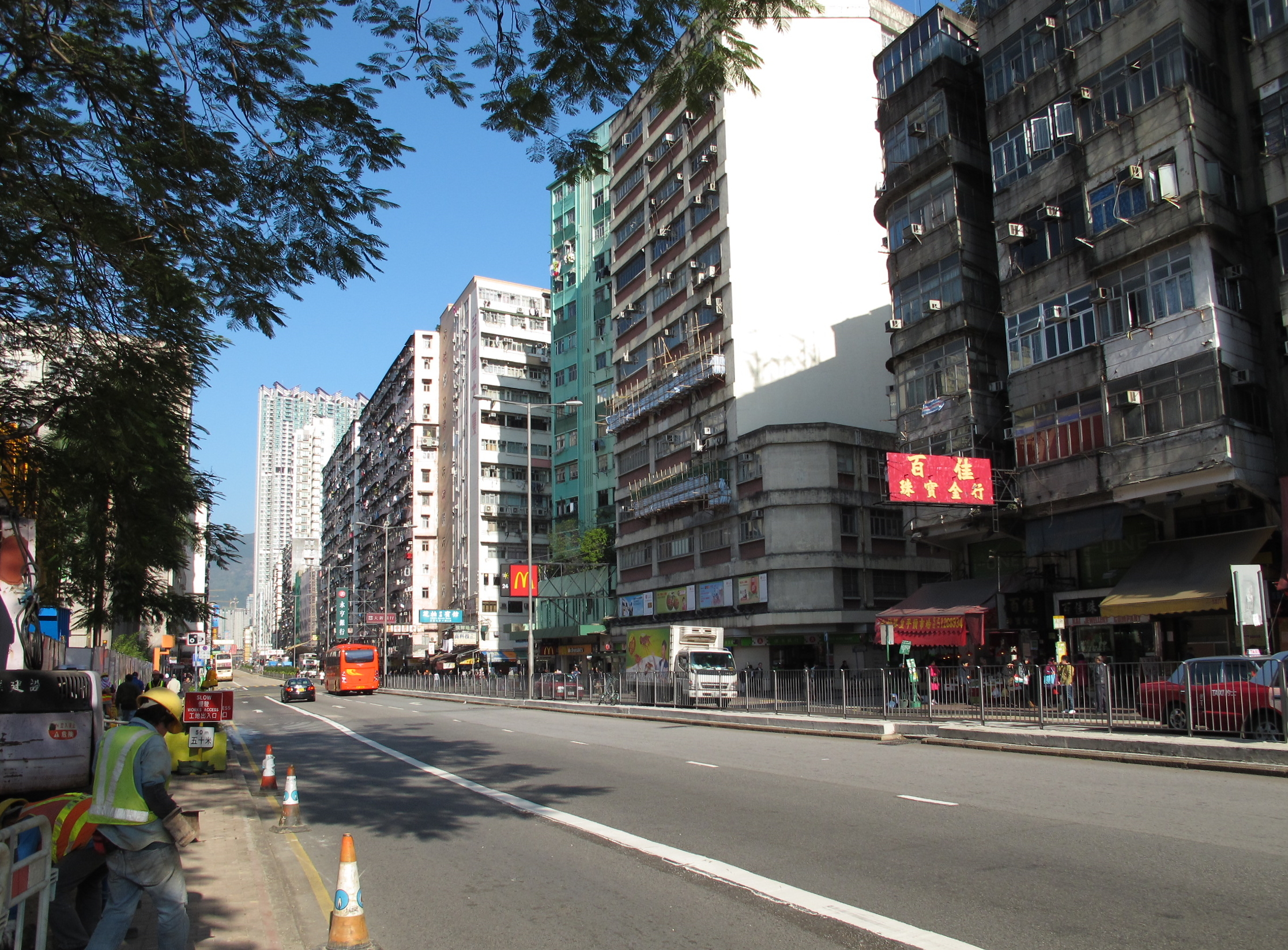
Buildings along To Kwa Wan Road

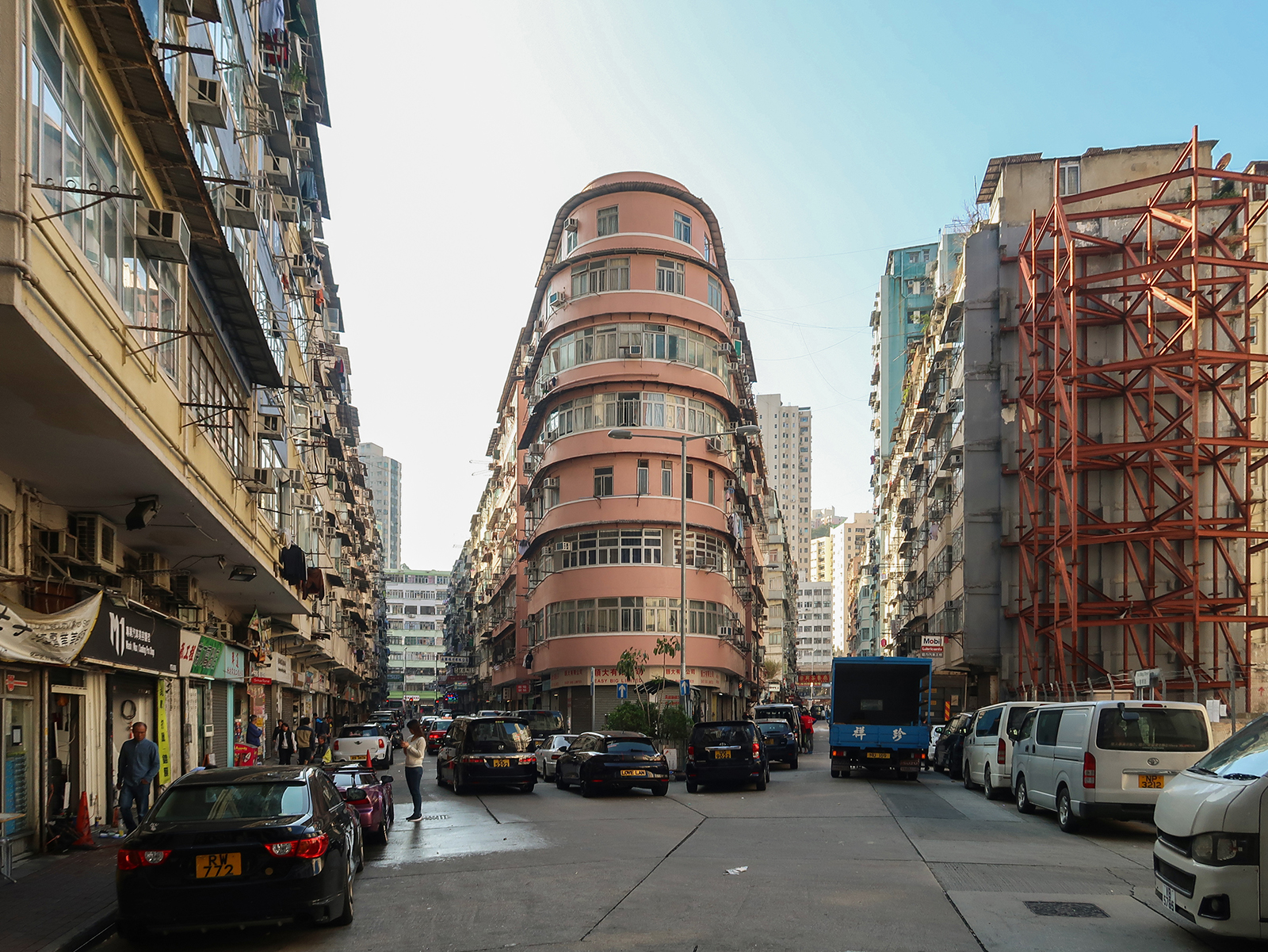
Eiver House

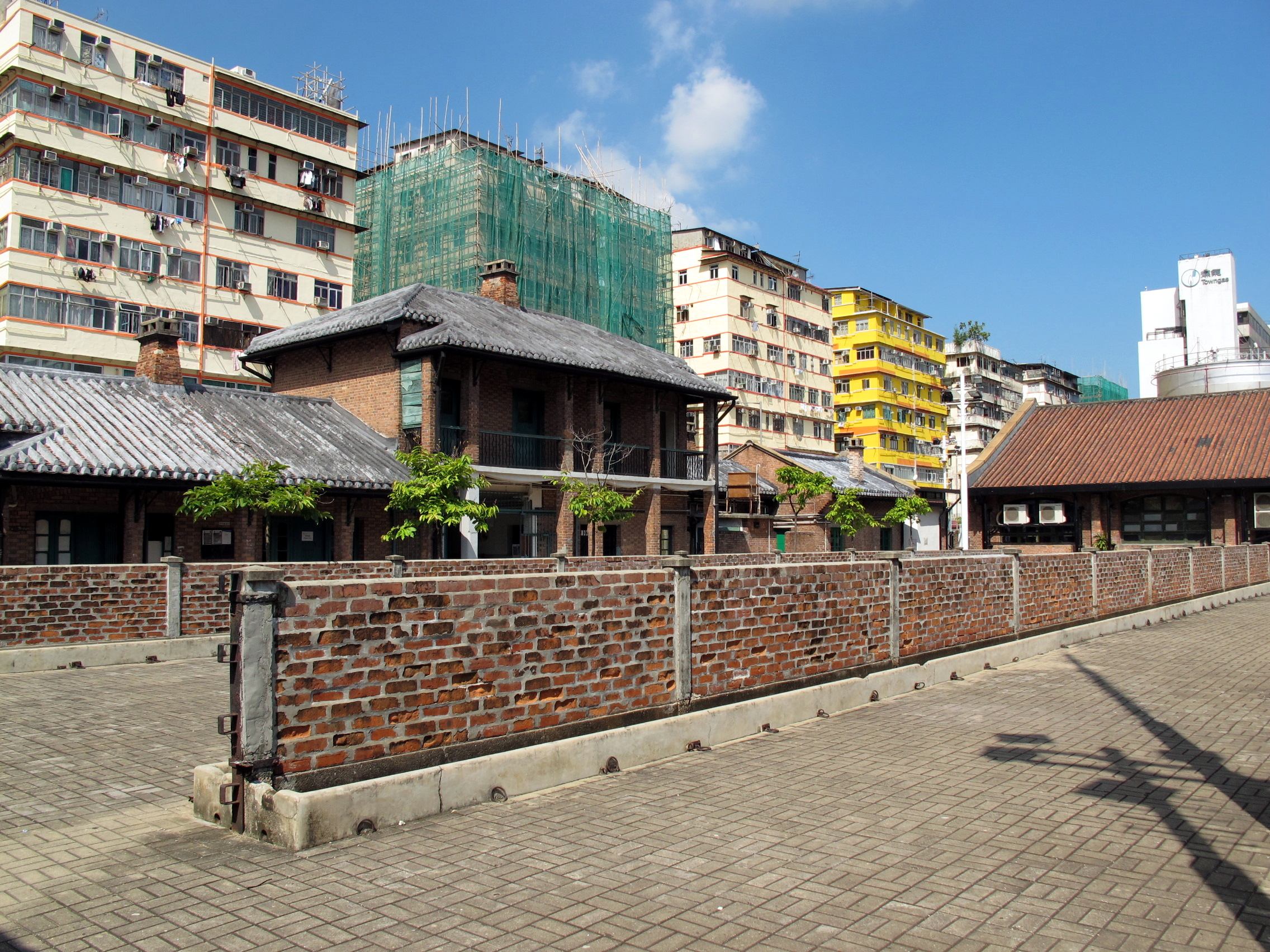
13 Streets Buildings near Cattle Depot Artist Village

To Kwa Wan (Chinese: 土瓜灣; Cantonese Yale: Tóugwāwàahn) is a bay and an area of the eastern shore of Kowloon peninsula. The area is part of urban Hong Kong, and is situated between Hok Yuen, Hung Hom, Ma Tau Chung and Ma Tau Kok. Administratively, the area belongs to the Kowloon City District of Kowloon.

To Kwa Wan is a mixed residential and commercial area, located to the west of the old Kai Tak Airport.

It comprises mostly mid-20th century residential and light industrial architecture of 10 or fewer floors, built to comply with height restrictions for the former Kai Tak Airport. Since the airport closed in 1998, new buildings are taller, often with commercial space on the ground floor, especially along major roads such a Ma Tau Wai Road. Consequently, the area has a much-valued cohesive community spirit.

To Kwa Wan station services this area.

== History ==
The name "To Kwa Wan" literally means "Potato Bay", named for the sweet potatoes formerly grown here by local Hakka people. From the 19th century, a nearby granite quarry provided construction materials, including for the development of Kai Tak Airport.

At the time of the 1911 census, the population of To Kwa Wan was 1,072. The number of males was 766.

After World War II, light industrial units sprang up, making products such as toys and textiles. Housing rose concurrently with factory buildings, and in the 1970s the area's public housing estates were built to relieve pressure in other crowded areas of Kowloon.

Poor building standards and ageing have been highlighted by crumbling facades that have hurt or killed people in the area. The demolition of older flats has allowed developers to acquire land in To Kwa Wan to build newer and more profitable residential flats.

== Green space ==
Alongside high-density residential and commercial zoning, there are a few green spaces in To Kwa Wan:

- Hoi Sham Park – a park facing Kowloon Bay
- To Kwa Wan Recreation Ground

With extensive land reclamation in the early 1970s, Hoi Sham Island, formerly located in the adjacent bay, was incorporated into the peninsula, becoming part of the Hoi Sham Park.

== Transportation ==
There only a few main roads in the area. All other roads are side streets serving local residents. To Kwa Wan Road and Ma Tau Wai Road form a V-shaped corridor, while the East Kowloon Corridor is an elevated highway passing through the middle of To Kwa Wan.

The Kowloon City Pier Bus Terminus to the north services several local bus routes.

To Kwa Wan station now serves the area with the full opening of the Tuen Ma Line as part of new Sha Tin to Central Link, in anticipation of which new development is already taking place.

== Education ==
To Kwa Wan is in Primary One Admission (POA) School Net 34. Within the school net are multiple aided schools (operated independently but funded with government money) and two government schools: Farm Road Government Primary School and Ma Tau Chung Government Primary School.

Hong Kong Public Libraries maintains the To Kwa Wan Public Library in the To Kwa Wan Market & Government Offices complex.

== See also ==
- Hoi Sham Island
- Kowloon Bay
- Grand Waterfront
- Celestial Heights
- Cattle Depot Artist Village
- 13 Streets
