= Ma Tau Kok =

Industrial Residential

Coordinates: 22.32061°N 114.19290°E

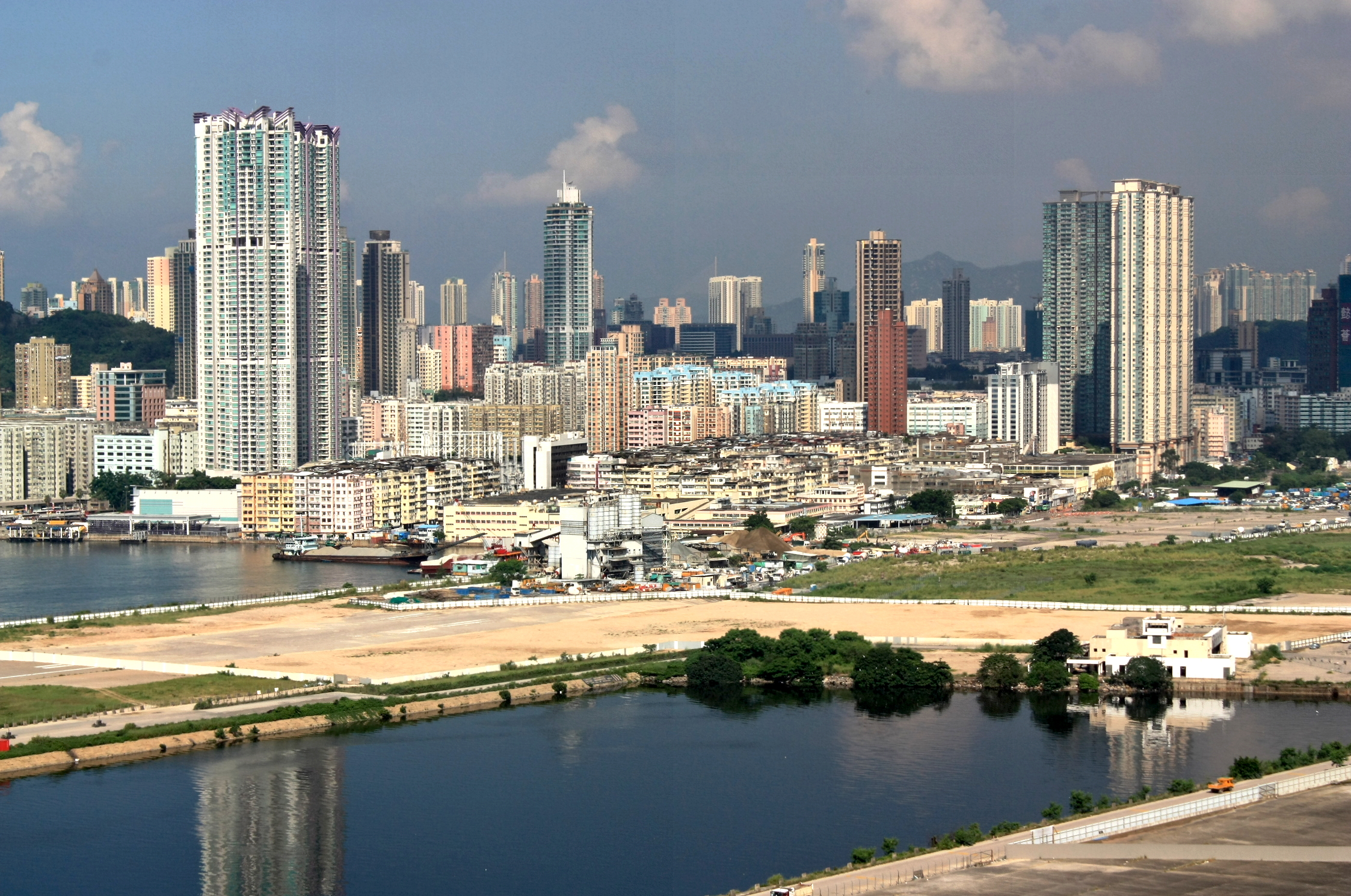
Ma Tau Kok (foreground) and Ma Tau Chung (background)

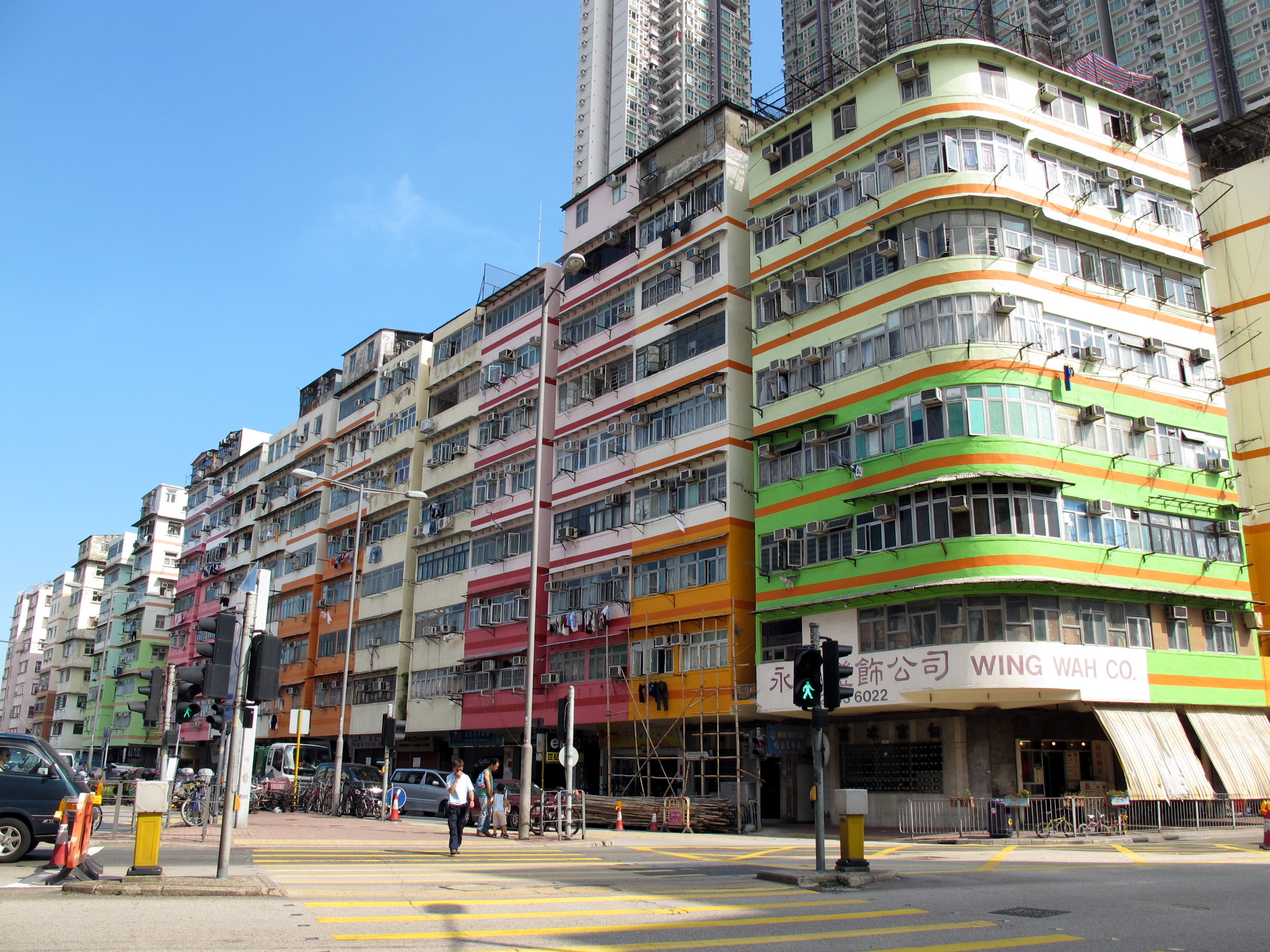
Ma Tau Kok Road Old apartments

Ma Tau Kok (Chinese: 馬頭角) is a place north of To Kwa Wan, south-east of modern-day Ma Tau Chung and south-west of the former Kai Tak Airport (now Kai Tak Development) in Hong Kong. It was a cape in Kowloon Bay in Victoria Harbour and opposite to the Sacred Hill and the mouth of Ma Tau Chung. (Note: The river stream (chung in Cantonese) does not exist in modern day. The name of its namesake area is not used in modern-day maps. Ma Tau Chung Road (the original Kowloon City Road) was named after Ma Tau Chung, but it is not the same area as the stream and the historical area. The stream was eastbound, while the road runs roughly from southwest to northeast.) Ma Tau Kok is a mixed industrial and residential area.

Ma Tau Kok Road is named after Ma Tau Kok.

== History ==
At the time of the 1911 census, the population of Ma Tau Kok was 212. The number of males was 145.

== Industrial history ==
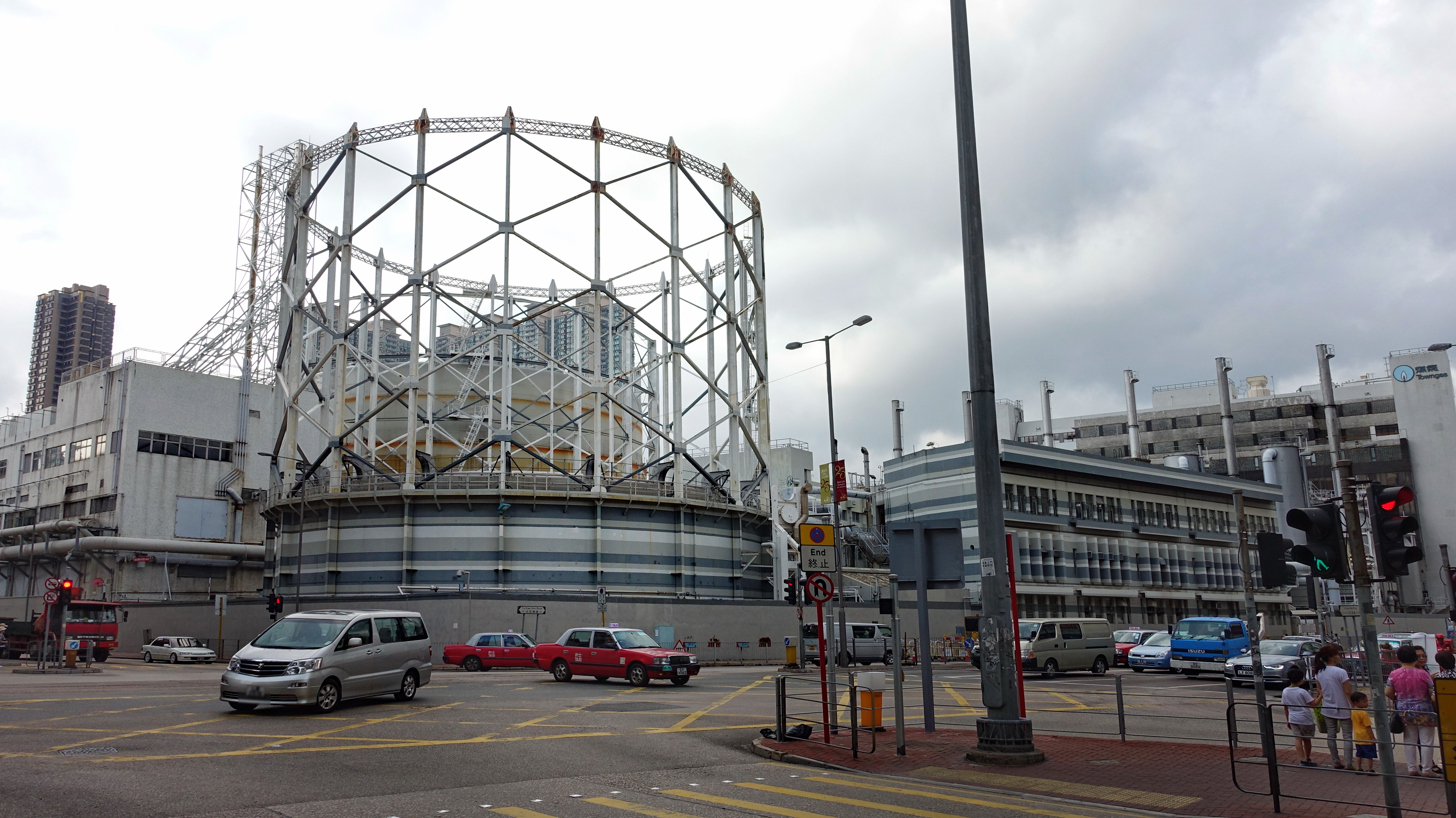
Ma Tau Kok Gas Holder (2015)

In 1935, a gas work was built at the junction of To Kwa Wan and Ma Tau Kok roads. It was operational until about 1994. Today, Grand Waterfront building stands there.

In 1956, a second gas work was built west of To Kwa Wan Road. Later it switched from coal to naphtha gasification. Today, it is a storage facility with a small gasification plant as a backup.

== Cattle Depot Artist Village ==
A former cattle depot and slaughterhouse has been turned into the Cattle Depot Artist Village. It contains artist studios and hosts exhibitions and art projects.

== Transport ==
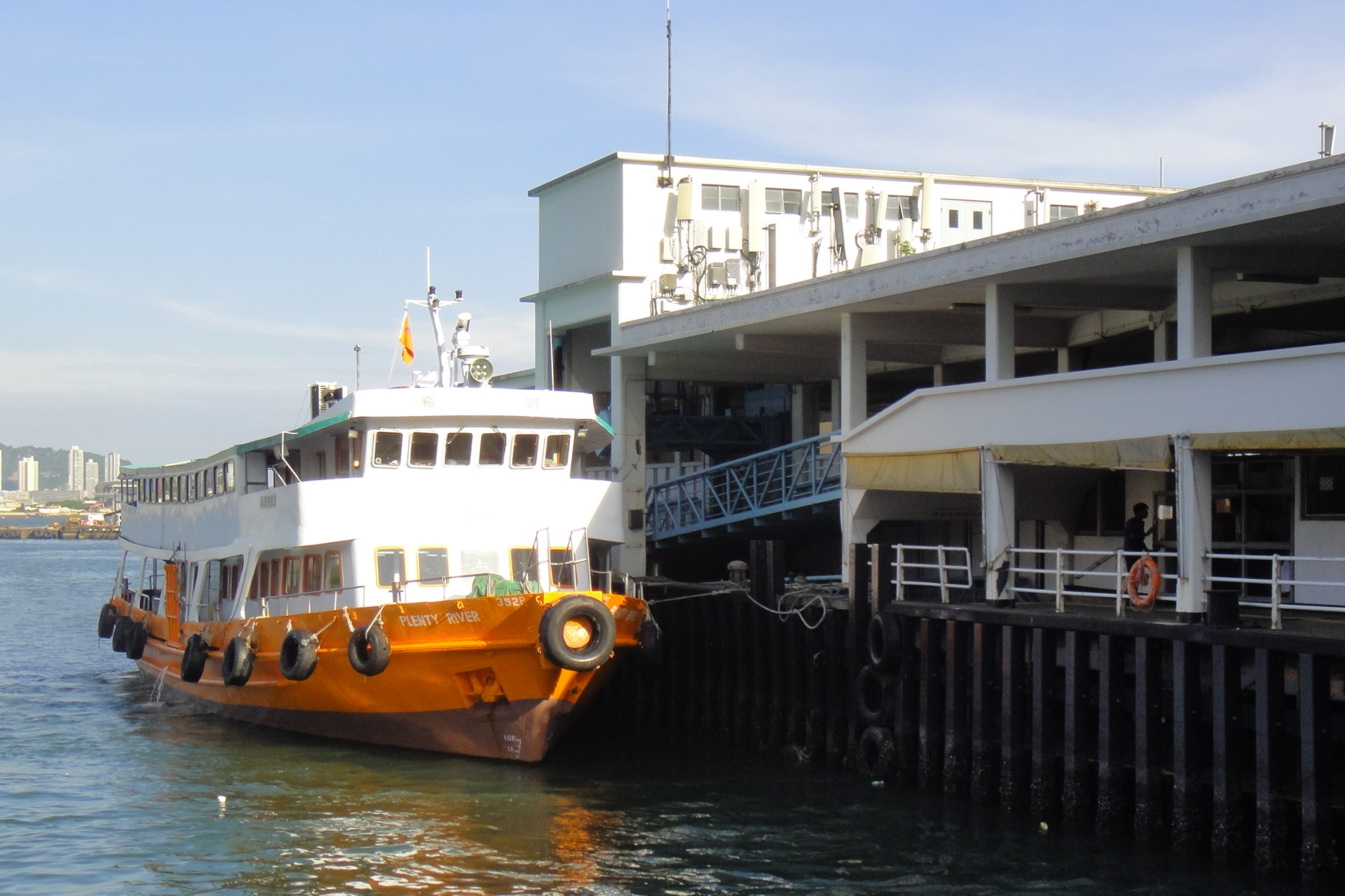
Kowloon City Ferry Pier with "Plenty River" operated by New World First Ferry

The Kowloon City Ferry Pier and the Ma Tau Kok Public Pier are in Ma Tau Kok. From here, a regular ferry service (every 30 minutes during the day) operated by Sun Ferry goes to North Point. A bus terminus is located next to the piers.

Ma Tau Kok Road runs in a west-northwest-east-southeast direction, connecting Ma Tau Chung and Ma Tau Kok.

== Education ==
Ma Tau Kok is in Primary One Admission (POA) School Net 34. Within the school net are multiple aided schools (operated independently but funded with government money) and two government schools: Farm Road Government Primary School and Ma Tau Chung Government Primary School.

== See also ==
- 13 Streets
