= Sung Wong Toi (constituency) =

- Elected constituency for the Kowloon City District Council
- Boundary of Sung Wong Toi in Kowloon City District
- District: Kowloon City
- Legislative Council constituency: Kowloon Central
- Population: 20,388 (2019)
- Electorate: 7,383 (2019)

Current constituency
- Created: 2015
- Number of members: One
- Member: Yeung Chun-yu (ADPL)
- Created from: Kai Tak

Sung Wong Toi (Chinese: 宋皇臺) is one of the 25 electoral constituencies in the Kowloon City District of Hong Kong which was created in 2015.

The constituency has an estimated population of 20,388 as of 2015.

It is named after Sung Wong Toi. However, as of 2019, the public garden that the rock of Sung Wong Toi was physically located, belongs to Ma Tau Wai constituency, while Sung Wong Toi is the constituency that bordering Ma Tau Wai constituency.

Sung Wong Toi constituency covers part of the Ma Tau Kok, the rest are covered by Ma Hang Chung and Ma Tau Kok constituencies.

== Councillors represented ==
Election	Member	Party
2015	Yeung Chun-yu	ADPL
2017	Yeung Chun-yu	Independent democrat

== Election results ==
=== 2010s ===
Kowloon City District Council Election, 2019: Sung Wong Toi
Party	Candidate	Votes	%	±%
Ind. democrat	Ronald Yeung Chun-yu	3,406	67.59	
FTU	Wu Ming-tai	1,315	26.10	
Nonpartisan	Alexander Ip Chi-wai	318	6.31	
Majority		2,091	41.49	
Turnout		5,049	68.42	
Ind. democrat hold		Swing		

Kowloon City District Council Election, 2015: Sung Wong Toi
Party	Candidate	Votes	%	±%
ADPL	Ronald Yeung Chun-yu	2,015	62.8	
FTU	Gary Cheng Chun-wah	694	21.6	
Nonpartisan	Alexander Ip Chi-wai	502	15.6	
Majority		1,321	41.2	
Turnout		3,243	44.4	
ADPL win (new seat)				
