= Kai Tak East (constituency) =

- 啟德東
- Elected constituency for the Kowloon City District Council
- Boundary of Kai Tak East in Kowloon City District
- District: Kowloon City
- Legislative Council constituency: Kowloon Central
- Population: 12,993 (2019)
- Electorate: 6,373 (2019)

Current constituency
- Created: 2019
- Number of members: One
- Member: He Huahan (BPA)
- Created from: Kai Tak North, Kai Tak South

Kai Tak East (Chinese: 啟德東) is one of the 25 constituencies in the Kowloon City District.

Created for the 2019 District Council elections, the constituency returns one district councillor to the Kowloon City District Council, with an election every four years.

Kai Tak East loosely covers part of the public housing estate Tak Long Estate in the previously Kai Tak Airport. It has projected population of 12,993.

== Councillors represented ==
| Election | Member | Party |
|---|---|---|
| 2019 | He Huahan | BPA |

== Election results ==
=== 2010s ===
Kowloon City District Council Election, 2019: Kai Tak East
| Party | Candidate | Votes | % | ±% |
|---|---|---|---|---|
| BPA | He Huahan | 2,638 | 58.98 | |
| Nonpartisan | Tony Wong Yip-tung | 1,835 | 41.02 | |
| Majority | | 803 | 17.96 | |
| Turnout | | 4,495 | 70.54 | |
| BPA win (new seat) | | | | |
