= Sheung Lok (constituency) =

Hong Kong constituency

Sheung Lok 常樂
- Elected constituency for the Kowloon City District Council
- Boundary of Sheung Lok 常樂 in Kowloon City District
- District: Kowloon City
- Legislative Council constituency: Kowloon Central
- Population: 20,454 (2019)
- Electorate: 11,067 (2019)

Current constituency
- Created: 1994
- Number of members: One
- Member: Vacant
- Created from: Ho Man Tin; Chun Kuk

Sheung Lok (常樂) is one of the 22 constituencies in the Kowloon City District in Hong Kong. The constituency returns one district councillor to the Kowloon City District Council, with an election every four years.

Sheung Lok constituency is loosely based on the area around Ho Man Tin Estate and Sheung Lok Estate in Homantin with an estimated population of 20,454.

== Councillors represented ==
Election	Member	Party
1994	Wong Siu-yee	LDF
1997	Wong Siu-yee	Progressive Alliance
2003	Tsoi Lai-ling	CTU
2007	Luk King-kwong	DAB/FTU
2019	Wong Wing-kit→Vacant (Note: Resigned on 10 July 2021.)	Democratic

== Election results ==
=== 2010s ===
Kowloon City District Council Election, 2019: Sheung Lok
Party	Candidate	Votes	%	±%
Democratic	Wong Wing-kit	4,583	57.63	+13.73
DAB	Luk King-kwong	3,250	40.87	−11.33
Nonpartisan	Ng Ka-fai	119	1.50	
Majority		1,333	16.76	
Turnout		7,958	71.95	
Democratic gain from DAB		Swing		

Kowloon City District Council Election, 2015: Sheung Lok
Party	Candidate	Votes	%	±%
DAB	Luk King-kwong	2,776	52.21	–15.13
ADPL	Wong Wing-kit	2,332	43.86	+11.20
Nonpartisan	Judy Chan Ka-ling	209	3.93	
Majority		444	8.35	
Turnout		2,517	41.3	
DAB hold		Swing	–13.2	

Kowloon City District Council Election, 2011: Sheung Lok
Party	Candidate	Votes	%	±%
DAB	Luk King-kwong	2,820	67.34	+13.37
ADPL	Wong Wing-kit	1,368	32.66	
DAB hold		Swing	+12.4	

=== 2000s ===
Kowloon City District Council Election, 2007: Sheung Lok
Party	Candidate	Votes	%	±%
DAB (FTU)	Luk King-kwong	2,666	53.97	
Independent	Tsoi Lai-ling	2,200	44.53	−9.67
Independent	Chan Yin-ling	74	1.50	
DAB hold		Swing	+9.0	

Kowloon City District Council Election, 2003: Sheung Lok
Party	Candidate	Votes	%	±%
CTU	Tsoi Lai-ling	2,524	54.20	+12.18
HKPA	Wong Siu-yee	2,133	45.80	−12.18
CTU gain from HKPA		Swing	+12.2	

=== 1990s ===
Kowloon City District Council Election, 1999: Sheung Lok
Party	Candidate	Votes	%	±%
HKPA	Wong Siu-yee	1,799	57.98	−4.33
Democratic	Tsoi Lai-ling	1,304	42.02	
HKPA hold		Swing		

Kowloon City District Board Election, 1994: Sheung Lok
Party	Candidate	Votes	%	±%
LDF	Wong Siu-yee	1,696	63.31	
Kowloon City Observers	Yung Ching-tat	983	36.69	
LDF win (new seat)				
