= Ma Hang Chung (constituency) =

Hong Kong constituency

- Elected constituency for the Kowloon City District Council
- Boundary of Ma Hang Chung in Kowloon City District
- District: Kowloon City
- Legislative Council constituency: Kowloon Central
- Population: 20,388 (2019)
- Electorate: 8,894 (2019)

Current constituency
- Created: 1994
- Number of members: One
- Member: Lai Kwong-wai (Democratic)
- Created from: Kai Tak; Ma Tau Kok

Ma Hang Chung (Chinese: 馬坑涌) is one of the 25 constituencies in the Kowloon City District of Hong Kong which was created in 1994.

The constituency loosely covers Jubilant Place and Grand Waterfront in Ma Tau Kok with the estimated population of 20,388.

== Councillors represented ==
Election	Member	Party
1994	Wen Choy-bon	DAB/FTU
2011	Wong Yun-cheong	DAB
2012	Wong Yun-cheong	FTU
2015	Kenny Lai Kwong-wai	ADPL
2017	Kenny Lai Kwong-wai	Democratic

== Election results ==
=== 2010s ===
Kowloon City District Council Election, 2019: Ma Hang Chung
Party	Candidate	Votes	%	±%
Democratic	Kenny Lai Kwong-wai	3,966	61.14	+12.64
FTU (DAB)	Tang Hou-tong	2,437	37.57	−9.63
Ind. democrat	Chan Hiu-wai	84	1.29	
Majority		1,529	23.57	
Turnout		6,496	73.04	
Democratic hold		Swing		

Kowloon City District Council Election, 2015: Ma Hang Chung
Party	Candidate	Votes	%	±%
ADPL	Kenny Lai Kwong-wai	1,663	48.5	+5.5
FTU	Wong Yun-cheong	1,618	47.2	−5.5
Nonpartisan	Lau Shu-yin	148	4.3	
Majority		45	1.3	
Turnout		3,429	44.4	
ADPL gain from FTU		Swing	+5.5	

Kowloon City District Council Election, 2011: Ma Hang Chung
Party	Candidate	Votes	%	±%
DAB	Wong Yun-cheong	1,416	52.7	−2.0
ADPL	Yu Chun-yin	1,156	43.0	
Nonpartisan	Yau Lau-chun	114	4.2	
Majority		260	9.7	
Turnout		2,686	37.6	
DAB hold		Swing		

=== 2000s ===
Kowloon City District Council Election, 2007: Ma Hang Chung
Party	Candidate	Votes	%	±%
FTU (DAB)	Wen Choy-bon	1,512	54.7	−2.0
ADPL	Yeung Chun-yu	1,101	39.8	
Liberal	Suen Tsan-pui	151	5.5	
Majority		411	14.9	
FTU hold		Swing		

Kowloon City District Council Election, 2003: Ma Hang Chung
Party	Candidate	Votes	%	±%
DAB	Wen Choy-bon	1,265	56.7	−14.2
Nonpartisan	Tse Pak-lok	965	43.3	
Majority		300	13.4	
DAB hold		Swing		

=== 1990s ===
Kowloon City District Council Election, 1999: Ma Hang Chung
Party	Candidate	Votes	%	±%
DAB	Wen Choy-bon	1,175	70.9	+11.9
DPHK	Poon Chi-man	482	29.1	−11.9
Majority		693	41.8	
DAB hold		Swing		

Kowloon City District Board Election, 1994: Ma Hang Chung
Party	Candidate	Votes	%	±%
DAB	Wen Choy-bon	1,053	59.0	
DPHK	Chan Chi-keung	733	41.0	
Majority		320	18.0	
DAB win (new seat)				
