= Kadoorie (constituency) =

Hong Kong constituency

- Elected constituency for the Kowloon City District Council
- Boundary of Kadoorie in Kowloon City District
- District: Kowloon City
- Legislative Council constituency: Kowloon Central
- Population: 19,100 (2019)
- Electorate: 8,696 (2019)

Current constituency
- Created: 1994
- Number of members: One
- Member: Vacant
- Created from: Ho Man Tin

Kadoorie (Chinese: 嘉道理) is one of the 25 constituencies in the Kowloon City District of Hong Kong which was created in 1994.

The constituency loosely covers Kadoorie Hill with the estimated population of 19,100.

== Councillors represented ==
Election	Member	Party
1994	Chan King-wong	Independent
2011	Siu Leong-sing→Vacant (Note: Resigned on 8 September 2021.)	ADPL
2017	Siu Leong-sing→Vacant	Democratic

== Election results ==
=== 2010s ===
Kowloon City District Council Election, 2019: Kadoorie
Party	Candidate	Votes	%	±%
Democratic	Siu Leong-sing	3,929	63.52	+15.02
Nonpartisan	Wong Man-kong	2,256	36.48	
Majority		1,673	27.04	
Turnout		6,220	71.54	
Democratic hold		Swing		

Kowloon City District Council Election, 2015: Kadoorie
Party	Candidate	Votes	%	±%
ADPL	Siu Leong-sing	2,378	48.5	−0.1
Independent	Jack Wong Chi	1,333	35.1	
Independent	Lau Hok-wai	92	2.4	
Majority		1,045	13.4	
Turnout		3,803	47.7	
ADPL hold		Swing		

Kowloon City District Council Election, 2011: Kadoorie
Party	Candidate	Votes	%	±%
ADPL	Siu Leong-sing	1,632	48.6	+2.9
Independent	Chan King-wong	1,583	47.2	−7.1
People Power	Tsang Wai-hin	140	4.2	
Majority		49	1.4	
Turnout		3,355	42.3	
ADPL gain from Nonpartisan		Swing	+5.0	

=== 2000s ===
Kowloon City District Council Election, 2007: Kadoorie
Party	Candidate	Votes	%	±%
Independent	Chan King-wong	1,174	54.3	−12.2
ADPL	Siu Leong-sing	990	45.7	
Majority		184	8.6	
Nonpartisan hold		Swing		

Kowloon City District Council Election, 2003: Kadoorie
Party	Candidate	Votes	%	±%
Independent	Chan King-wong	1,552	66.5	+17.1
Liberal	Kam Yiu-ming	781	33.5	
Majority		771	33.0	
Nonpartisan hold		Swing		

=== 1990s ===
Kowloon City District Council Election, 1999: Kadoorie
Party	Candidate	Votes	%	±%
Independent	Chan King-wong	956	49.4	+13.9
Democratic	Chan Kin-shing	809	41.8	
Nonpartisan	Yan Wai-kin	171	8.8	
Majority		147	7.6	
Nonpartisan hold		Swing		

Kowloon City District Board Election, 1994: Kadoorie
Party	Candidate	Votes	%	±%
Independent	Chan King-wong	696	35.5	
KCO	Ng Kwok-chun	577	29.4	
Independent	Mak Hon-kai	526	27.3	
PAS	Chiang Kit-fung	154	7.8	
Majority		119	6.1	
Nonpartisan win (new seat)				
