= Lok Man (constituency) =

- 樂民
- Elected constituency for the Kowloon City District Council
- Boundary of Lok Man in Kowloon City District
- District: Kowloon City
- Legislative Council constituency: Kowloon Central
- Population: 15,428 (2019)
- Electorate: 8,544 (2019)

Current constituency
- Created: 1991
- Number of members: One
- Member: Yang Wing-kit (Independent)

Lok Man (Chinese: 樂民) is one of the 25 constituencies in the Kowloon City District of Hong Kong which was created in 1991.

The constituency has an estimated population of 15,428.

== Councillors represented ==
Election	Member	Party
1991	Tang Po-hong	LDF
1997	Tang Po-hong	Progressive Alliance
2003	Au Ka-shing	Democratic
2007	Yang Wing-kit	Independent

== Election results ==
=== 2010s ===
Kowloon City District Council Election, 2019: Lok Man
Party	Candidate	Votes	%	±%
Independent	Yang Wing-kit	3,312	55.14	
Democratic Coalition	Vincent Lam	2,694	44.86	
Majority		618	10.28	
Turnout		6,036	70.69	
Independent hold		Swing		
