= 2004 Hong Kong legislative election in Kowloon West =

- 12 September 2004

All 4 Kowloon West seats to the Legislative Council
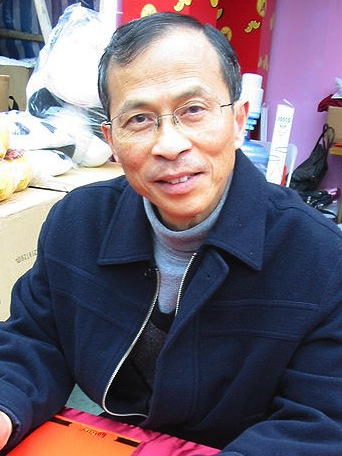

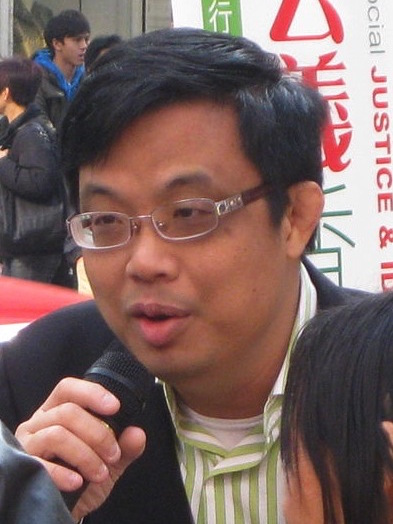

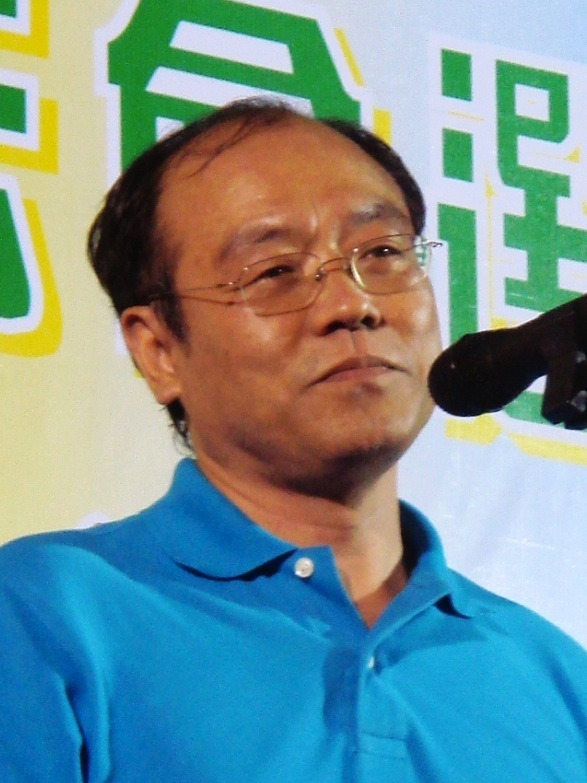

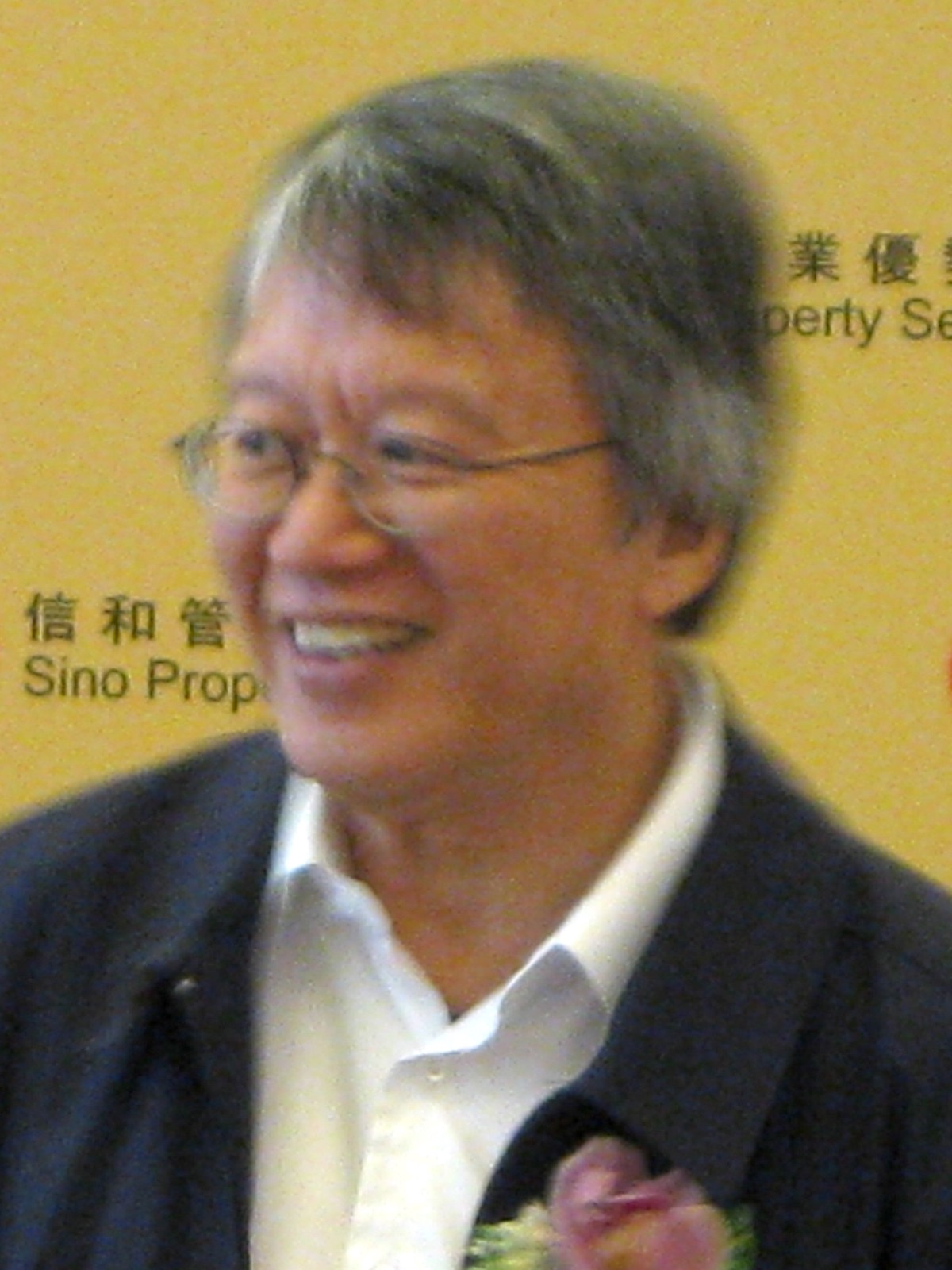
	First party	Second party
Leader	Jasper Tsang	James To
Party	DAB	Democratic
Alliance	Pro-Beijing	Pro-democracy
Last election	1 seat, 23.5%	1 seat, 41.3%
Seats before	1	1
Seats won	1	1
Seat change	Steady	Steady
Popular vote	61,770	60,539
Percentage	27.1%	26.6%
Swing	▲3.6%	▼14.7%
	Third party	Fourth party
Leader	Frederick Fung & Bruce Liu	Lau Chin-shek
Party	ADPL	Independent
Alliance	Pro-democracy	Pro-democracy
Last election	1 seat, 35.2%	1 seat
Seats before	1	1
Seats won	1	1
Seat change	Steady	Steady
Popular vote	59,101	43,460
Percentage	26.4%	19.1%
Swing	▼8.8%	N/A
- Party with most votes in each District Council Constituency.

These are the Kowloon West results of the 2004 Hong Kong legislative election. The election was held on 12 September 2004 and all 4 seats in Kowloon West where consisted of Yau Tsim Mong District, Sham Shui Po District and Kowloon City District were contested. All four incumbents were re-elected, with Democratic Party's Lau Chin-shek ran as independent.

== Overall results ==
Before election:

↓
3	1
Pro-democracy	Pro-Beijing

Change in composition:

↓
3	1
Pro-democracy	Pro-Beijing

Party	Seats	Seats change	Contesting list(s)	Votes	%	% change
Democratic	1	0	1	60,539	26.6	– 14.7
ADPL	1	0	2	59,101	26.4	− 8.8
Independent	1	0	2	45,284	19.9	N/A
Pro-democracy camp	3	0	5	164,924	72.4	–4.1
DAB	1	0	1	61,770	27.1	–3.6
Pro-Beijing camp	1	0	1	61,770	27.1	+3.6
Independent or others	0	0	1	590	0.3	N/A
Turnout:				206,583	47.2	

== Candidates list ==
Legislative Election 2004: Kowloon West
List	Candidates	Votes	Of total (%)	± from prev.
DAB	Jasper Tsang Yok-sing Chung Kong-mo, Starry Lee Wai-king	61,770	27.1 (25+2.13)	+3.6
Democratic	James To Kun-sun Chan Ka-wai, Lam Ho-yeung, Ma Kee	60,539	26.6 (25+1.59)	−14.7
ADPL	Frederick Fung Kin-kee	45,649	20.5	−14.7
Nonpartisan	Lau Chin-shek	43,460	19.1	N/A
ADPL	Liu Sing-lee	13,452	5.9	N/A
Nonpartisan	Lau Yuk-shing, Leung Suet-fong, Lau Po-kwan	1,824	0.8	N/A
Turnout		227,694	54.74	+12.60
Total valid votes		227,694	100.00	
Rejected ballots		2,368		
Turnout		230,062	54.74	+12.60
Registered electors		420,259		

== See also ==
- Legislative Council of Hong Kong
- Hong Kong legislative elections
- 2004 Hong Kong legislative election
