= Sear Rogers International School =

School in Hong Kong

Coordinates: 22.3621°N 114.1146°E

Location
- Podium E, 4/F, Riviera Gardens, Tsuen Wan, New Territories, Hong Kong; Hong Kong

Information
- Motto: Growth, Nurture, Flourish
- Established: 1982
- Grades: Form 1 to Form 7
- Enrollment: 400
- Website: http://www.srishk.com/

Chinese name
- Traditional Chinese: 弘爵國際學校
- Simplified Chinese: 弘爵国际学校
Transcriptions
Standard Mandarin
- Hanyu Pinyin: Hóngjué Guójì Xuéxiào
Yue: Cantonese
- Jyutping: wang4 zoek3 gwok3 zai3 hok6 haau6

Sear Rogers International School (SRIS; Chinese: 弘爵國際學校) is a co-educational international secondary private school. Currently serving around 100 students in Tsuen Wan, its students take the International General Certificate of Secondary Education (IGCSE) followed by the GCE A/AS-Level.

== History ==
Sear Rogers International School (SRIS) was established in 1982. Students at the school mostly are from Southeast Asia and Hong Kong. SRIS is a co-educational English medium school for pupils aged 12–18 years (Grades 7 to 13, equivalent to F1 to F7).

In 1996, the school purchased Royden House International School, a school founded in 1958. According to the scholar Yoko Yamato, SRIS tuition fees in 2003 were less expensive than "most other" international schools. RHIS considered and rejected a merge with Pegasus Social Service Christian Organisation's Pegasus Philip Wong Kin Hang Christian Primary School in 2007 owing to Pegasus offering HK$1 rather than HK$50 million for the Tsuen Wan property.

== Curriculum ==
The school teaches the National Curriculum for England, which it adjusts for Hong Kong. Instruction is in English, and students who do not have English-language experience receive several hours of instruction in the language every week. It teaches Mandarin and French and offers extracurricular activities including dancing, performing arts, badminton, association football, and basketball.

== Notable alumni ==
- Abby Choi Tin-fung, Hong Kong model, influencer and socialite.
- Alex Kwong Kong-chi, former husband of Abby Choi Tin-fung.
- Chris Tam Fong-chun, partner of Abby Choi Tin-fung, son of the founder of Tam Jai Noodles.
