= Kai Tak Central & South (constituency) =

Constituency of Kowloon City District, Hong Kong

- Elected constituency for the Kowloon City District Council
- Boundary of Kai Tak Central & South in Kowloon City District
- District: Kowloon City
- Legislative Council constituency: Kowloon Central
- Population: 12,653 (2019)
- Electorate: 4,115 (2019)

Current constituency
- Created: 2015
- Number of members: One
- Member: Cheung King-fan (Independent)
- Created from: Kai Tak

Kai Tak Central & South (Chinese: 啟德中及南), previously Kai Tak South, is one of the 25 constituencies in the Kowloon City District of Hong Kong which was first created in for the 2015 District Council elections.

The constituency loosely covers part of Tak Long Estate as well as some other residential areas in San Po Kong and the previous Kai Tak Airport with the estimated population of 12,653.

== Councillors represented ==
Election	Member	Party
2015	He Huahan	Nonpartisan
2016	He Huahan	BPA/KWND
2019	Cheung King-fan	Independent

== Election results ==
=== 2010s ===
Kowloon City District Council Election, 2019: Kai Tak Central & South
Party	Candidate	Votes	%	±%
Independent	Cheung King-fan	1,574	53.52	
Civic	Sandra Leung Wing-yan	1,367	46.48	
Majority		207	7.04	
Turnout		2,966	72.10	
Independent gain from BPA		Swing		

Kowloon City District Council Election, 2015: Kai Tak South
Party	Candidate	Votes	%	±%
Nonpartisan	He Huahan	2,199	74.24	
Democratic	So Yee-man	763	25.76	
Majority		1,436	48.48	
Turnout		2,994	54.9	
Nonpartisan win (new seat)				
