= Ho Man Tin (constituency) =

Hong Kong constituency

- Elected constituency for the Kowloon City District Council
- Boundary of Ho Man Tin in Kowloon City District
- District: Kowloon City
- Legislative Council constituency: Kowloon Central
- Population: 19,625 (2019)
- Electorate: 9,994 (2019)

Current constituency
- Created: 1991
- Number of members: One
- Member: Vacant

Ho Man Tin (Chinese: 何文田) is one of the 25 constituencies in the Kowloon City District of Hong Kong which was created in 1991.

The constituency has an estimated population of 19,625.

== Councillors represented ==
=== 1991–94 ===
Election	First Member	First Party	Second Member	Second Party
1991	Wong Siu-yee	Independent	Chan King-wong	Independent

=== 1994 to present ===
Election	Member	Party
1994	Ng Ching-man	KCO
199?	Ng Ching-man	Independent
2006	Ng Ching-man	Civic
2011	Cheng Lee-ming	Independent
2019	Joshua Fung Man-tao→Vacant (Note: Resigned on 8 July 2021.)	Democratic

== Election results ==
=== 2010s ===
Kowloon City District Council Election, 2019: Ho Man Tin
Party	Candidate	Votes	%	±%
Democratic	Joshua Fung Man-tao	3,722	51.41	
Nonpartisan	Cheng Lee-ming	3,422	47.27	
Nonpartisan	Wasabi Chong Hiu-ying	96	1.33	
Majority		300	4.14	
Turnout		7,279	72.83	
Democratic gain from Nonpartisan		Swing		
