= Kai Tak North (constituency) =

- Elected constituency for the Kowloon City District Council
- Boundary of Kai Tak North in Kowloon City District
- District: Kowloon City
- Legislative Council constituency: Kowloon Central
- Population: 14,068 (2019)
- Electorate: 6,525 (2019)

Current constituency
- Created: 2015
- Number of members: One
- Member: Leung Yuen-ting ( BPA)
- Created from: Kai Tak

Kai Tak North (Chinese: 啟德北) is one of the 25 constituencies in the Kowloon City District of Hong Kong which was created in 2015.

The constituency loosely covers Kai Ching Estate and part of Tak Long Estate in San Po Kong with the estimated population of 16,562.

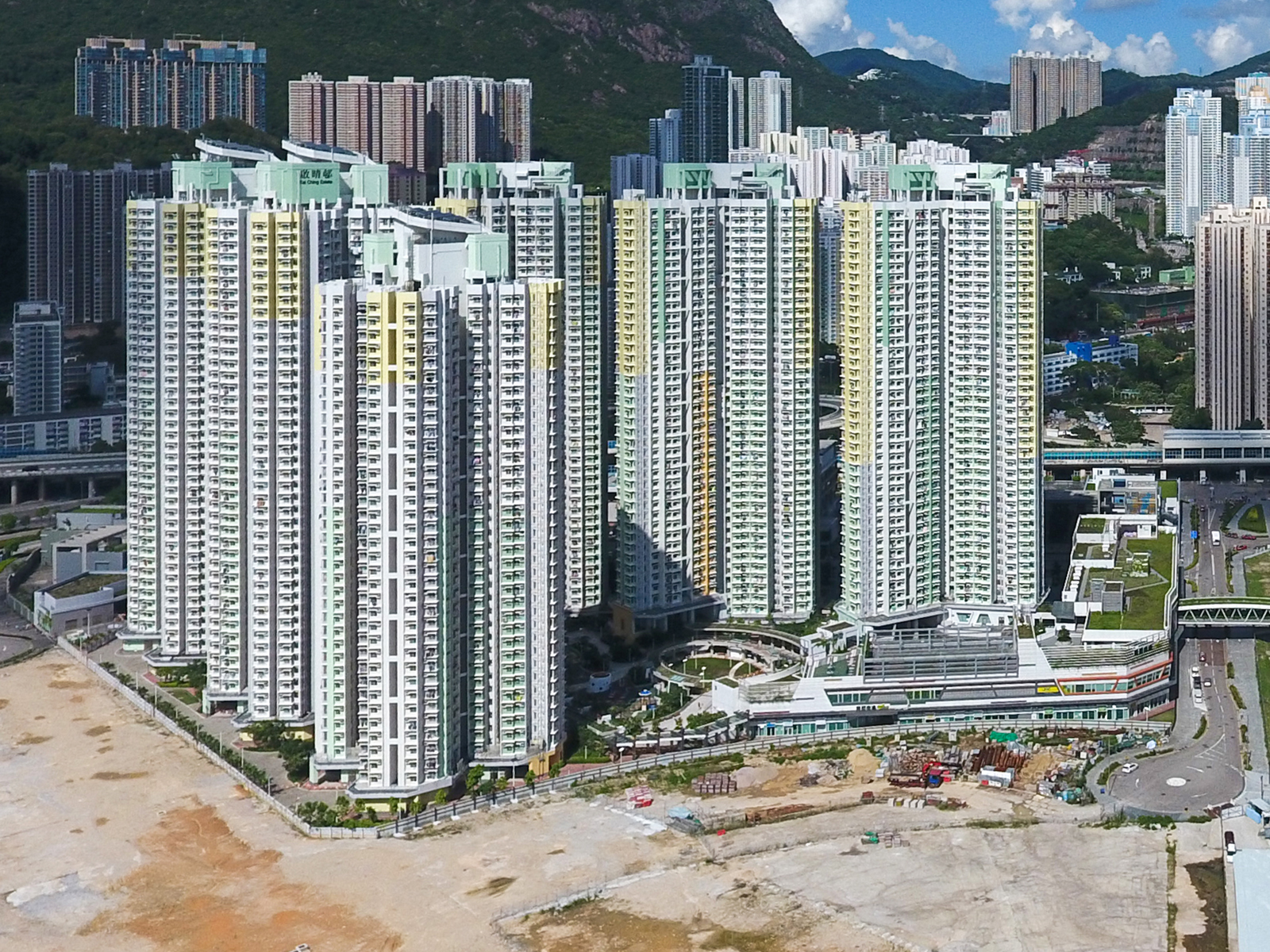
Kai Ching Estate

== Councillors represented ==
Election	Member	Party
2015	Leung Yuen-ting	Nonpartisan
2019	Leung Yuen-ting	BPA

== Election results ==
=== 2010s ===
Kowloon City District Council Election, 2019: Kai Tak North
Party	Candidate	Votes	%	±%
BPA	Leung Yuen-ting	2,480	54.48	−17.42
Nonpartisan	Tsang Chun-tat	2,043	44.88	
Nonpartisan	Wong Tsz-chun	29	0.64	
Majority		437	9.60	
Turnout		4,555	69.83	
BPA hold		Swing		

Kowloon City District Council Election, 2015: Kai Tak North
Party	Candidate	Votes	%	±%
Nonpartisan	Leung Yuen-ting	2,610	71.9	
ADPL	Jay Li Ting-fung	932	25.7	
Nonpartisan	Miranda Lam Hei-ting	73	2.0	
Nonpartisan	Chan Po-yuk	16	0.4	
Majority		1,678	46.2	
Turnout		3,653	57.4	
Nonpartisan win (new seat)				
