= Ma Tau Kok (constituency) =

- 馬頭角
- Elected constituency for the Kowloon City District Council
- Boundary of Ma Tau Kok in Kowloon City District
- District: Kowloon City
- Legislative Council constituency: Kowloon Central
- Population: 13,958 (2019)
- Electorate: 6,718 (2019)

Current constituency
- Created: 1991
- Number of members: One
- Member: Vacant

Ma Tau Kok (Chinese: 馬頭角) is one of the 24 constituencies in the Kowloon City District of Hong Kong which was created in 1991.

The constituency has an estimated population of 13,958 as of 2015.

== Councillors represented ==
Election	Member	Party
1991	Wen Choy-bon	FTU
1994	Li Lin	KCDRA
199?	Li Lin	Independent
2015	Kwan Ho-yeung	DAB
2019	Ma Hei-pang→Vacant (Note: Resigned on 28 September 2021.)	Democratic

== Election results ==
=== 2010s ===
Kowloon City District Council Election, 2019: Ma Tau Kok
Party	Candidate	Votes	%	±%
Democratic	Ma Hei-pang	2,499	52.79	
DAB	Kwan Ho-yeung	2,195	46.37	
Nonpartisan	Ching Man-ki	40	0.85	
Majority		304	6.33	
Turnout		4,756	70.82	
Democratic gain from DAB		Swing		
