= Kai Tak (constituency) =

Former constituency in Kowloon City District, Hong Kong

- Former Elected constituency for the Kowloon City District Council
- Boundary of Kai Tak in Kowloon City District
- Region: Kowloon City District
- Electorate: 7,518 (2011)

Former constituency
- Created: 1991
- Abolished: 2015
- Number of members: One
- Member: Yeung Chun-yu (ADPL) (last)
- Replaced by: Sung Wong Toi, Kai Tak North and Kai Tak South

Kai Tak is a former constituency in the Kowloon City District.

The constituency returned one district councillor to the Kowloon City District Council, with an election every four years. The seat was last held by Yeung Chun-yu of the Association for Democracy and People's Livelihood before it was abolished in 2015.

Kai Tak constituency was loosely based on the old Kai Tak Airport part of Ma Tau Kok with estimated population of 20,636 in 2011.

== Councillors represented ==
Election	Member	Party
1991	Lam Ming	Independent
1994	David Chu Chor-sing	Independent
199?	David Chu Chor-sing	Progressive Alliance
2002 by-election	Bruce Liu Sing-lee	ADPL
2011	Yeung Chun-yu	ADPL
2015	Constituency abolished	

== Election results ==
=== 2010s ===
Kowloon City District Council Election, 2011: Kai Tak
Party	Candidate	Votes	%	±%
ADPL	Yeung Chun-yu	1,427	49.6	+6.8
Economic Synergy	Alexander Ip Chi-wai	636	22.1	−4.2
DAB (FTU)	Cheung Fan-lan	625	21.7	−9.2
People Power	Lee Hon-sam	190	6.6	
ADPL hold		Swing		

=== 2000s ===
Kowloon City District Council Election, 2007: Kai Tak
Party	Candidate	Votes	%	±%
ADPL	Liu Sing-lee	863	42.8	−21.6
DAB	Szeto Kin-wa	623	30.9	−0.8
Liberal	Alexander Ip Chi-wai	531	26.3	+22.3
ADPL hold		Swing		

Kowloon City District Council Election, 2003: Kai Tak
Party	Candidate	Votes	%	±%
ADPL	Liu Sing-lee	1,454	64.4	+17.7
DAB	Hui Ching-po	715	31.7	+4.5
Nonpartisan	Alexander Ip Chi-wai	90	4.0	+1.7
ADPL hold		Swing		

Kai Tak By-election, 2002
Party	Candidate	Votes	%	±%
ADPL	Liu Sing-lee	886	46.7	
DAB	Hui Ching-po	516	27.2	−14.6
Democratic	Lam Ho-yeung	215	11.3	
HKPA	Lam Ming	187	9.9	−37.0
Independent	Alexander Ip Chi-wai	43	2.3	
ADPL gain from HKPA		Swing		

=== 1990s ===
Kowloon City District Council Election, 1999: Kai Tak
Party	Candidate	Votes	%	±%
HKPA	David Chu Chor-sing	992	56.9	+0.1
DAB	Hui Ching-po	729	41.8	
HKPA hold		Swing		

Kowloon City District Council Election, 1994: Kai Tak
Party	Candidate	Votes	%	±%
Independent	David Chu Chor-sing	851	56.8	+10.7
LDF	Pao Ping-wing	629	42.0	
Independent gain from Independent		Swing		

Kowloon City District Council Election, 1991: Kai Tak
Party	Candidate	Votes	%	±%
Independent	Lam Ming	718	53.0	
Independent	David Chu Chor-sing	624	46.1	
Independent win (new seat)				
