= Murder of Diao Aiqing =

Unsolved murder in China

- Diao Aiqing
- Native name: 南大碎尸案
- Location: Nanjing, Jiangsu, China
- Date: 9 January 1996 (disappearance), 19 January 1996 (body found)
- Victim: Diao Aiqing
- Perpetrator: Unknown
- Motive: Unknown
- Verdict: None
- Convictions: None

Diao Aiqing (Chinese: 刁爱青; pinyin: Diāo Àiqīng; 11 March 1977 – January 1996) was an 18-year-old Chinese student who was murdered and dismembered. On 19 January 1996, ten days after she went missing, her body—which had been cut into more than 2,000 pieces—was discovered at several locations near Nanjing University in Jiangsu Province. The case remains unsolved to this day and is one of China’s most notorious criminal cases.

== Names ==
The case is officially known in China as the Nanjing 1/19 Dismemberment Case (南京“1·19”碎尸案), though it is also known as the Nanjing University Dismemberment Case (南大碎尸案) or the Diao Aiqing Case (刁爱青案).

== Background ==
Diao Aiqing was born in March 1977 in Shengao, Jiangyan District in the city of Taizhou, Jiangsu. She was the youngest of two siblings. According to her older sister, Diao Aihua, their family lived poorly, and she (Aihua) dropped out of school to find work. Meanwhile, Diao continued her education and performed academically well. In 1994, after failing her gaokao exam, Diao repeated her studies at Yuying Academy in Jiangyan. Diao passed the gaokao on her second try and successfully enrolled at Nanjing University. She arrived in Nanjing in October 1995 to attend the university's School of Adult Education. She majored in computer applications at the Department of Information Management. To avoid disrupting her studies, her family limited communications with Diao, even as far as not notifying her about the death of her grandfather and sister's marriage. Diao was described as “introverted and simple”. She also did not enjoy interacting with people.

== Disappearance ==
On 9 January 1996, Diao's roommate was punished for the illegal use of an electrical appliance. Diao was expected to pay a partial amount of the fine, leading to a conflict with the dormitory management. Afterwards she left the building, located in the Gulou district campus, and did not return. Diao was last seen alive wearing a red coat with a black lining. She was reported missing, but her family was not notified by the authorities until the discovery of her body on 19 January.

== Discovery ==
The discovery of Diao's remains in the winter of January 1996 was first reported by a sanitation worker who found meat in a bag while sweeping Huaqiao Road in Xinjiekou subdistrict, around 1 kilometre south of the Gulou campus. Seeing as the meat was pre-cut into even slices, the worker believed the bag's contents to be pork and brought it home. While preparing the meat, three human fingers were found. The worker reported the discovery to the police who confirmed they were from a human.

Human remains in plastic-wrapped packages were eventually discovered across eight locations in central Nanjing. To the southwest of Gulou campus, there were packages at a construction site on Huaqiao Road and Dajianyin Lane south of the site while to the southeast, bags were found on Xiaofen Bridge. At Nanjing University's main building, remains were found at main gate entrance and a nearby sports stadium. The police later confirmed the scattered remains were of Diao's and asked her father to visit Nanjing. Between 20 and 30 January, Diao's head and clothes were found around Shuizuogang Road, north of the university.

== Investigation ==
More than 2,000 human remains were recovered, most cut into rectangular slices. Diao's head and internal organs were boiled for several days. Crucial organs including the heart, liver and spleen were never found. The forensics team was only able to identify the remains as belonging to a female through the analysis of body hair and muscle tissue. Relatives were able to identify her through a mole on her right cheek. A senior officer involved in the case described the killing as “really cruel”. The officer added that pieces of flesh were dissected with high precision only achieved by an individual with great understanding of anatomy. Police concluded that the murderer must have been a professional butcher or surgeon.

Students and teachers became the subject of investigation. Two suspect profiles were brought up, including a single, physically fit, middle-aged male. However, the university department could not find any individuals that matched the characteristics of the profile. A major three-month investigation was launched in the university and the areas around, but no major clues of the crime were found and the case failed to make any progress. In 2016, on the 20th anniversary of the discovery of Diao's remains, the Criminal Investigation Department of China's Ministry of Public Security stated that the case is still “under investigation” and that the investigation remained with the Nanjing Municipal Public Security Bureau.

== Reaction ==
Nanjing University refunded Diao's tuition fees. Diao's family left Nanjing for their hometown five days later. In 2021, Diao's family filed a lawsuit against Nanjing University for ¥1.62 million (US$246,000) for damages. Diao Aihua said that the lawsuit was to “seek justice” rather than compensation.

This case has been compared to the Los Angeles Black Dahlia due to its similarities.

== See also ==
- Murder of Abby Choi
- Murder of Junko Furuta
