= Kowloon Federation of Associations =

Kowloon Federation of Associations 九龍社團聯會
- General Secretary: Ngan Man-yu
- Founded: 1997
- Headquarters: 14th Floor, Nathan Centre, 580G Nathan Road, Mong Kok, Hong Kong
- Newspaper: Kowloon Post
- Ideology: Conservatism (HK)
- Regional affiliation: Pro-Beijing
- Colors
- Legislative Council: 1 / 90
- District Councils: 25 / 470
- NPC (HK deputies): 1 / 36

Website
- https://klnfas.hk/tc/

Kowloon Federation of Associations（Chinese: 九龍社團聯會）Is a Hong Kong political party and federation of associations in Kowloon. It was founded in 1997, it's current Secretary-General is Ngan Man-yu, a former Legislative Council Member and DAB member. It's currently holds 1 seat in the Legislative Council, Kitson Yang, and 25 seats in the District Council. It's official newspaper is "Kowloon Post", which was established in 2016.

The Kowloon Federation of Associations is Pro-Beijing, with most of its members also being members of the flagship Pro-Beijing political party DAB and FTU.

== Electoral History ==
=== Legislative Council ===
Election	Number of popular votes	% of popular votes	GC seats	FC seats	EC seats	Total seats	+/−
2021	35,702	2.64	1	0	0	1 / 90	1▲
2025	28,163▼	2.14▼	1	0	0	1 / 90	1

Category:1997 establishments in Hong Kong Category:Conservative parties in Hong Kong
