= Murder of Abby Choi =

2023 Hong Kong murder case

Abby Choi
- 蔡天鳳
- Choi in 2022
- Born: 15 July 1994; Hainan, People's Republic of China
- Died: 21 February 2023 (aged 28); Lung Mei, Tai Po District, Hong Kong
- Cause of death: Murder (blunt trauma to head)
- Resting place: Po Lin Monastery
- Occupations: Model; socialite; influencer
- Spouse: Alex Kwong Kong-chi (m. 2012; div. 2015)
- Partner: Chris Tam Fong-chun (Note: The couple only held a wedding ceremony in 2016, but did not legally register their marriage.)
- Children: 4

Abby Choi Tin-fung (Note: In this Hong Kong name, the surname is Choi. In accordance with Hong Kong custom, the Western-style name is Abby Choi and the Chinese-style name is Choi Tin-fung.) (Chinese: 蔡天鳳: 15 July 1994 – 21 February 2023) was a Hong Kong model, influencer, and socialite who was murdered and dismembered. First reported missing on 21 February 2023, she was found dead three days later at a village house in Lung Mei, a rural outskirt of Tai Po District. Her dismembered remains were found hidden inside a refrigerator, some even being boiled in a pot of carrot soup. The gruesome details of Choi's murder has attracted widespread attention in Hong Kong—where violent crimes are rare—and even made into international headlines.

Police have arrested four suspects in relation to the murder, including Choi's ex-husband Alex Kwong, and her former brother-in-law and parents-in-law. Kwong unsuccessfully attempted to flee Hong Kong before his arrest, leading to further arrests of three suspects who allegedly assisted his hiding and escape. The murder has been described by police as 'well-planned' and is believed to have transpired over a monetary dispute involving a luxury apartment. The murder trial began on 21 September 2026 and is expected to last about 45 days.

== Personal background ==
=== Life and career ===
Abby Choi Tin-fung was a Hong Kong fashion model and influencer born on 15 July 1994, in Hainan, mainland China, where she lived until she relocated to Hong Kong with her family at the age of five.

Some time after Choi's birth, her mother Cheung Yin-fa (張燕花) divorced her biological father and married Tsoi Cho-san (蔡楚生), with whom she had two other daughters. Cheung and Tsoi later made a fortune by operating construction businesses in mainland China. Choi's personal net worth at the time of her death was worth about 300 million Hong Kong dollars (US$38.3 million).

Choi was well-known in the fashion industry and had amassed more than 100,000 followers on Instagram. She regularly attended the Paris Fashion Week and had appeared in magazines including Elle, Harper’s Bazaar and Vogue. Less than two weeks before her death, Choi was featured on the cover of fashion and luxury lifestyle magazine L’Officiel Monaco. She was also an advocate for animal welfare and had co-founded a charity dedicated to rescuing stray animals.

=== Relationships ===
Choi married Alex Kwong Kong-chi (鄺港智) in 2014 when she was eighteen years old and they had two children together. Throughout the marriage, Alex Kwong was unemployed and therefore relied on Choi's family for their livelihood and living expenses. The two later divorced but maintained a close relationship; Choi provided Kwong's family with financial support, including a HK$72.8 million (US$9.3 million) luxury apartment in Kadoorie Hill for her children and former in-laws to live in. Her former brother-in-law, Anthony Kwong Kong-kit (鄺港傑), also served as her chauffeur and was a business partner for a pancake stall which was later sued for more than HK$130,000 (US$16,600) in contractual disputes.

Choi later married Chris Tam Fong-chun (譚方駿), whose father had founded Hong Kong restaurant chain TamJai Yunnan Mixian. The two held a wedding ceremony in 2016 but never legally registered their marriage. They had two children together. Tam also had good relations with her former husband Kwong; the three had met during their school years and often hung out together.

== Disappearance and discovery of Choi's remains ==
Choi was reported missing on 21 February 2023 after failing to pick up her daughter from school. She was last seen that afternoon at her luxury apartment block in Kadoorie Hill, being picked up by her former brother-in-law Anthony Kwong – who she hired as her personal driver. The two were due to collect the daughter together. Following the missing person's report, the former in-laws were contacted by police, but made 'plenty of lies and smokescreens' to mislead the investigation. Police eventually relied on surveillance camera footage and the vehicle's GPS records, which revealed that Choi had been driven to Lung Mei Village in Tai Po. More than 150 police detectives were dispatched to conduct door-to-door interviews and to review video footage from security cameras and dashcams.

On 24 February 2023, three days after Choi's disappearance, the beheaded and dismembered remains of 28-year-old Choi were discovered at the ground-floor flat of a village house. Choi's dismembered legs were hidden inside a refrigerator, while her skull and ribs were found in a large pot of soup containing carrots and minced meat. A hole measuring 6.5 cm × 5.5 cm (2.6 in × 2.2 in) was found on the rear right side of the skull, believed to be where Choi was fatally struck. Human tissue was also scattered around the unit. A meat slicer and electric saw believed to be involved were also found. Police described the flat as being 'carefully prepared [...] to cut up a body' for a 'premeditated and well-planned' killing. The unit had been rented by Choi's former father-in-law, and was entirely unfurnished except for a couch and table. To avoid blood stains, the walls had been covered with a sail, and the suspects had donned face shields and raincoats during the crime.

Choi's other remains, including her torso and hands, were not found at the crime scene. The suspects had also thrown away bags of important evidence; surveillance camera footage captured a male suspect loading a large white plastic box onto a vehicle. Search efforts occurred across the city, with police mobilising excavators, bulldozers, and more than a hundred officers in protective gear to sift through sewage and the North East New Territories Landfill in Ta Kwu Ling. Divers from the police tactical unit Flying Tigers were also deployed for underwater searches at a water catchment area in the Tseung Kwan O cemetery.

== Investigations ==
=== Arrests ===
==== Related to Choi's death ====
Police made their first three arrests on 24 February 2023 – the same day Choi's remains were found, which included Choi's personal driver and former brother-in-law Anthony Kwong, father-in-law Kwong Kau (鄺球), and mother-in-law Jenny Li Sui-heung. After a day of citywide police manhunt, her former husband Alex Kwong became the fourth to be arrested. He was found at the Tung Chung pier waiting for a speedboat to flee Hong Kong. He was carrying HK$500,000 (US$63,900) in cash and HK$4 million (US$511,000) worth of luxury watches.

Police charged the mother-in-law with perverting the course of justice, while proceeding with murder charges against Alex Kwong and his brother and father. The three were also later charged with preventing the lawful burial of Choi's body in December 2023. Under Hong Kong laws, murder carries a mandatory sentence of life imprisonment. The death penalty was originally the sole legal punishment for murder, but was fully abolished in 1993. The four were denied bail and held in remand pending investigations.

Alex Kwong's arrest also restarted an unrelated theft trial from almost a decade prior, for which he had failed to show up to court and became wanted by police. He had scammed HK$6.3 million (US$813,000) worth of gold and jewellery across seven incidents between 2013 and 2015. On 19 June 2024, he was sentenced to 3 1/2 years of imprisonment for six charges of theft and one charge of jumping bail, all of which he pleaded guilty to.

==== Related to Kwong's attempted escape ====
Police arrested a fifth suspect on 26 February 2023, 47-year-old Wu Zhi-rong (伍志荣), a mistress of Kwong Kau. She was said to have helped hide Alex Kwong before his attempt to abscond, She was charged with abetting a murder suspect and was released on bail. On 2 March, a sixth suspect – 41-year-old Henry Lam Shun (林舜), an employee of a yacht rental company – was arrested on suspicion of aiding and abetting Kwong's attempted escape for a payment of HK$100,000 (US$12,800). Lam was granted bail. On 7 March, a seventh suspect, Irene Pun Hau-yin (潘巧賢) – a 29-year-old Hongkonger and friend of Alex Kwong – was arrested in Shenzhen, China for abetting Kwong in his attempted escape and was handed over to Hong Kong authorities. Pun was granted bail but banned from travelling out of Hong Kong. Lam and Pun were additionally charged with perverting the course of justice in April 2024 for conspiring to assist Kwong's escape.

=== Motive ===
Police has described the murder of Choi as 'premeditated and well-planned'. Investigators believe that her former father-in-law, Kwong Kau – a former police sergeant who resigned in 2005 after being accused of rape, had masterminded the murder over a monetary dispute. Despite Choi's divorce, she maintained close relations with her ex-husband and former in-laws. She had purchased a HK$72.8 million (US$9.3 million) luxury apartment in 2019 for them and her children to live in, and had registered the property under the elder Kwong's name to save more than HK$7 million (US$893,000) in stamp duty. The apartment had a floor area of 1,820 sq ft (169 m^{2}) and was located in Kadoorie Hill, one of Hong Kong's most exclusive neighbourhoods and home to some of the city's wealthiest. Choi later planned to sell the property, while promising to relocate them elsewhere. (Note: Choi's lawyers advised that she could take the sale proceeds, if she had proof that she had paid for the apartment.) Kwong Kau was fiercely opposed to the sale, arguing with her on several occasions and allegedly leading him to orchestrate her murder.

Weeks after Choi's death, her mother filed a court injunction to forbid Kwong from dealing the property, seeking to declare her daughter the beneficial owner. Hong Kong laws forbid people from benefitting from their crimes.

== Suspects ==
1. Alex Kwong Kong-chi (鄺港智): 28, Choi's former husband, charged with murder and preventing the lawful and decent burial of a body
2. Anthony Kwong Kong-kit (鄺港傑): 31, Choi's former brother-in-law and chauffeur, charged with murder and preventing the lawful and decent burial of a body
3. Kwong Kau (鄺球): 65, Choi's former father-in-law, charged with murder and preventing the lawful and decent burial of a body
4. Jenny Li Shui-heung (李瑞香): 63, Choi's former mother-in-law – charged with perverting the course of justice
5. Wu Zhi-rong (伍志荣): 47, mistress of Kwong Kau, charged with assisting a murder suspect
6. Henry Lam Shun (林舜): 41, friend of Alex Kwong and yacht rental agent, charged with abetting a murder suspect and perverting the course of justice
7. Irene Pun Hau-yin (潘巧賢):29, friend of Alex Kwong, charged with abetting a murder suspect and perverting the course of justice

== Legal proceedings ==
=== Pretrial developments ===
A pre-trial conference was held on 8 May 2023, when six of the seven suspects behind Choi's murder appeared in court. The prosecution revealed that bloodstains matching to the DNA of Choi were found inside the car of her former brother-in-law, and over 30 exhibits seized by the police, including knives, chainsaws and hammers from the village, would be sent for DNA processing.

=== Sentencing of Irene Pun and Henry Lam ===
On 27 June 2025, Henry Lam and Irene Pun were each sentenced to six months in prison for one count of conspiracy to pervert the course of justice. Magistrate Philip Chan Chee-fai of Kowloon City Court stated that the pair had persistently tried to prevent the police from locating and capturing Alex Kwong, but he accepted that there was insufficient evidence to prove that they were aware of Alex Kwong's involvement in the murder of Abby Choi.

=== Sentencing of Jenny Li ===
On 28 October 2025, Jenny Li was sentenced to 18 months' imprisonment for obstruction of justice and interfering with the murder investigation. In his verdict, Judge Stanley Chan Kwong-chi stated that Li was a "doting parent who spoiled her child" by not intervening in Alex Kwong's wrongful actions, helping him to abscond and never took the effort to correct his wrongdoings, which could have averted the events that followed.

=== Murder trial ===
Three of the suspects, Alex Kwong, Anthony Kwong and Kwong Kau, were set to stand trial for the murder of Choi on 21 September 2026, and the trial was expected to last for about 45 days before Deputy High Court Judge Sir Brian Keith. Prior to nine-member jury was assembled to hear the case, both Alex and Anthony Kwong pleaded guilty to lesser charges of preventing the lawful burial of Choi's corpse, but they would still stand trial together with their father for the murder charge, to which the brothers pleaded not guilty.

In her opening statement on 30 September 2026, prosecutor Charlotte Draycott contended that the underlying motive behind Choi's murder was monetary disputes, arising from the victim's attempt in 2022 to sell the luxury apartment in favor of another new residence, which incurred the unhappiness of Kwong Kau. The prosecution also alleged that this led to Kwong Kau planning the murder of Choi in order to keep the apartment, and therefore he and his two sons orchestrated the killing and subsequent disposal of the corpse. The autopsy report was also presented to the jury, and the prosecution cited the report's findings that there were injuries found on Choi's skull, which were caused by a blunt instrument. The hammer seized by the police was matched to the wounds based on its shape.

On 13 October 2026, Chris Tam Fong-chun, Choi's partner, came to court as a witness to testify during the trial, recounting the conflicts between Choi and her former in-laws. In one instance, according to Tam, during a heated argument between Choi and her former parents-in-law, one of them allegedly called Choi a "birthing machine". Tam described it as a "watershed moment" that signified the breakdown in their relationship.

The prosecution also submitted evidence which showed that during the few weeks leading up to the murder, the defendants bought an electric saw, a meat mincer and a refrigerator as part of their plot to kill Choi. A female shop assistant from a kitchenware shop anonymously testified in court that a white-haired man about 1.7m tall, identified as Kwong Kau based on the shop's CCTV footage, had come to her shop to buy several expensive high quality meat mincers, as well as a 14-by-14-inch soup pot, a 15-inch chopping board and an 11-inch ladle, which costed HK$9,153 in total.

== Responses ==
The death of Choi shocked the community of Hong Kong, where rates of violent crime are very low, and also made headlines internationally. The high-profile nature of the crime also brought attention to notorious past murder cases, including serial killer Lam Kor-wan, the 1985 Braemar Hill murders, the 1999 Hello Kitty murder case, and the 2013 murder of Glory Chau and Moon Siu.

Hong Kong actor Aaron Kwok and his wife Moka Fang were reportedly devastated over the death of Choi, who was close friends with the couple, and they offered condolences, describing her as a good friend.

Choi's current husband, with whom she had two children, remembered her as a wife and mother who was often attentive and caring for her family, and stated he would take care of the children, including his two step-children. Choi's father-in-law also regarded her as a daughter who was not his own but whom he doted on. Similarly, Choi's mother also made tributes to her eldest daughter and talked about the good memories she shared with her daughter, whom she described as filial.

Thousands of fans and netizens worldwide offered condolences for the victim, with some netizens from mainland China suggesting that the perpetrators deserved the death penalty for murdering Choi, and were disappointed at the fact that it was not applicable in Hong Kong despite its usage in mainland China for severe crimes. The school that Choi's children attended offered counseling sessions to her children and any other students affected by the horrific nature of the crime. The ritual to pay respects to Choi was held on 11 March 2023. Choi's funeral was conducted on 18 June 2023.

The community at Tai Po's Lung Mei Village, where most of Choi's dismembered body parts were recovered, also made plans to perform Taoist rituals to "calm the spirit" of the deceased, due to the horrific and tragic nature of her death. Choi's family members and friends gathered outside the crime scene to show respects.

== See also ==
- Lam Kor-wan
- List of solved missing person cases (2020s)
- Murder of Diao Aiqing
