= Sacred Hill =

Former hill in Hong Kong

Coordinates: 22.325249°N 114.190881°E

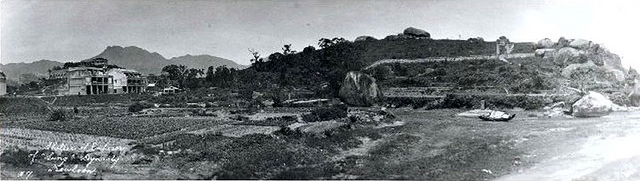
c. 1920s. The boulder bearing the three carved characters is situated on top of the hill (right); both were protected as sacred relics by a special ordinance in 1899. The gate, the steps to the inscription and the balustrade around the boulder were erected in 1915. The sacred hill was levelled and the boulder was broken up in blasting operations to extend Kai Tak Airport.

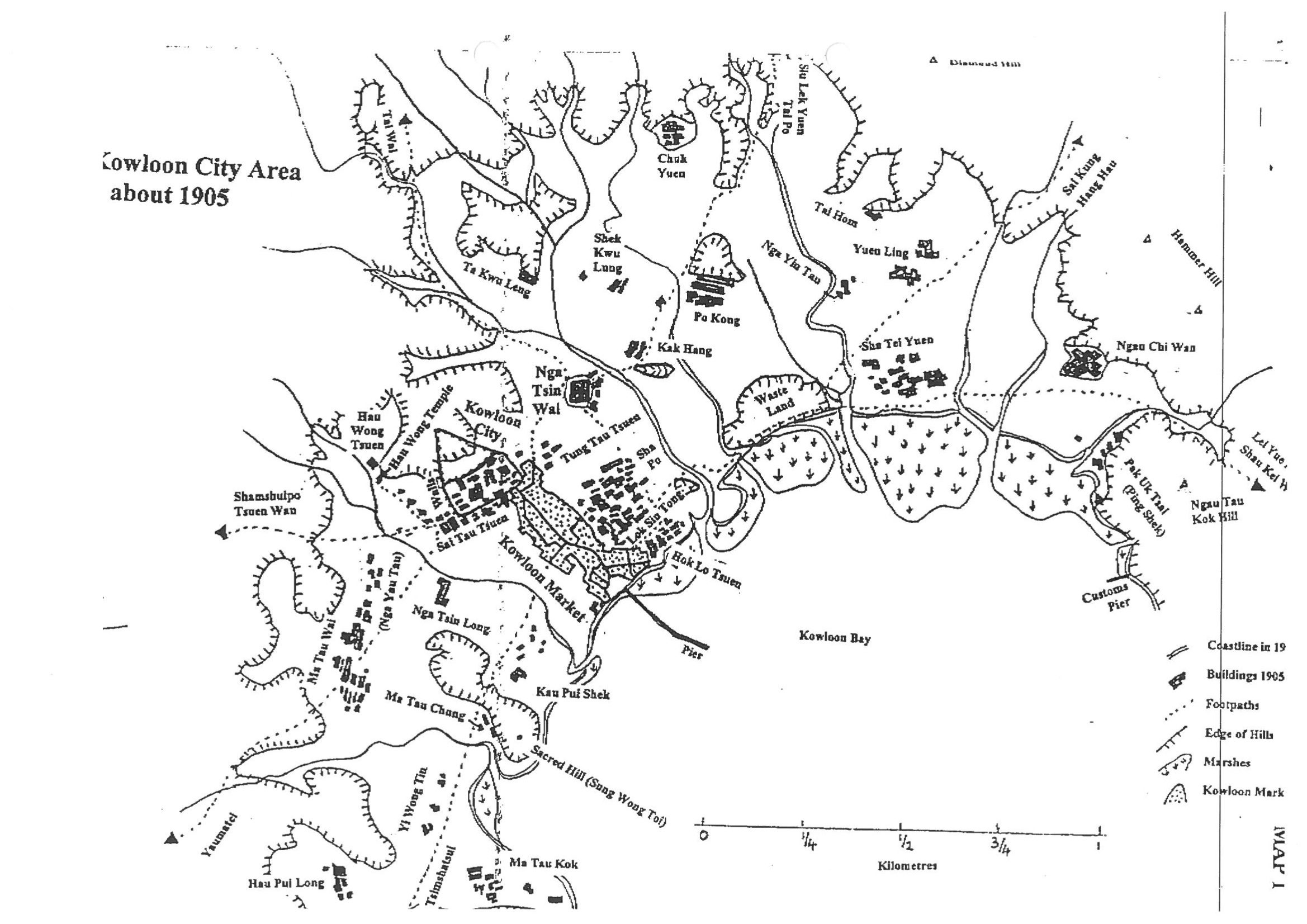
Map of Kowloon City area about 1905 showing Sacred Hill.

Sacred Hill (Chinese: 聖山) is a disappeared hill in Kowloon, Hong Kong. It is where a historical boulder called Sung Wong Toi was previously located. Sacred Hill is also known as Hill of the King of Sung in some old maps. The name "Sacred Hill" is widely believed to be a name given by foreigners as no earlier corresponding Chinese name is known.

It is believed that Emperor Duanzong of the Southern Song dynasty had settled on the hill for a period of time when he was escaping from Yuan troops. The hill was partly flattened during the Japanese occupation of Hong Kong, when the Japanese determined to expand the nearby Kai Tak Airport at the expense of the sacred hill. The rest of the hill was levelled during the 1950s for further airport expansion. The remaining part of the Sung Wong Toi relic was moved to the Sung Wong Toi Garden, immediately west of the former Sacred Hill.

During work on the Kai Tak Development, many relics from the Song and Yuan periods have been found in the environs of Sacred Hill.
