= Kitson Yang =

Hong Kong politician

- 楊永杰
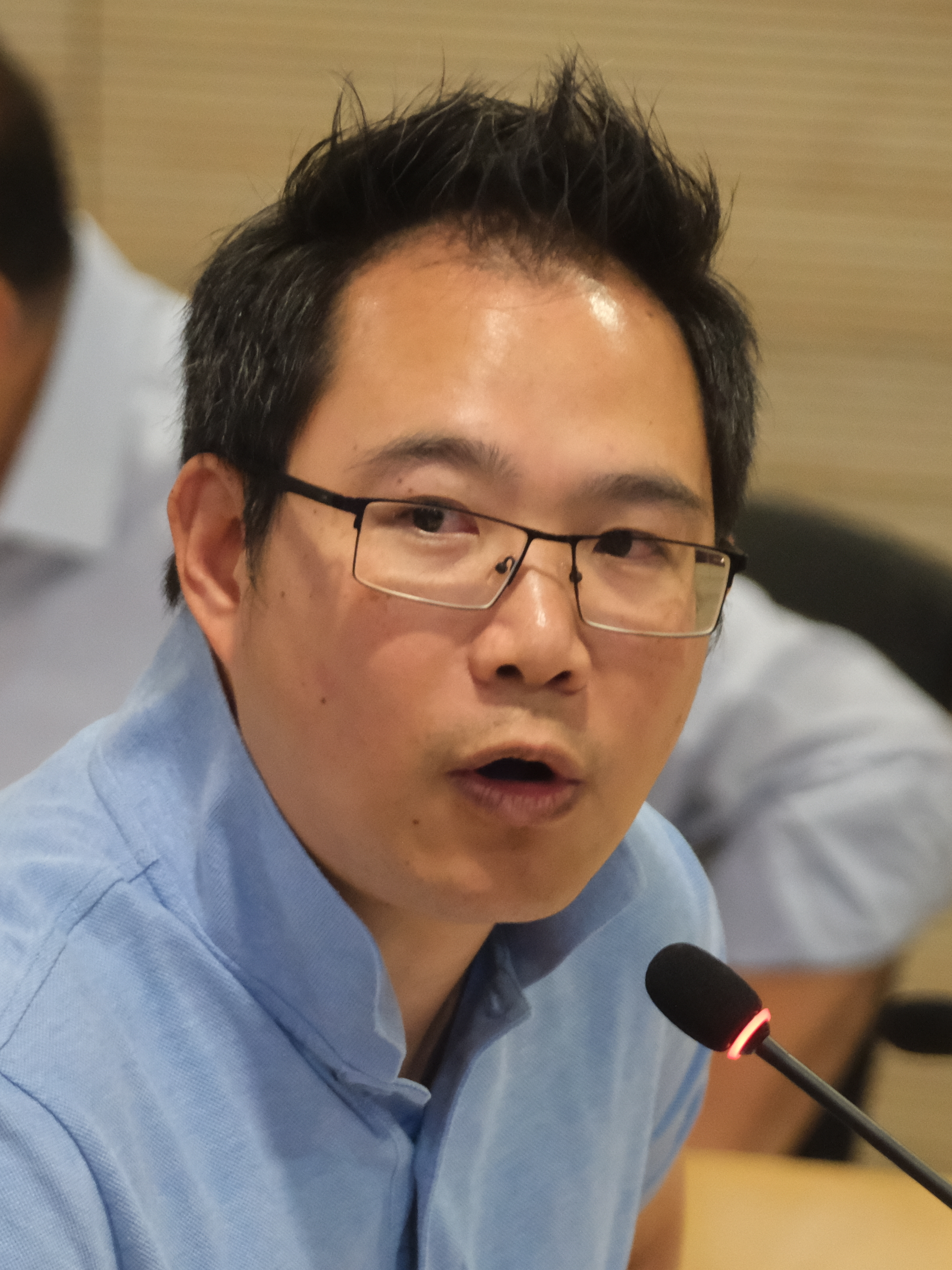
- Yang in 2023

Chairman of the Kowloon City District Council
- Incumbent
- Assumed office 9 September 2021
- Deputy: Ho Hin-ming
- Preceded by: Siu Leong-sing

Member of the Legislative Council
- Incumbent
- Assumed office 1 January 2022
- Preceded by: Constituency created
- Constituency: Kowloon Central

Member of the Kowloon City District Council
- Incumbent
- Assumed office 1 January 2008
- Preceded by: Au Ka-shing
- Constituency: Lok Man

Member of the Election Committee
- In office 1 February 2012 – 31 January 2017
- Constituency: Hong Kong and Kowloon District Councils

Personal details
- Born: 1982 (age 43–44)
- Citizenship: Chinese (Hong Kong)
- Party: Kowloon Federation of Associations
- Other political affiliations: Kowloon West New Dynamic (until 2018)

Kitson Yang Wing-kit (Chinese: 楊永杰, born 1982) is a Hong Kong politician who is the elected Legislative Council member for Kowloon Central constituency since 2021.

Though Hong Kong medical schools teach in English, Yang in July 2022 criticized a program that recruits doctors from medical schools outside of Hong Kong, for requiring that English be the language of instruction.

In January 2023, Yang said he would stage a protest to oppose building public housing in Kai Tak. On 1 February 2023, Yang said that the public housing might block views for those living in private apartment complexes. On 8 February 2023, Yang was the only person out of 35 lawmakers who did not vote in support of the plan to build public housing on the site; he cast a blank vote.

In March 2023, Mok Kin-shing said of Yang "We can see that even the legislator who had said he would organise protests to oppose the scheme now has made a U-turn and supported the scheme," as analysts said that John Lee would aim for "all votes yes" to show Beijing his leadership, with one lawmaker saying "Probably the central government is concerned about Hong Kong's housing problem and that the government does not want to see more opposing views at Legco."

In December 2025, he was re-elected through Kowloon Central constituency.

In January 2026, Hong Kong media reported that delivery invoices for supplies distributed at the Ko Shan Road community “living room” listed suppliers linked to companies associated with individuals connected to Kitson Yang, who serves as chairman of the Community Care Association and a director of related local organisations. The reports highlighted potential conflicts of interest and noted that Yang did not respond to requests for comment.

== Electoral history ==
2021 legislative election: Kowloon Central
Party	Candidate	Votes	%	±%
DAB	Starry Lee Wai-king	95,976	68.70	N/A
Independent	Yang Wing-kit	35,702	25.56	N/A
Independent	Tam Heung-man	8,028	5.75	N/A

2019 local elections at the Kowloon City District Council: Lok Man
Party	Candidate	Votes	%	±%
Independent	Yang Wing-kit	3,312	55.14	−4.53
Democratic Coalition	Vincent Lam	2,694	44.86	N/A
Majority		618	10.28	
Turnout		8,427	68.71	+21.23
Independent hold		Swing		

2015 local elections at the Kowloon City District Council: Lok Man
Party	Candidate	Votes	%	±%
Independent	Yang Wing-kit	2,310	59.67	N/A
Independent	Pong Yat-ming	1,561	40.33	N/A
Majority		749	19.35	
Turnout		5,103	47.48	−0.71
Independent hold		Swing		

2011 local elections at the Kowloon City District Council: Lok Man
Party	Candidate	Votes	%	±%
Independent	Yang Wing-kit	Uncontested		N/A
Independent hold		Swing		

2007 local elections at the Kowloon City District Council: Lok Man
Party	Candidate	Votes	%	±%
Independent	Yang Wing-kit	2,135	55.35	N/A
Democratic Coalition	Au Ka-shing	1,799	42.58	−4.51
Majority		413	10.71	
Independent gain from Democratic Coalition		Swing		

Political offices
Preceded by Au Ka-shing	Member of Kowloon City District Council; Representative for Lok Man; 2008–present	Incumbent
Legislative Council of Hong Kong
New constituency	Member of Legislative Council; Representative for Kowloon Central; 2022–present	Incumbent
