= Bruce Liu (politician) =

Hong Kong politician

- 廖成利
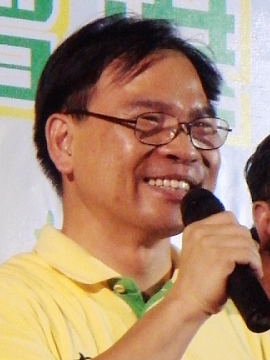

Member of the Legislative Council
- In office 21 December 1996 – 30 June 1998
- In office 11 October 1995 – 30 June 1997
- Preceded by: Lam Kui-shing
- Succeeded by: New parliament
- Constituency: Kowloon Central

Personal details
- Born: Liu Sing-lee; October 8, 1958 (age 67) British Hong Kong
- Party: Association for Democracy and People's Livelihood
- Education: Chinese University of Hong Kong
- Occupation: Solicitor

Bruce Liu Sing-lee (born 8 October 1958 in Hong Kong) is a Hong Kong solicitor and politician. He is the former chairman of the moderate Association for Democracy and People's Livelihood and an elected member of Kowloon City District Council (2008–2011) representing the Kai Tak constituency.

He graduated from the Department of Social Work in the Chinese University of Hong Kong in 1983. He was a member of the Wong Tai Sin District Board (1985–1999), the Legislative Council of Hong Kong (1995–1997) and the Provisional Legislative Council (1997–1998).

Political offices
New constituency	Member of Wong Tai Sin District Board; Representative for Wang Tau Hom; 1985–1994	Succeeded by Wong Yuk-fun
Preceded by David Chu	Member of Kowloon City District Council; Representative for Kai Tak; 2002–2011	Succeeded by Ronald Yeung
Preceded by Timothy Choy Tsz-kin	Member of the Wong Tai Sin District Council; Representative for Choi Wan East; 2020–present	Incumbent
Legislative Council of Hong Kong
Preceded by Lam Kui-shing	Member of Legislative Council; Representative for Kowloon Central; 1995–1997	Replaced by Provisional Legislative Council
New parliament	Member of Provisional Legislative Council; 1997–1998	Replaced by Legislative Council
Party political offices
Preceded by Frederick Fung	Chairman of the Association for Democracy and People's Livelihood; 2007–2016	Succeeded by Rosanda Mok
