= Tam Jai Noodle =

Hong Kong fast casual noodle restaurant

Tam Jai International Company Ltd.
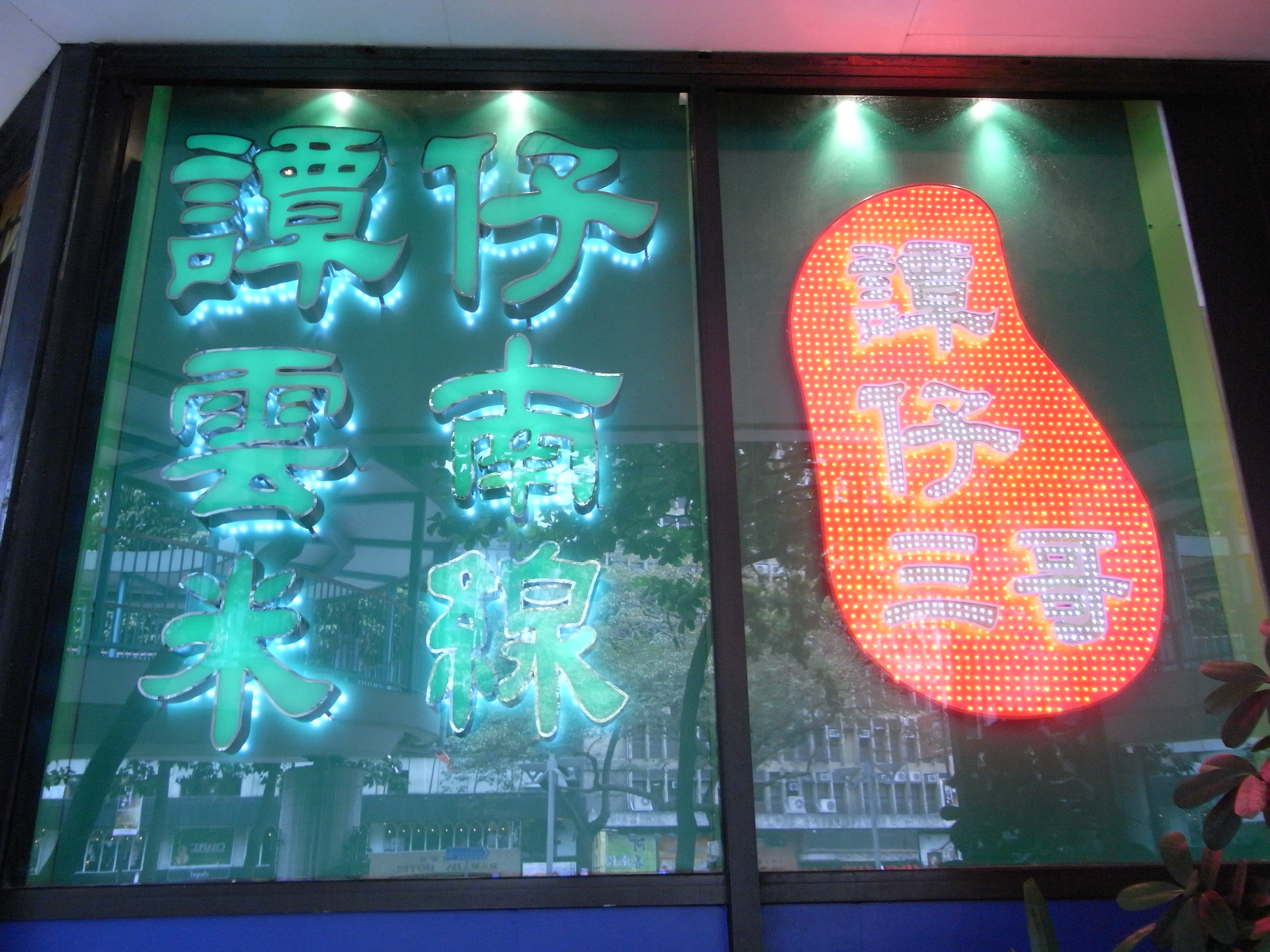
- Native name: 譚仔國際有限公司
- Traded as: SEHK: 2217
- Industry: Fast casual dining, Chinese cuisine
- Founded: 1996; 30 years ago
- Headquarters: 8/F, D2 Place ONE, 9 Cheung Yee St., Cheung Sha Wan, Hong Kong
- Area served: Hong Kong (182 locations); Singapore (3 locations); China (20 locations); Tokyo (3 locations); Singapore (3 locations); Australia (3 locations); Malaysia (1 location)
- Parent: Toridoll
- Website: tamjai-intl.com

Tam Jai International Company Ltd. (譚仔國際有限公司) is a fast casual restaurant chain based in Hong Kong. The chain specializes in Yunnan-style rice noodles, which are offered in the "cart noodle" style where patrons select their toppings according to taste. Customers can also select from various soup bases that span a range of spiciness, from mild to extremely spicy.

The company trades under the names TamJai SamGor Mixian (Chinese: 譚仔三哥米線; lit. 'Tam Jai Third Brother Noodles'), TamJai Yunnan Mixian (譚仔雲南米線; 'Tam Jai Yunnan Rice Noodles') and TamJai Mixian (譚仔香港米線). It also operates Japanese dining brands Marugame Seimen and Yakiniku Yamagyu through franchise and licensing in Hong Kong.

== History ==
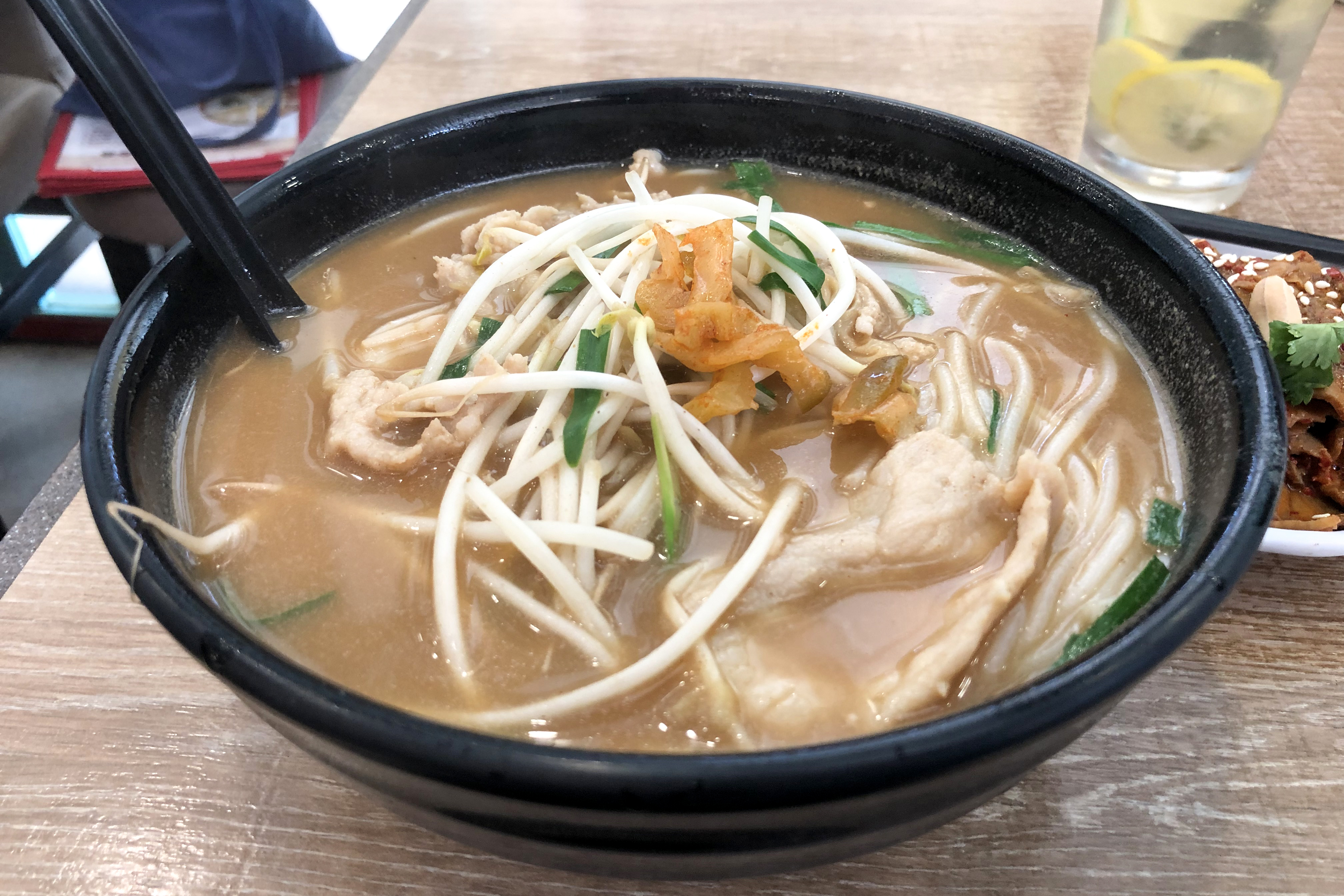
Rice Noodles with Charred Pepper Spicy Soup Base

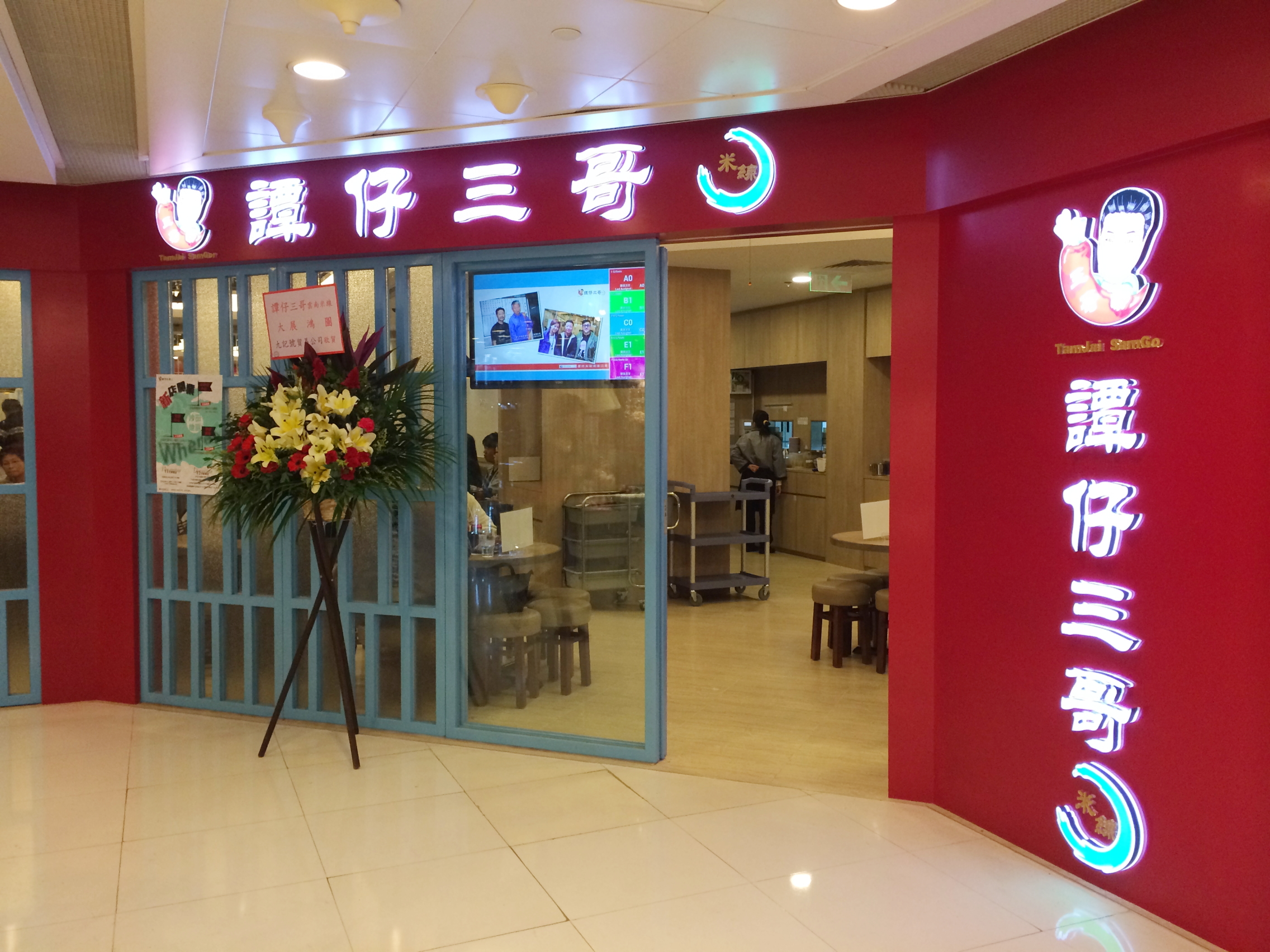
Tam Jai Sam Gor's Shatin Plaza Location

Tam Jai was founded in 1996 under the name 譚仔雲南米線 and the English name Tam's Yunnan Noodle. In 2008, following a dispute between the shareholders, the company split into two chains with similar names, TamJai SamGor and Tam Jai Yunnan Mixian.

Both brands were bought by Japanese udon noodle restaurant operator Toridoll in 2018 and consolidated under the Tam Jai International name. Tam Jai International runs both brands out of a consolidated kitchen.

Toridoll launched an initial public offering for the Tam Jai business on the Hong Kong Stock Exchange in 2021. It was delisted in August 2025 with Toridoll repurchasing the outstanding shares under a court-sanctioned scheme of arrangement.

Since then, Tam Jai expanded to operate restaurants in four cities in Southern China as well as outlets in Singapore and Japan. In November 2023, the company announced relationships with the potential to operate franchises in Australia and Philippines.

One of the founder's children, Chris Tam, was the husband of Abby Choi who was allegedly murdered in 2023.
