= Kadoorie Hill =

Residential area in Kowloon, Hong Kong

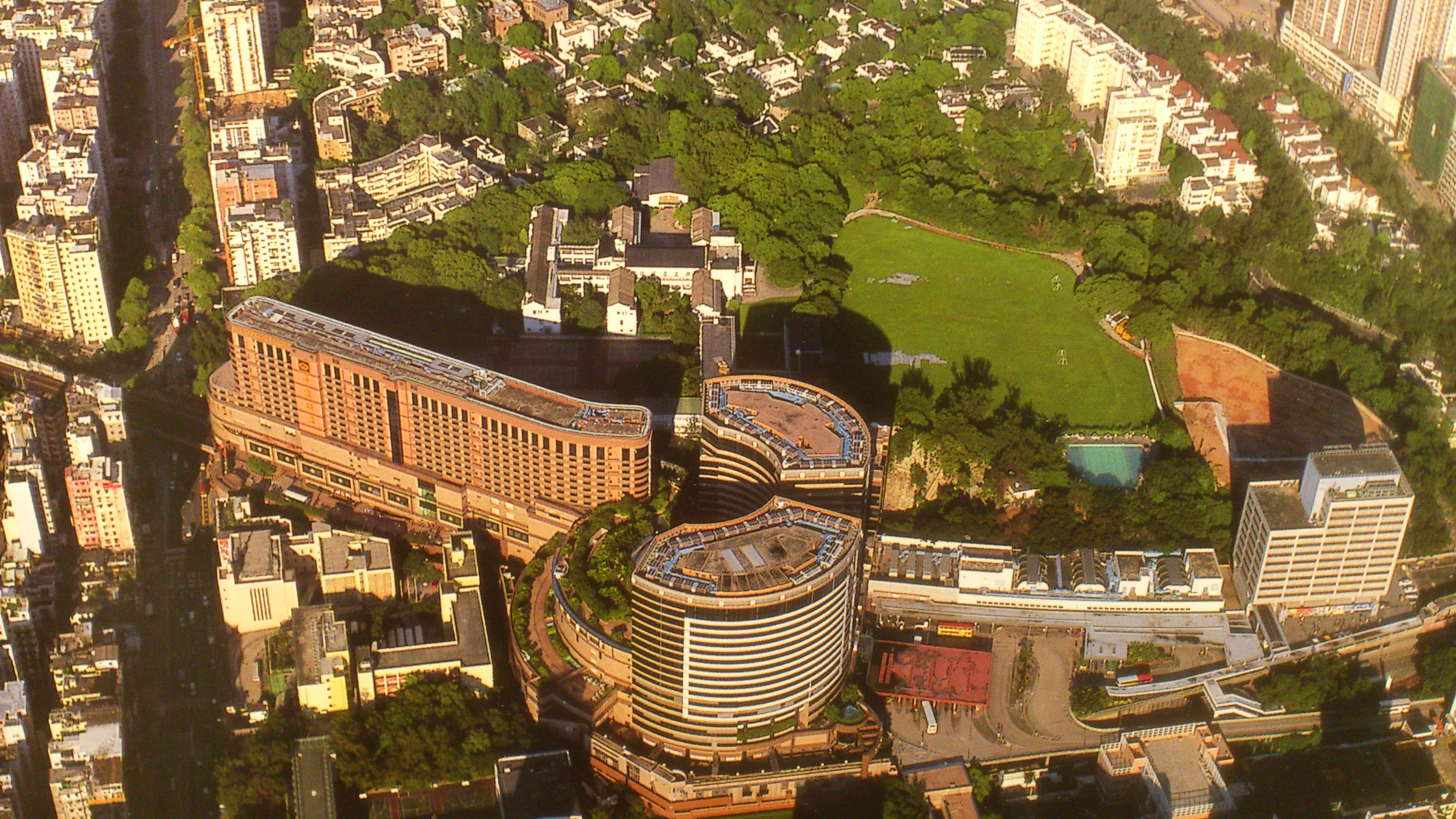
- Chinese: 加多利山
Transcriptions
Standard Mandarin
- Hanyu Pinyin: Jiāduōlì Shān
Yue: Cantonese
- Jyutping: gaa1 do1 lei6 saan1

Kadoorie Hill (Chinese: 加多利山) is an upper class residential area in Kowloon City District, Hong Kong, located south of Kowloon Tong and north of Ho Man Tin.

The majority of the development has its ownership under the Kadoorie family; in 2019 the majority of residential properties are residential properties, something Christopher DeWolf characterises as out of the ordinary for an upper class neighbourhood.

== History ==
It was built as a "garden city". It was built by the Hong Kong Engineering & Construction Co., which had been funded by the Kadoorie family as a way to generate money in case the construction business contracted. The company had been established in 1922. The company acquired the first parcels of land that would become Kadoorie Hill in 1930. The purchase had 30 acres (12 ha) of land. The land survey was done beginning in 1931. Sang Lee & Co. served as the contracting crew and had re-formed mountainous terrain.

== Education ==
Kadoorie Hill is in Primary One Admission (POA) School Net 34. Within school net 34 are multiple aided schools (operated independently but funded with government money) and the following government schools: Farm Road Government Primary School (農圃道官立小學) and Ma Tau Chung Government Primary School (馬頭涌官立小學).

A secondary school, Diocesan Boys' School (DBS), is in the Kadoorie Hill area.

== See also ==
- Kadoorie (constituency)
- Waterloo Hill (Black Rock Hill)
- Kowloon Hospital
