= Sung Wong Toi =

Historic inscribed stone in Hong Kong

Coordinates: 22.325116°N 114.189418°E

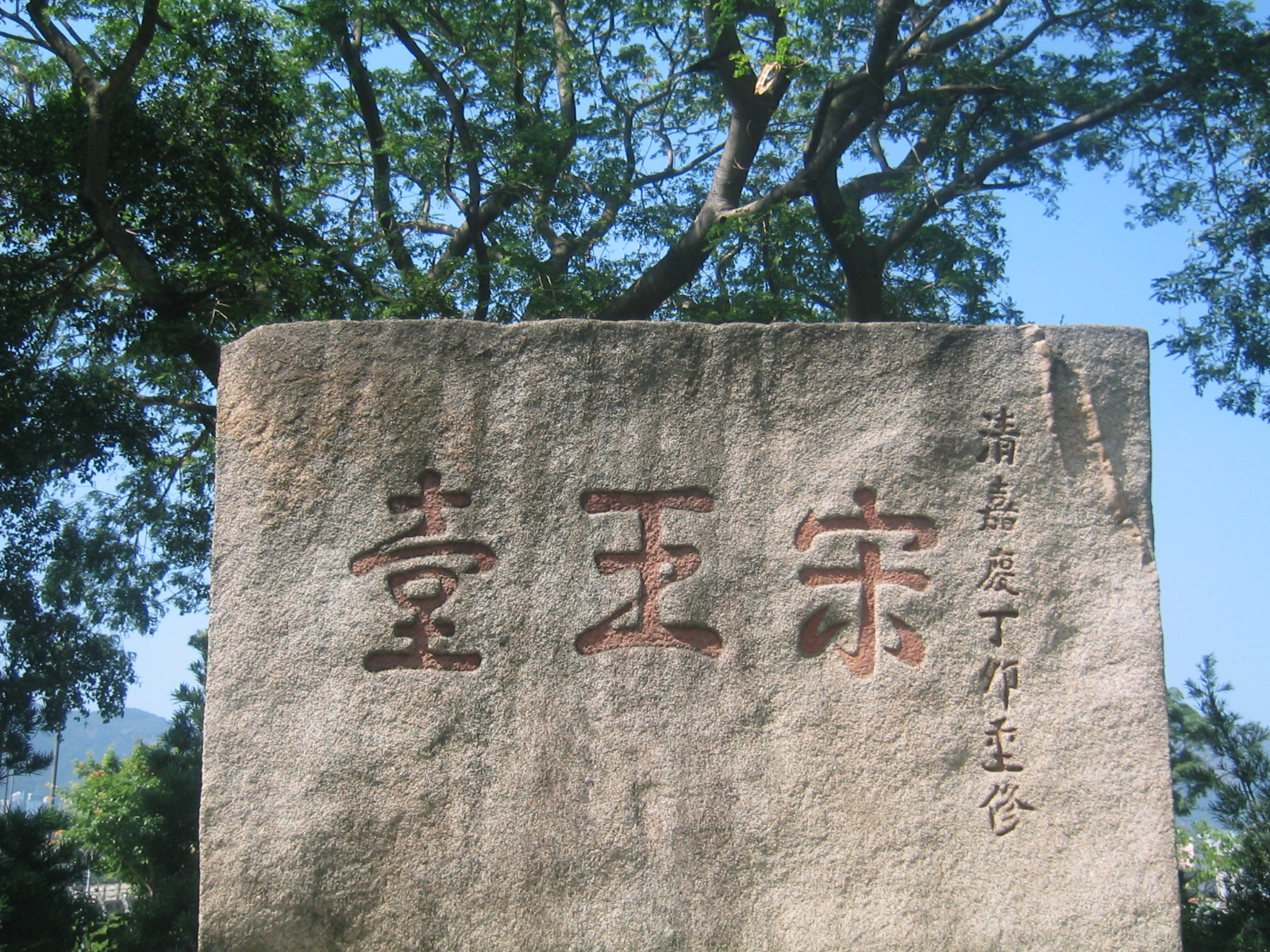
- Chinese: 宋王台
- Literal meaning: The Terrace of the Song Dynasty kings (emperors)
Transcriptions
Standard Mandarin
- Hanyu Pinyin: Sòng Wáng Tái
Yue: Cantonese
- Jyutping: Sung3 Wong4 Toi4

Sung Wong Toi is an important historic relic in Ma Tau Chung, Kowloon, Hong Kong. While its remaining portion is now located in the Sung Wong Toi Garden (宋皇台花園) at the junction of Ma Tau Chung Road and Sung Wong Toi Road, it was originally a 45-metre-tall boulder standing on the top of Sacred Hill (聖山) in Ma Tau Chung above Kowloon Bay.

== Etymology ==
The name Sung Wong Toi literally means "Song king terrace", or "Terrace of the kings of the Song dynasty". The stone is believed to have been a memorial to the last two boy emperors of the Southern Song dynasty, Zhao Shi and Zhao Bing, who temporarily lived in Hong Kong from 1277 to 1279. In historical maps and documents, Sung Wong Toi is also known as Hill of the King of the Sung and Song Wong Toi in some occasions.

== History ==
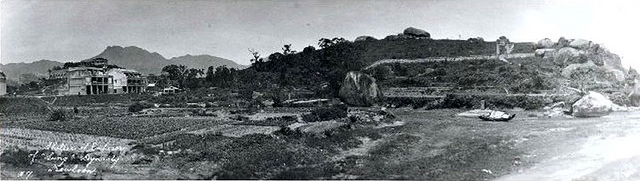
c. 1920s. The boulder bearing the three carved characters is situated on top of the hill (right); both were protected as sacred relics by a special ordinance in 1899. The gate, the steps to the inscription and the balustrade around the boulder were erected in 1915. The hill was levelled and the boulder was broken up in blasting operations to extend Kai Tak Airport.

=== Song dynasty ===
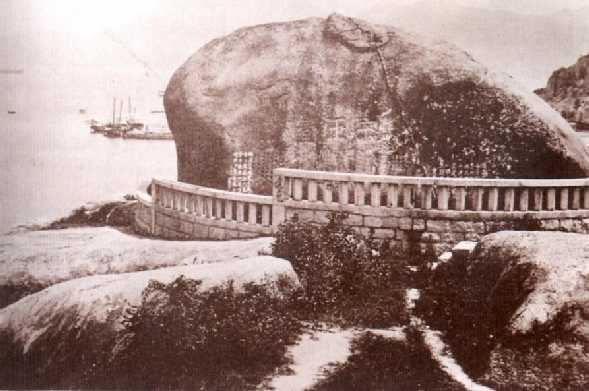
Sung Wong Toi before the Second Sino-Japanese War

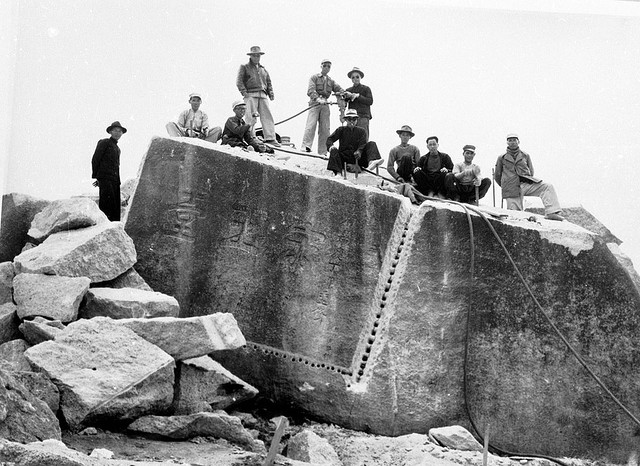
Stone carving before its separation from the original rockface (c.1950)

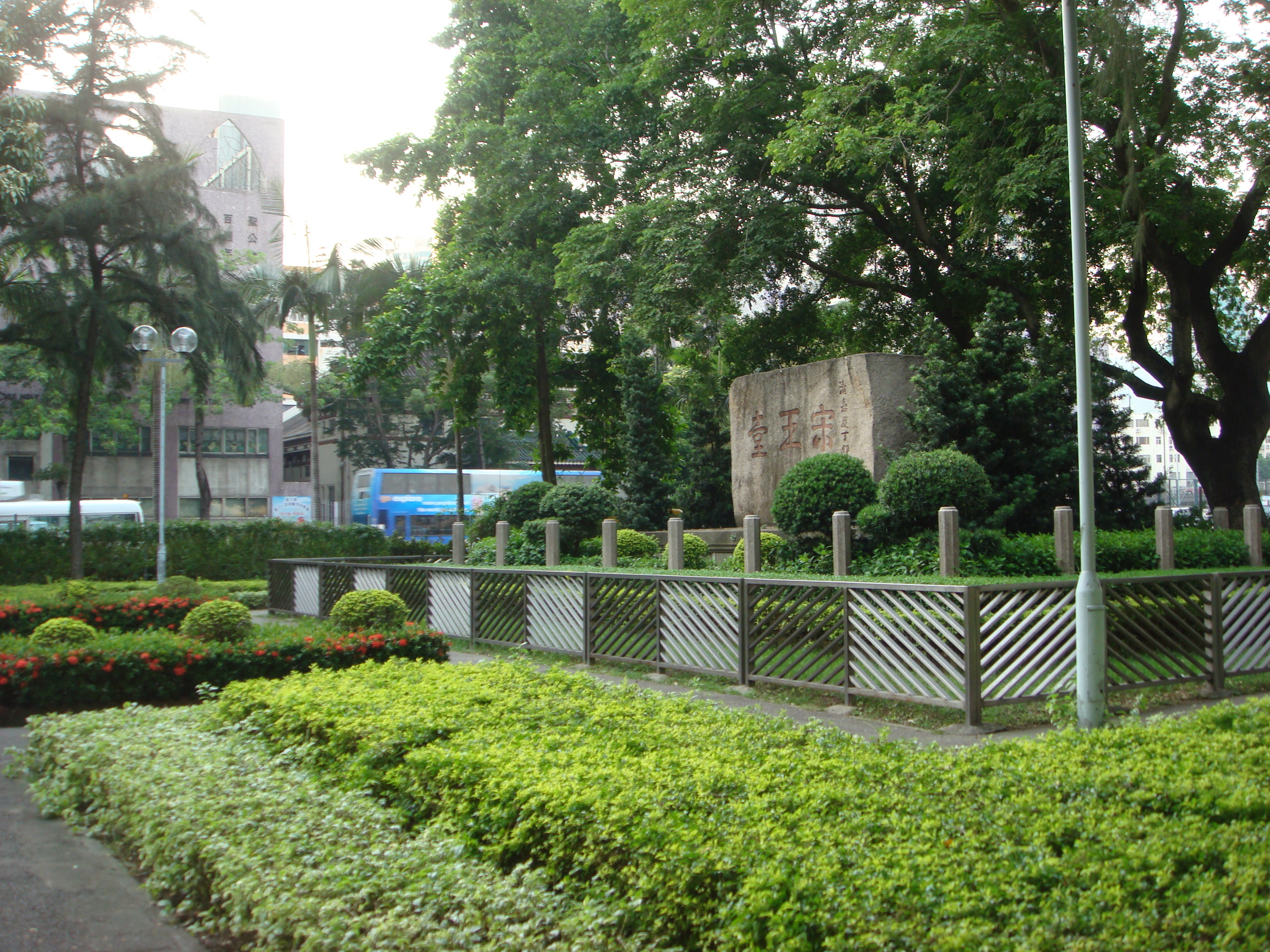
Sung Wong Toi Garden in 2009

According to historical records, when the child emperors Zhao Shi and Zhao Bing of the Song dynasty were fleeing south when the Song Empire was gradually being conquered by the Yuan dynasty in the late 13th century, they took refuge at the Sacred Hill along the seashore. Zhao Shi died of illness in Hong Kong, while Zhao Bing died when the Song loyalist Lu Xiufu put him on his shoulders and jumped off a cliff following the defeat of Song by the Yuan at the naval Battle of Yamen.

=== Yuan dynasty ===
After the Song dynasty was overthrown by the Yuan dynasty in 1279, local residents inscribed the words "Sung Wong Toi" on this large rock that was on the Sacred Hill at that time.

Note that the Chinese character for "king" (王) is carved in the stone instead of the conventional "emperor" (皇). Both characters are pronounced as "Wong" in Cantonese. This may have been done by the locals to avoid angering the Yuan emperors. The colonial government in 1959 recognized the nature of this intentional word choice, preferred using the character for "emperor" (皇) to name the surrounding locations associated with Sung Wong Toi, namely the park built for settling the trimmed monolith, the nearby road and the metro station.

=== Qing dynasty ===
In 1807, seven smaller characters were added on the right side of the stone to record the renovation work during the reign of the Jiaqing Emperor.

=== Japanese occupation ===
During the Japanese occupation of Hong Kong in 1941–1945, the boulder was dislodged from its place when the Sacred Hill was levelled for an extension of the Kai Tak Airport. A portion of the rock inscribed with Chinese characters survived the blasting operation. That part of the boulder, about one-third of its original size, displays the Chinese name of the stone, "Sung Wong Toi".

=== Post-World War II ===
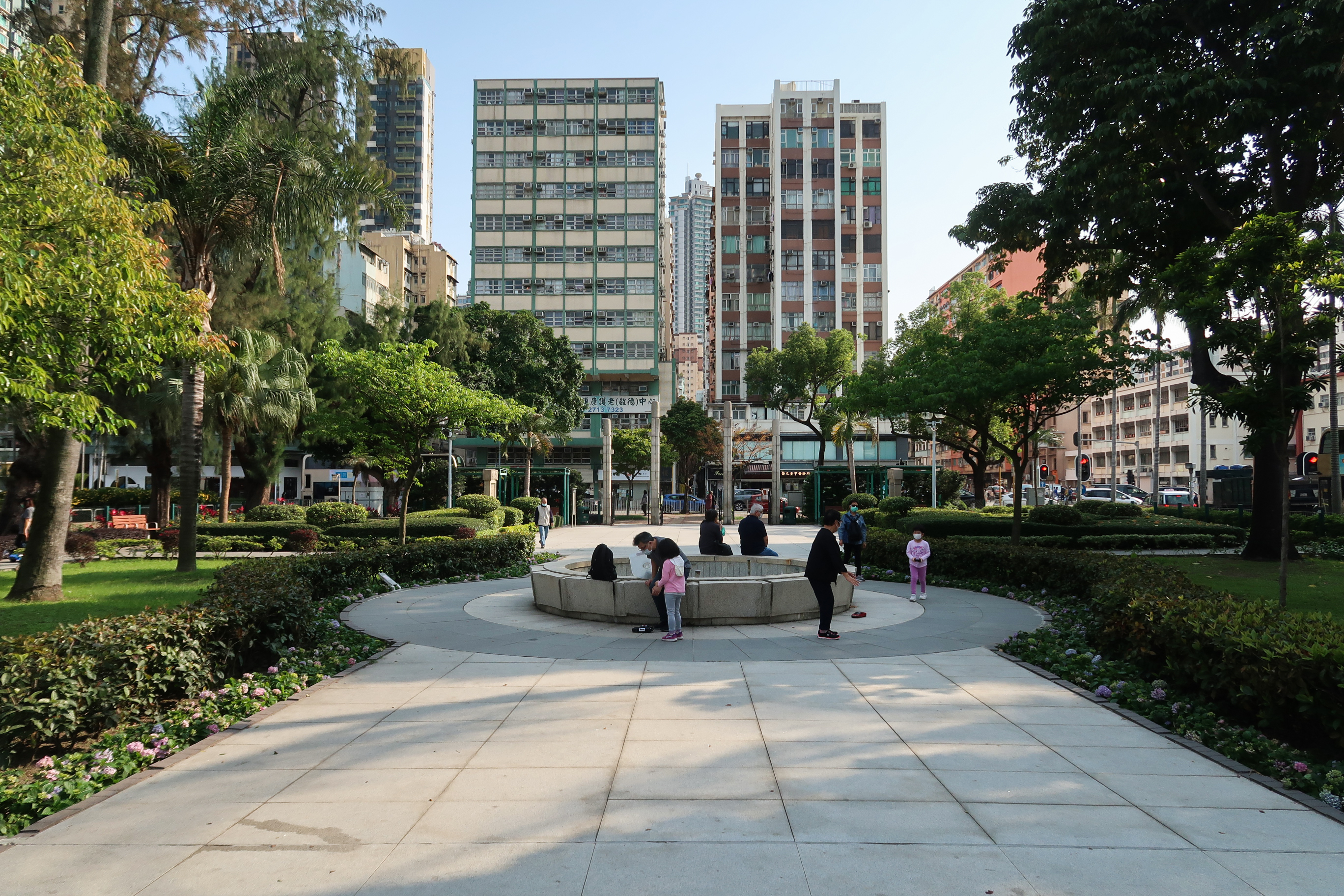
Sung Wong Toi Garden in 2020.

After World War II, this portion of the stone was shaped into a rectangular block and moved to the Sung Wong Toi Garden, a small park especially constructed for it. This park is located in the present-day Kowloon City District, at the junction of Sung Wong Toi Road and Ma Tau Chung Road, which is close to the stone's original site. The construction work of the park was completed in the winter of 1945.

The park was planned be relocated to nearby Kai Tak Development as Sung Wong Toi Park.

== See also ==
- List of urban public parks and gardens of Hong Kong
- List of buildings and structures in Hong Kong
- History of Hong Kong
- Sung Wong Toi station
- Emperor Duanzong
- Zhao Bing
