= Wong Siu-yee =

Wong Siu-yee 王紹爾 BBS, JP

Member of the Provisional Legislative Council
- In office 21 December 1996 – 30 June 1998

Personal details
- Born: 4 July 1953 (age 73) British Hong Kong
- Party: Liberal Democratic Federation (1990s–97); Progressive Alliance (1997–2005); Democratic Alliance for the Betterment and Progress of Hong Kong (2005–09)
- Children: 2 daughters
- Occupation: Merchant

Wong Siu-yee, BBS, JP (born 4 July 1953, Hong Kong) was the member of the Provisional Legislative Council and the Kowloon City District Board member (1985–2003) and Urban Council (1991–94). He was also elected as member of the Election Committee in 2000 and 2006 respectively, which is an electoral college responsible for electing the Chief Executive of Hong Kong.

Legislative Council of Hong Kong
New parliament	Member of Provisional Legislative Council; 1997–1998	Replaced by Legislative Council
Preceded by Allen Lee	Senior Member in Provisional Legislative Council; 1997–1998	Succeeded by Kenneth Ting
