= Kowloon Central (2021 constituency) =

Geographical constituency in Hong Kong

- Geographical constituency for the Legislative Council of Hong Kong
- District: Kowloon City District; North-western part of Wong Tai Sin District
- Region: Kowloon
- Population: 778,900
- Electorate: 454,595

Current constituency
- Created: 2021
- Number of members: Two
- Members: Starry Lee (DAB); Kitson Yang (Nonpartisan)
- Created from: Kowloon East (1998); Kowloon West (1998)

The Kowloon Central geographical constituency is one of the ten geographical constituencies in the elections for the Legislative Council of Hong Kong which elects two members of the Legislative Council using the single non-transferable vote (SNTV) system. The constituency covers Kowloon City District and most of Wong Tai Sin District in Kowloon.

== History ==
The constituency was created under the overhaul of the electoral system imposed by the Beijing government in 2021, replacing the Kowloon City part of the Kowloon West constituency and north-western part of Wong Tai Sin District (all District Council constituencies except covered by Kowloon East) of the Kowloon East constituency used from 1998 to 2021. Constituencies with the same name were also created for the 1991 and 1995 elections in the late colonial period, with different boundaries compared with the 2021 constituency, while the 1991 constituency also elected two seats with each voter having two votes and the same boundary.

== Returning members ==
Election	Member	Party	Member	Party
2021	Starry Lee	DAB	Kitson Yang	Nonpartisan
2025	Starry Lee	DAB	Kitson Yang	Nonpartisan

== Election results ==
=== 2020s ===
2025 Legislative Council election: Kowloon Central
Party	Candidate	Votes	%	±%
DAB	Starry Lee Wai-king	53,529	41.16	−27.54
FTU	Yau Yiu-shing	12,527	9.63	+9.63
BPA	Lee Chiu-yu	7,615	5.86	+5.86
Nonpartisan	Kitson Yang Wing-kit	28,163	21.65	−3.91
Nonpartisan	Yeung Nok-hin	15,734	12.10	+12.10
Nonpartisan	Tam Lee-yee	12,487	9.60	+9.60
Total valid votes		130,055		
Rejected ballots				
Turnout				
Registered electors		422,161		
DAB hold		Swing		
Independent hold		Swing		

Vote share
1. DAB (68.7%)
2. Nonpartisan (31.3%)

2021 Legislative Council election: Kowloon Central
Party	Candidate	Votes	%	±%
DAB	Starry Lee Wai-king	95,976	68.70	
Nonpartisan	Kitson Yang Wing-kit	35,702	25.56	
Nonpartisan	Mandy Tam Heung-man	8,028	5.75	
Total valid votes		139,706	100.00	
Rejected ballots		2,961		
Turnout		142,667	31.38	
Registered electors		454,595		
DAB win (new seat)				
Nonpartisan win (new seat)				
