= Kowloon City District =

District in Hong Kong

Kowloon City 九龍城區
- District
- Kowloon City District
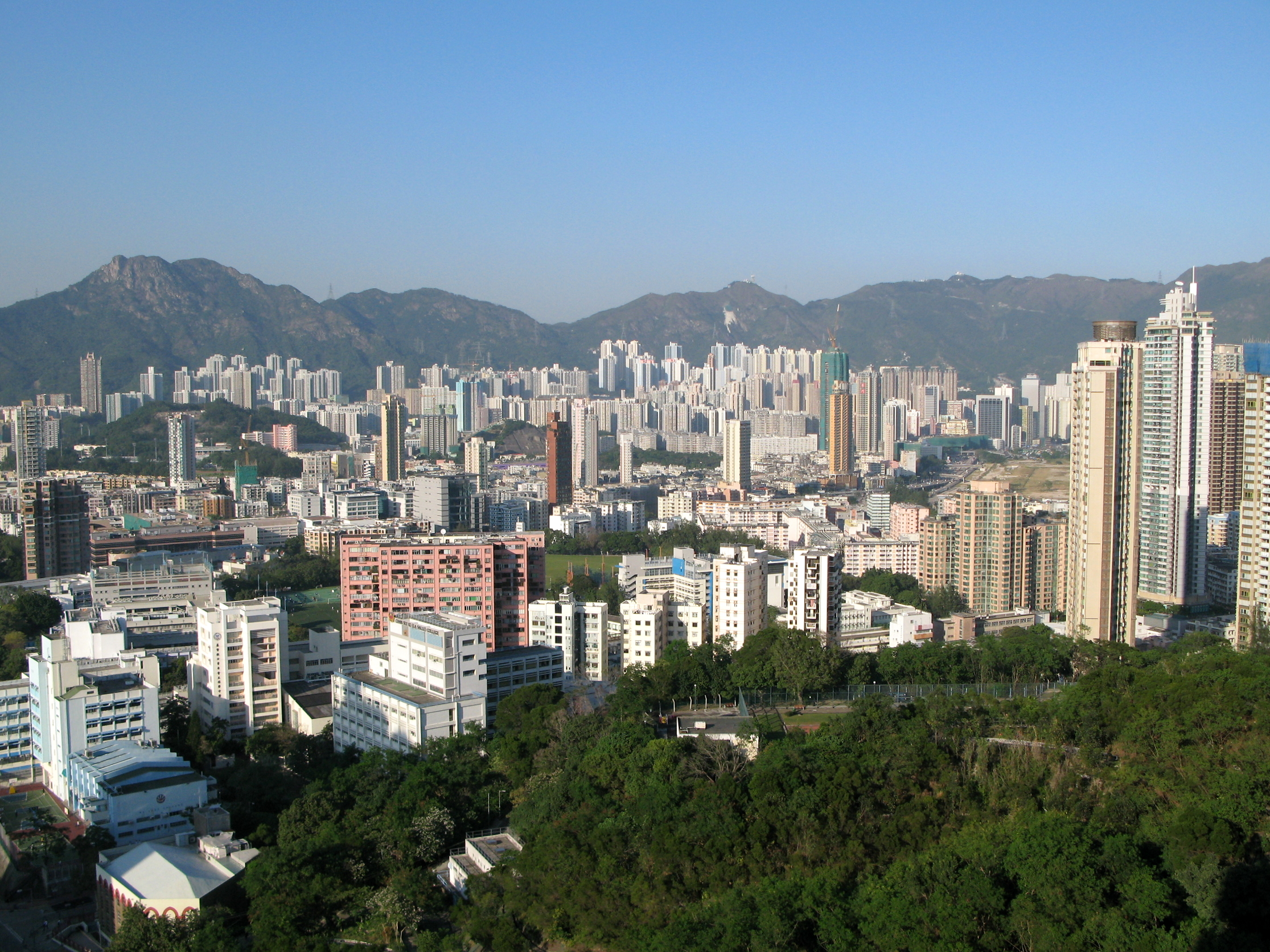
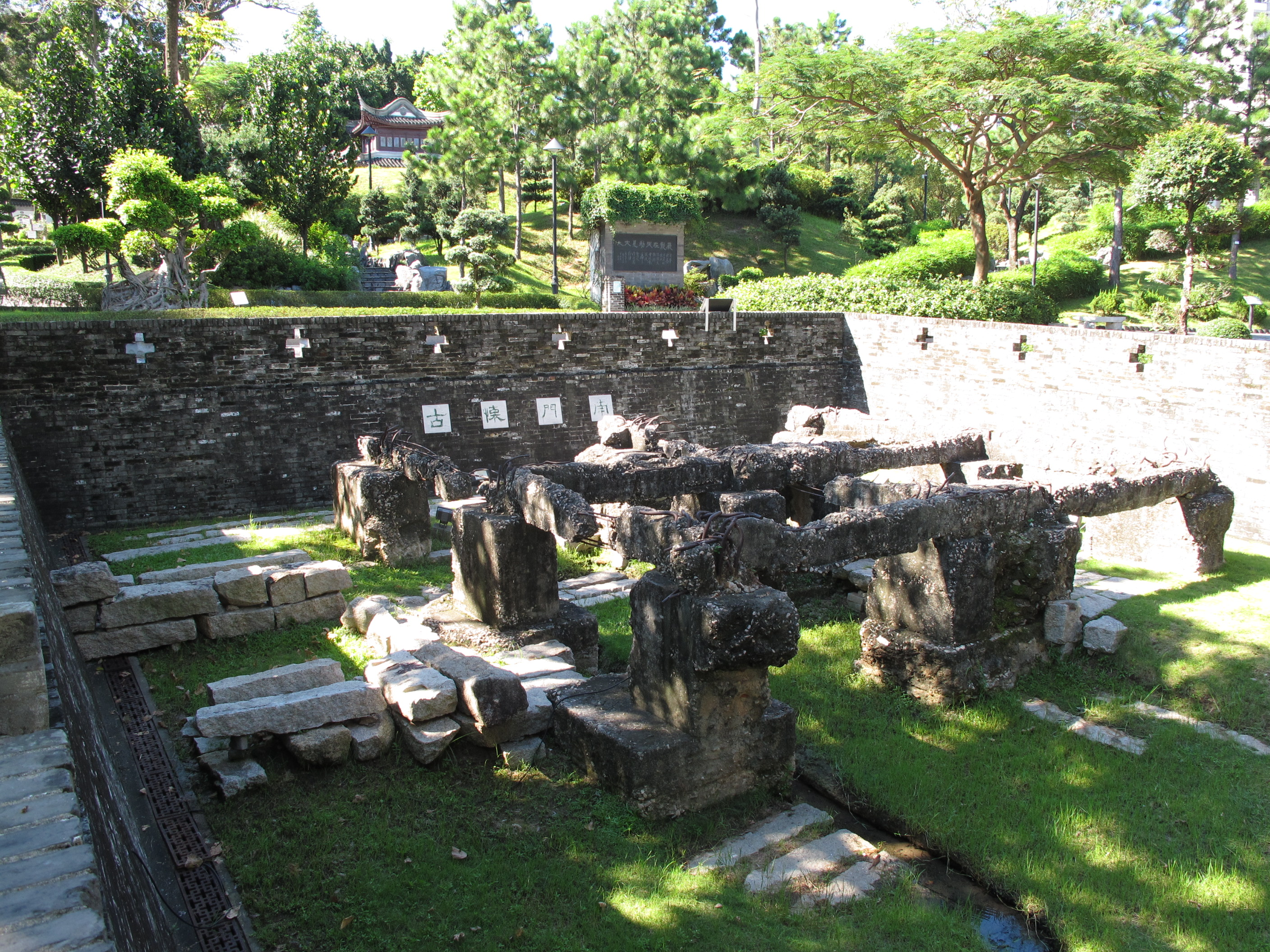
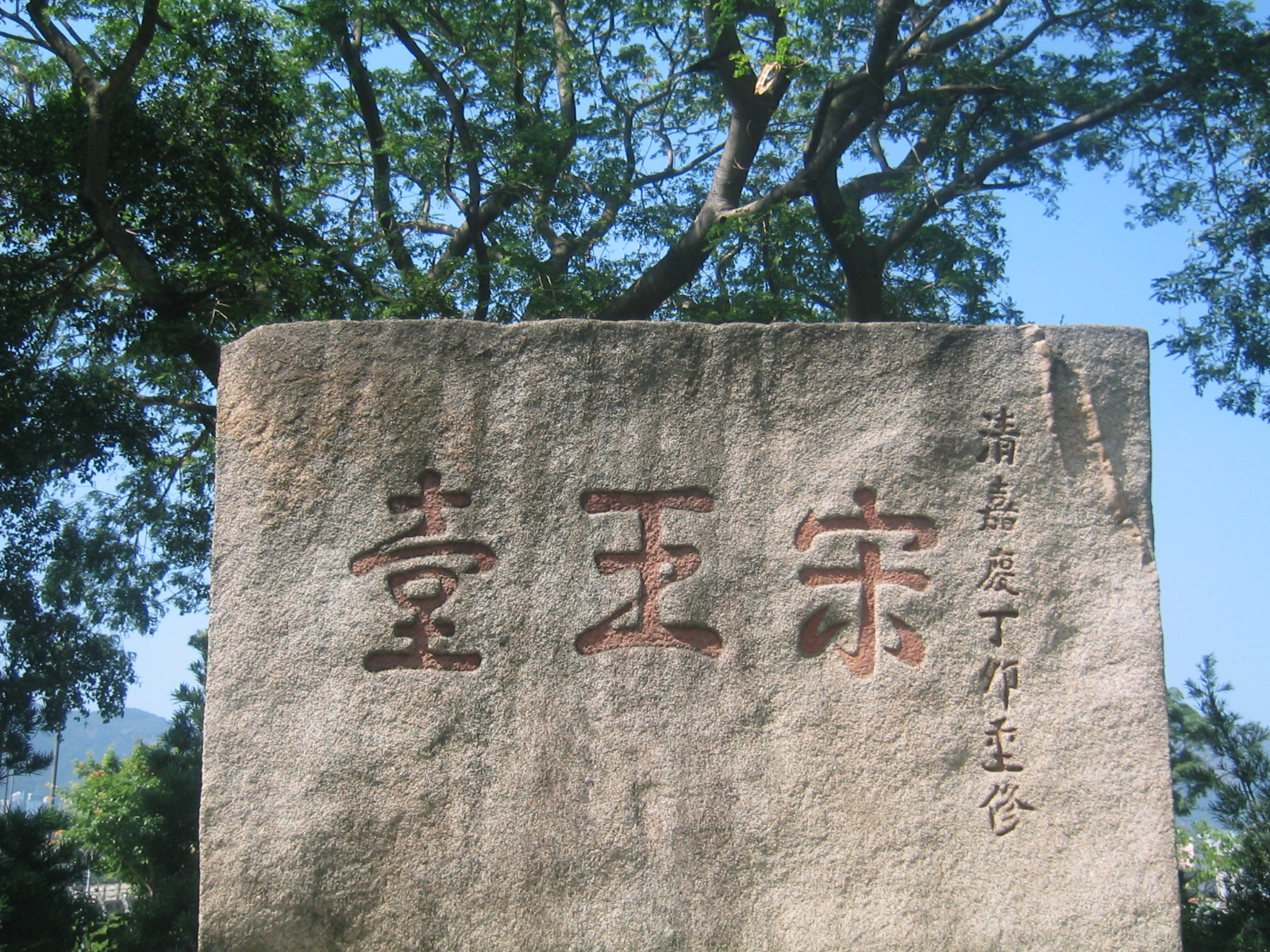
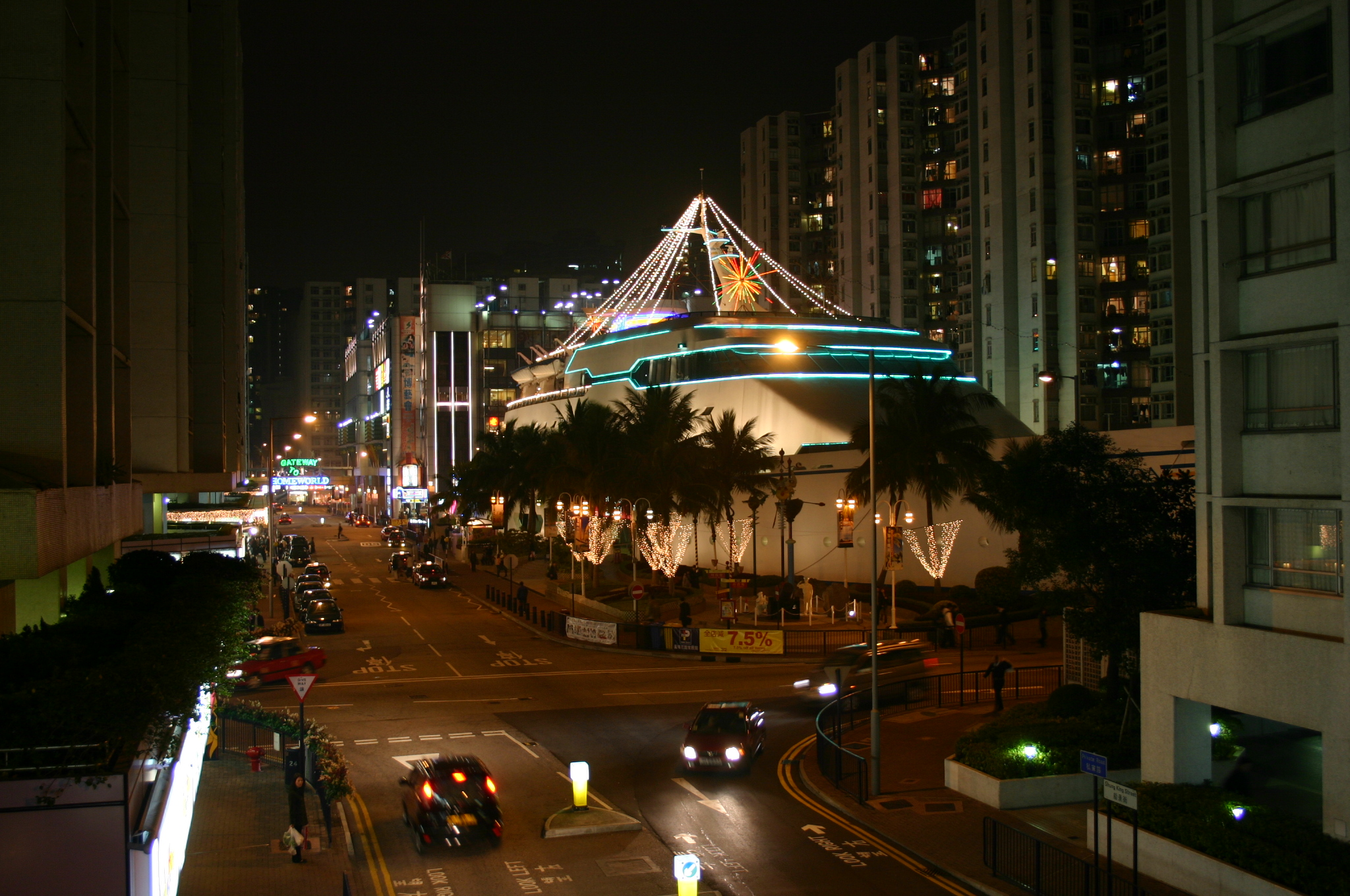
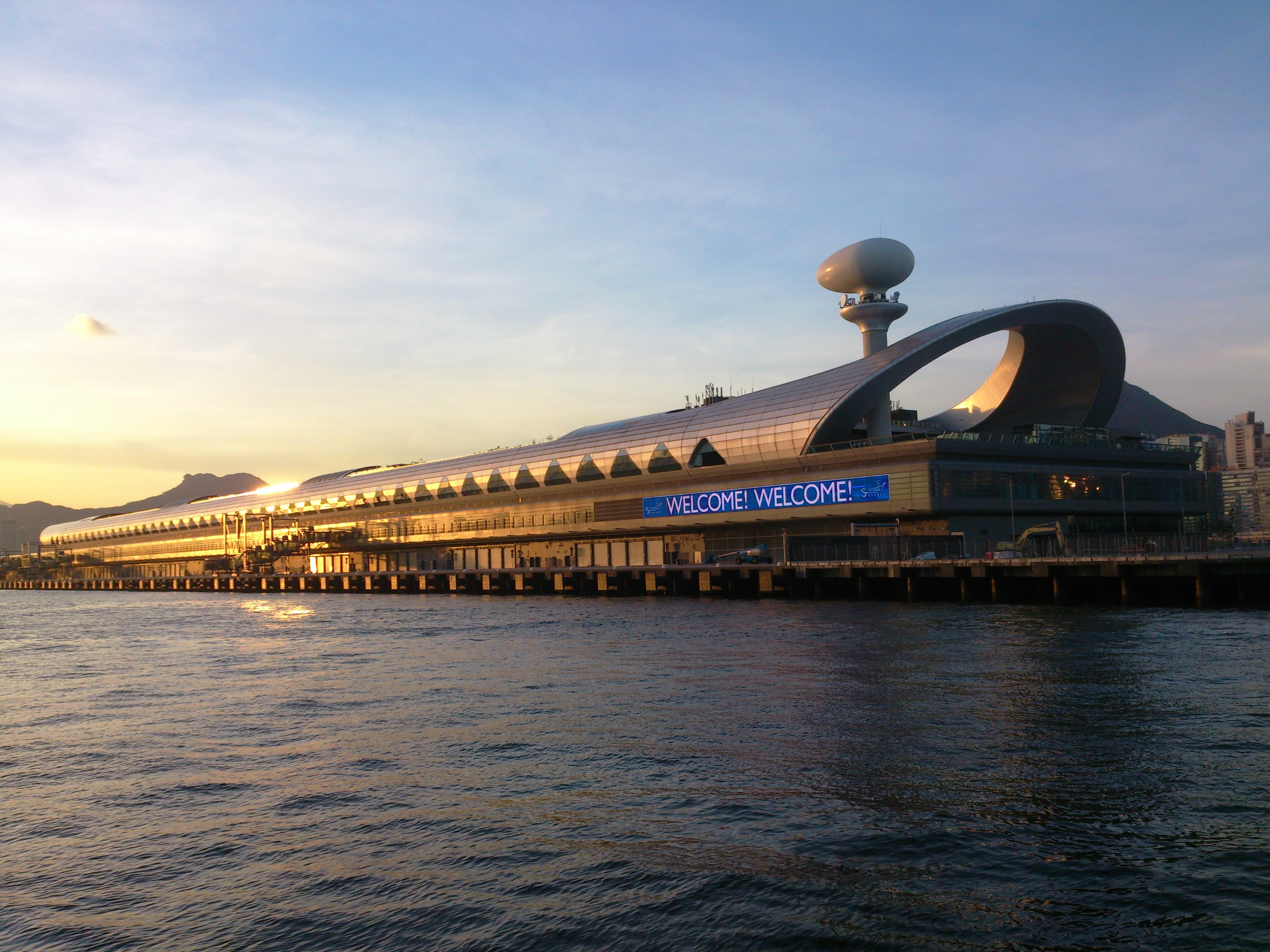
- Aerial view of Kowloon City Kowloon Walled City Park Sung Wong Toi Whampoa Garden Kai Tak Cruise Terminal

- Location of Kowloon City District within Hong Kong
- Interactive map of Kowloon City
- Coordinates: 22°19′42″N 114°11′30″E
- Country: China
- SAR: Hong Kong
- Constituencies: 25

Government
  - District Officer: Tso Man Kwan
  - District Council Chairman: Ho Hin-ming
  - District Council Vice-Chairman: Ng Po-Keung

Area
  - Total: 9.97 km^{2} (3.85 sq mi)

Population (2016)
  - Total: 418,732
  - Density: 42,000/km^{2} (109,000/sq mi)
- Time zone: UTC+8 (Hong Kong Time)
- Largest neighbourhood by population: Ma Tau Kok (53,800 – 2016 est)
- Website: Kowloon City District Council

Kowloon City District
- Traditional Chinese: 九龍城區
- Simplified Chinese: 九龙城区
- Cantonese Yale: Gáulùhng Sìhng Kēui
Transcriptions
Standard Mandarin
- Hanyu Pinyin: Jiǔlóng chéng qū
- Wade–Giles: Chiulung ch'eng ch'ü
- IPA: [tɕjòʊlʊ̌ŋ ʈʂʰə̌ŋtɕʰý]
Wu
- Wugniu: cieu^{3} lon^{2} zen^{2} chiu^{1}
- IPA: Shanghainese: [tɕiɤ˧ loŋ˦ zən˧ tɕʰy˨]
Yue: Cantonese
- Yale Romanization: Gáulùhng Sìhng Kēui
- Jyutping: gau^{2} lung^{4} sing^{4} keoi^{1}
- IPA: [kɐ̌ulʊ̏ŋ sȉːŋkʰɵ̂y]

Kowloon City District is one of the 18 districts of Hong Kong. It is located in the city of Kowloon and cut through by Boundary Street. It had a population of 381,352 in 2001, and increased to 418,732 in 2016. The district has the third most educated residents while its residents enjoy the highest income in Kowloon. It borders all the other districts in Kowloon, with Kwun Tong district to the east, Wong Tai Sin district to its northeast, Sham Shui Po district to its northwest, and Yau Tsim Mong district to its southwest.

Kowloon City district covers about 1,000 hectares, and is mainly a residential area; most of its people live in private sector housing, including old tenement buildings, private residential developments and low-rise villas; the rest of them mainly live in public rental housing and the Home Ownership Scheme estates. It is the only district that incorporated into the land of Hong Kong in different stages (Convention of Peking, Convention for the Extension of Hong Kong Territory and the demolition of the Kowloon Walled City).

The district includes many notable areas of Kowloon, such as Ho Man Tin, Hung Hom, Kai Tak Airport, Kowloon Tong, Ma Tau Wai, To Kwa Wan, and Whampoa Garden, and the proper Kowloon City, from where it derives its namesake.

== History ==
According to reliable historical records such as the History book of Song Dynasty (宋史), emperor Emperor Duanzong (Zhao Shi) and emperor Zhao Bing took refuge in nowadays Kowloon City District. Sung Wong Toi was a remarkable monument during that era.

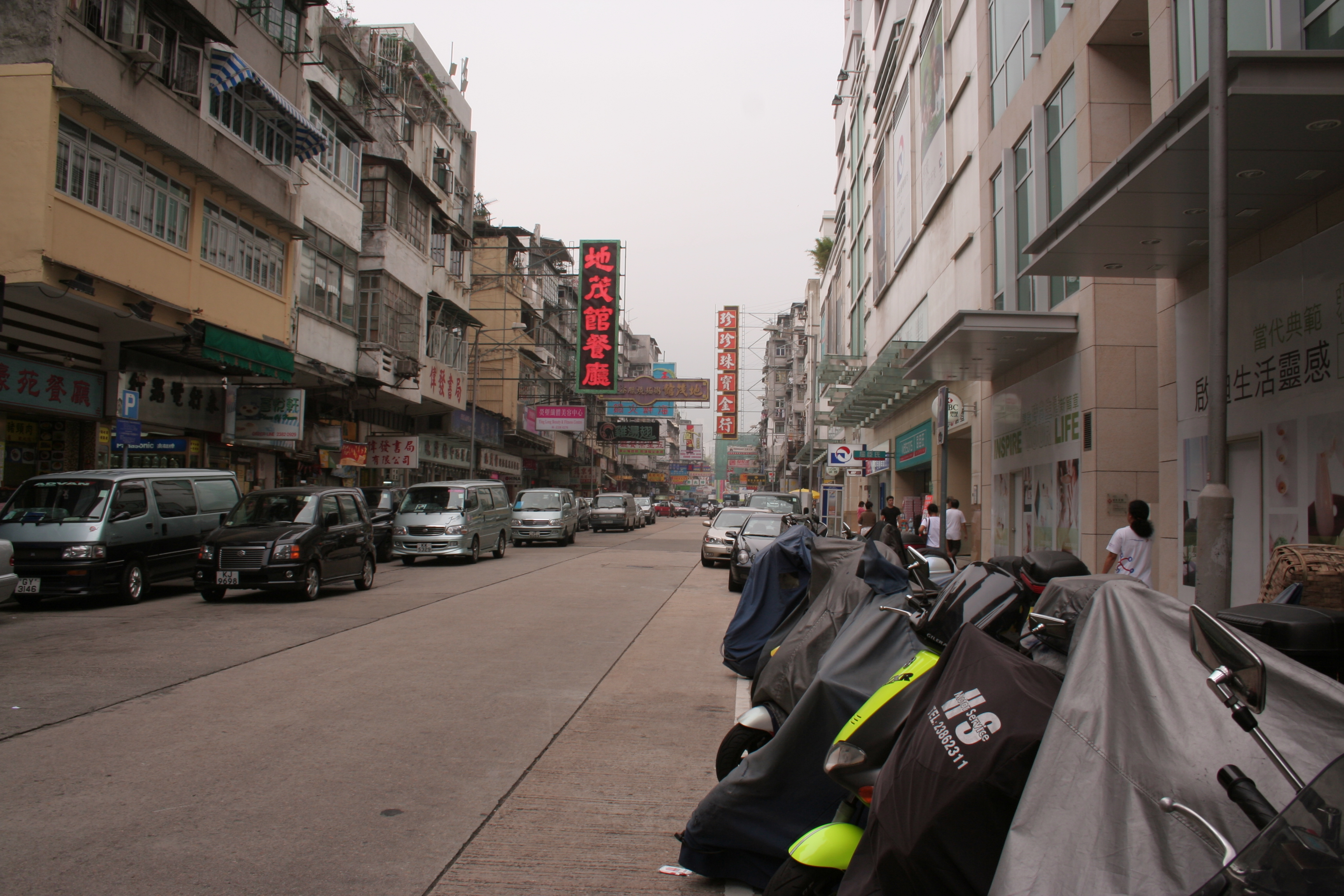
A section of Fuk Lo Tsun Road, Kowloon City

Part of the district was the location of the original Kowloon Walled City. This is now Walled City Park.

The former airport, Kai Tak International Airport was also located in the district; part of it will be re-developed to be Kai Tak Cruise Terminal. In 1982, the Hong Kong Government decided to divide Hong Kong into 18 administrative districts, and Kowloon City and its neighbouring areas such as Hung Hom now belongs to Kowloon City District.

== Areas ==
- Ho Man Tin
- Hung Hom
- Kadoorie Hill
- Kai Tak
- Kowloon City
- Kowloon Tong
- To Kwa Wan
- Whampoa
- Ma Tau Wai
- Kowloon Bay
- San Po Kong

== Sights ==
- Kowloon Walled City Park
- Sung Wong Toi Park
- Holy Trinity Cathedral

== Education ==
Universities

- Hong Kong Baptist University (Kowloon Tong main campus)
- Hong Kong Metropolitan University (Ho Man Tin main campus)
- The Hong Kong Polytechnic University (Hung Hom main campus)

Hong Kong Public Library maintains the Kowloon Public Library in the district. It also operates the Hung Hom, Kowloon City, and To Kwa Wan libraries.

== See also ==
- List of places in Hong Kong
