= Sung Wong Toi station =

MTR station in Kowloon, Hong Kong

Sung Wong Toi 宋皇臺
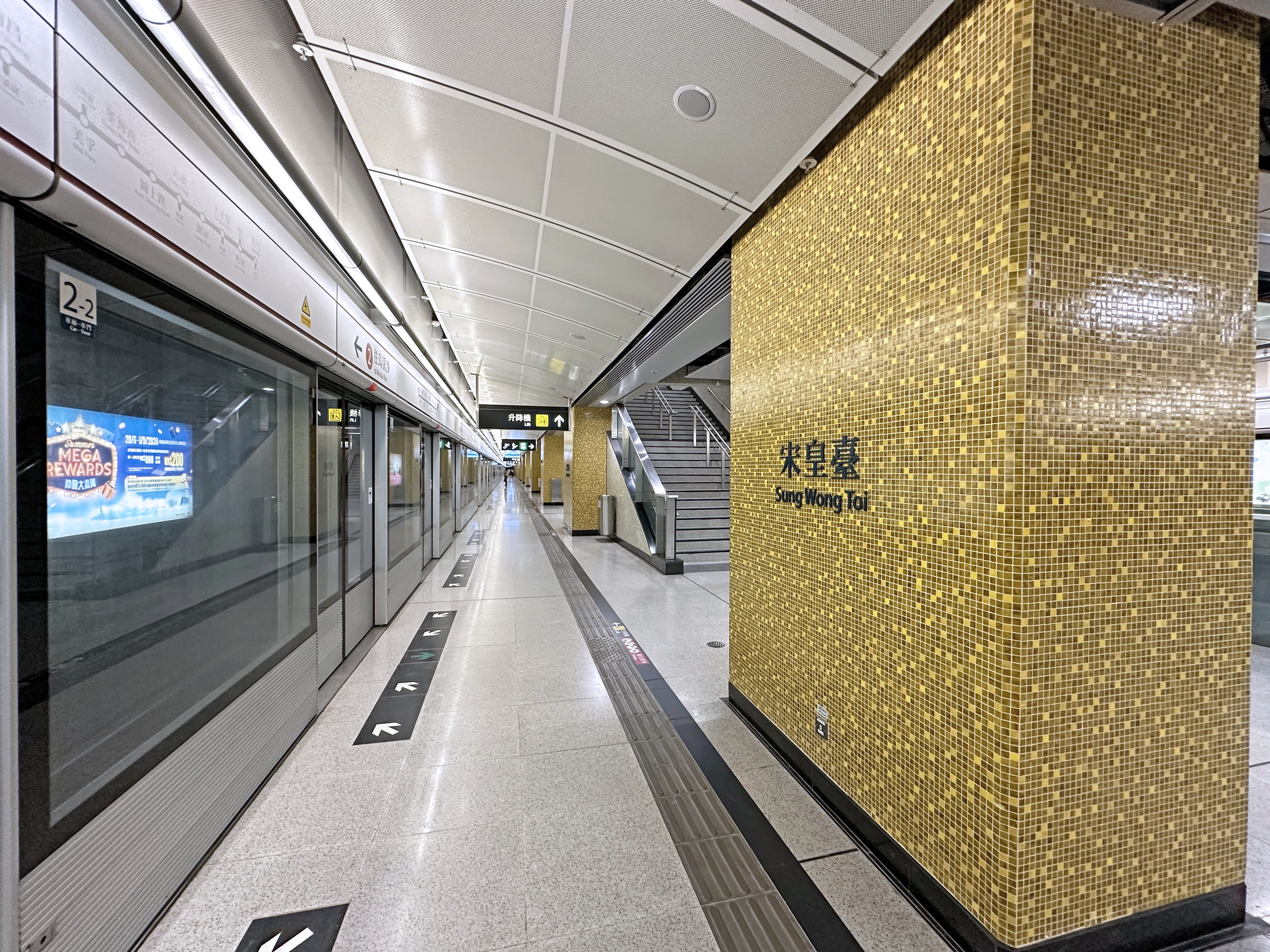
- Platform 2

Chinese name
- Traditional Chinese: 宋皇臺
- Simplified Chinese: 宋皇台
Transcriptions
Standard Mandarin
- Hanyu Pinyin: Sònghuángtái
Yue: Cantonese
- Jyutping: sung^{3}wong^{4}toi^{4}

General information
- Location: Olympic Avenue, Ma Tau Chung; Kowloon City District, Hong Kong
- Coordinates: 22°19′33″N 114°11′29″E
- System: MTR rapid transit station
- Owner: MTR Corporation
- Operator: MTR Corporation
- Line: Tuen Ma line
- Platforms: 2 (1 island platform)
- Tracks: 2

Construction
- Structure type: Underground

Other information
- Station code: SUW

History
- Opened: 27 June 2021; 5 years ago
- Former names: To Kwa Wan, Ma Tau Wai

Services
| Preceding station | MTR | Following station |
|---|---|---|
| To Kwa Wan towards Tuen Mun | Tuen Ma line | Kai Tak towards Wu Kai Sha |
Route map
Location
- Location within MTR Location within Hong Kong urban core

Sung Wong Toi is an underground MTR rapid transit station in Hong Kong on the Tuen Ma line, located in Ma Tau Chung in Kowloon City District. The station also serves Kowloon City and Ma Tau Wai via a pedestrian tunnel. The station was built as part of the Sha Tin to Central Link (SCL), and opened on 27 June 2021 along with the rest of phase 2 of the Tuen Ma line (Kai Tak to Hung Hom). The station was constructed by a Samsung–Hsin Chong joint venture. The station's livery is gold and indigo.

== Location ==
The original KCR plans had the station near the intersection of Sung Wong Toi Road and To Kwa Wan Road in the old Kai Tak Airport tarmac, but the location was moved nearer to the junction of to leave wan and Sung Wong Toi Road. The location will be roughly at the western end of the former Kai Tak Airport terminal footprint and the start of runway 13/31, which today has become the western part of the Kai Tak Development area.

=== Naming ===
This station is located geographically closer to Ma Tau Chung than To Kwa Wan. During the planning and construction phases, "To Kwa Wan" was originally chosen for this station and "Ma Tau Wai" for the adjacent station, which is in To Kwa Wan.

In a proposed network map announced by the MTR to the public on September 23, 2017, the station's name was updated to that of the nearby landmark, Sung Wong Toi, a significant historical site from the Song dynasty era of Emperor Duanzong. On November 27, 2017, the Transport and Housing Bureau confirmed that the names of both stations had been finalized. These names were chosen to address public feedback on geographical accuracy, the historical importance of the monument, and the blending of railway structures with the local community.

== Archaeological discovery ==
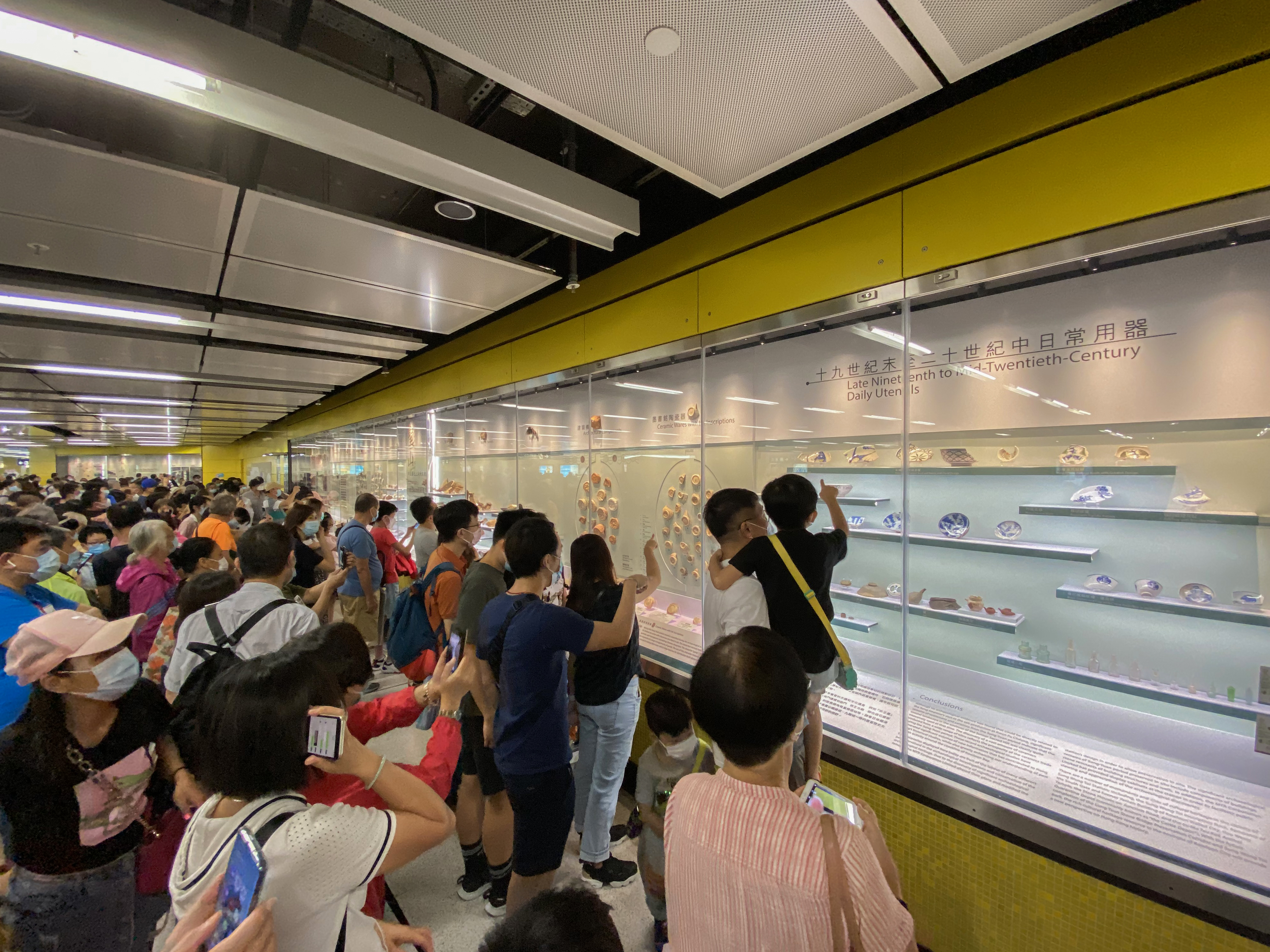
Display of archaeological relics in this station concourse attracted a large crowd on 27 June 2021, the inauguration day of Tuen Ma line full operation.

On April 21, 2014, construction workers discovered six wells and a trove of artifacts dating back to the Song dynasty. Construction was postponed for several months as archaeological evaluations were carried out. The unexpected discovery resulted in an 11-month delay and an additional cost of 3 billion Hong Kong dollars for the project. The government intends to conserve at least one of the wells on-site and integrate it into the station's design. Out of the 700 thousand relics unearthed, approximately 400 items such as coins and ceramic wares are now on display in the station's concourse.

== Station layout ==
This station is located underground with one island platform and three exits, with a fourth under planning.

| G | Ground level | Exits |
| L1 | Subway | L2 | Concourse | Customer service, MTRshops |
| L1 | Subway | L2 | Concourse | Pedestrian tunnel under Nam Kok Road |
L3; Platforms
| L3; Platforms | Platform 1 | ← Tuen Ma line towards Tuen Mun (To Kwa Wan) |
| L3; Platforms | Island platform, doors will open on the left |
| L3; Platforms | Platform 2 | Tuen Ma line towards Wu Kai Sha (Kai Tak) → |

=== Exits ===
- A: Dakota Drive, Olympic Averve, Kai Yan Court
- B1: Argyle Street, St. Teresa's Hospital, Ma Tau Wai Estate, Chun Seen Mei Chuen
- B2: Prince Edward Road West
- B3: Kowloon City, Kowloon City Plaza, Nam Kok Road, Nga Tsin Wai Road, Lung Kong Road, South Wall Road(Thilind), Eight South Park
- C: (Opening Delayed, Under Planning)
- D: Kai Tak Sports Park, Kai Tak Studium, Kai Tak Mail, Kai Tak Youth Sports Groud, Diving Cove, JOYPOLIS SPORTS HONG KONG, Kai Tak Station Square, Kai Yuet Court, Ma Tau Chung Road, Sung Wong Toi Garden
