= Ma Tau Chung =

Area in Hong Kong

Coordinates: 22.3248°N 114.1893°E

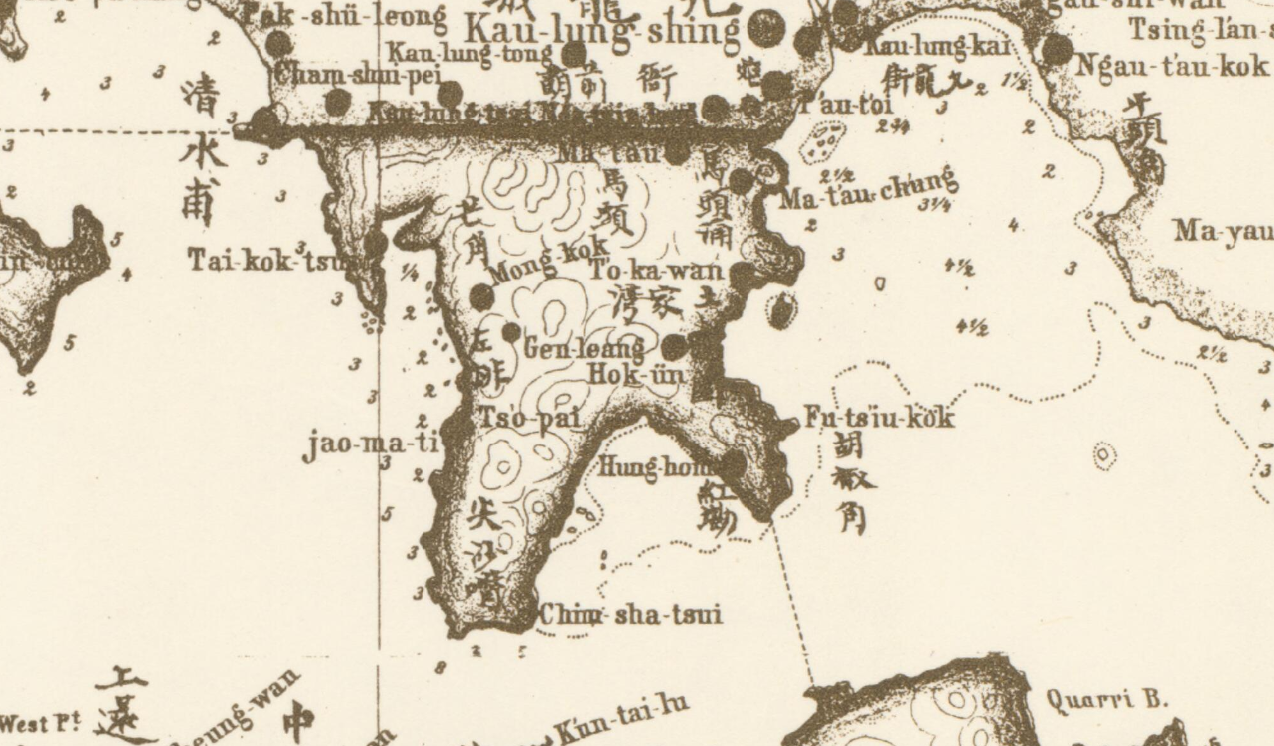
Map of Kowloon in 1866, showing the location of Ma Tau Chung at that time

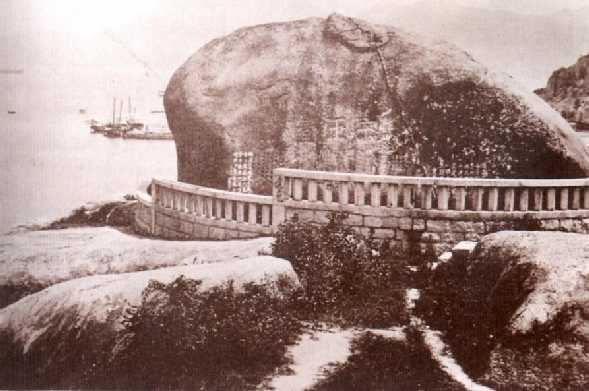
Sung Wong Toi on Sacred Hill before the Japanese occupation

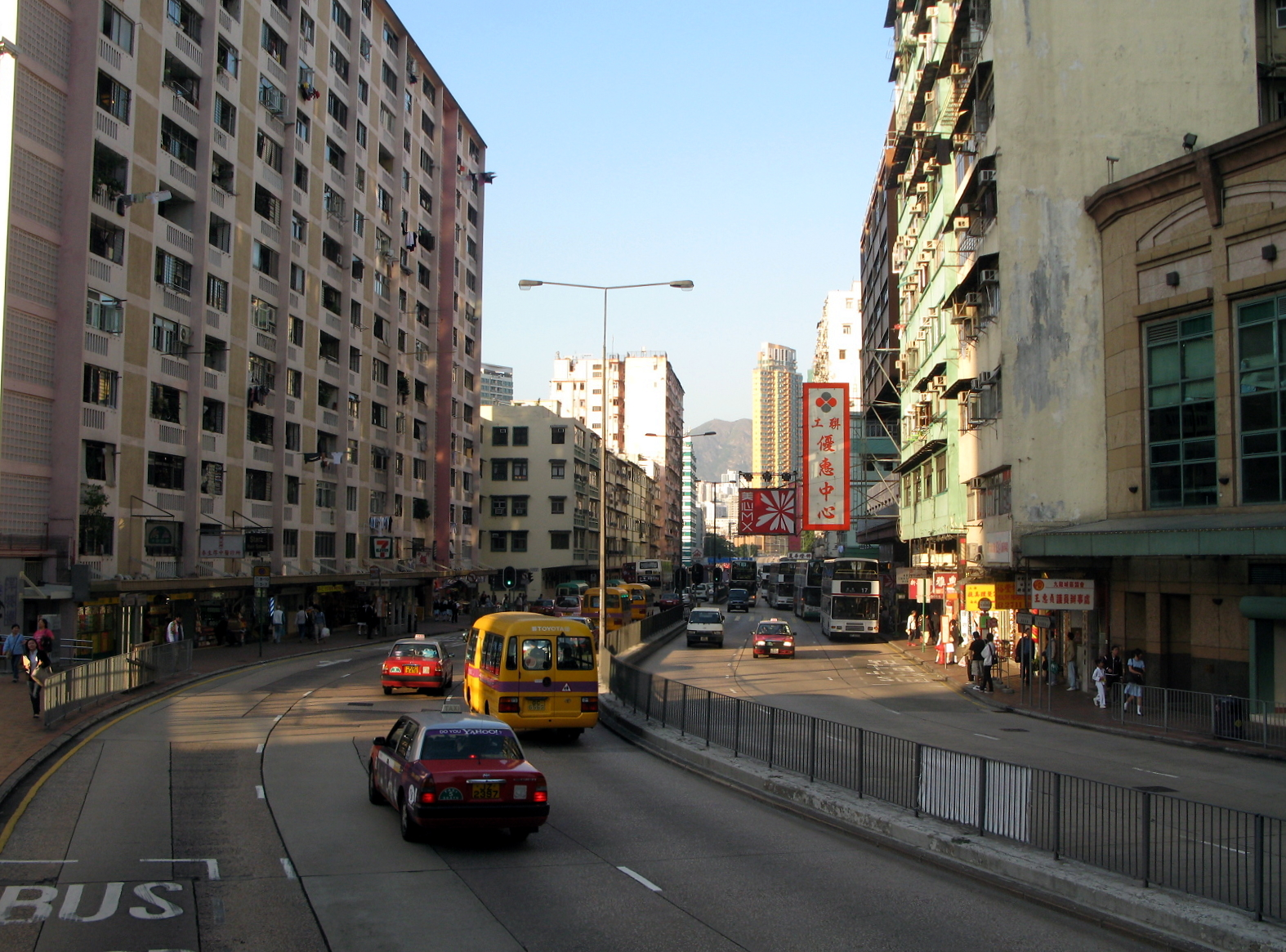
A view of Ma Tau Chung Road

Ma Tau Chung (Chinese: 馬頭涌 or 碼頭涌) is an area in Kowloon, Hong Kong, west of Ma Tau Kok and east of Ma Tau Wai. It was named after a creek (hence 涌, Chung, in the name) which originated in Quarry Hill emptying into Kowloon Bay. The village of Ma Tau Chung stood on its banks near the river mouth near the Sacred Hill.

Ma Tau Chung Road is named after the historical place name. It is the major surface road for traffic between Kowloon City and other areas to the east, onwards through Prince Edward Road West and Prince Edward Road East, and areas in southern Kowloon, through Ma Tau Wai Road.

== History ==
According to gazette of xin an county, Emperor Bing of the southern Song dynasty (AD 1127 – AD 1279) settled in Ma Tau Chung and the surrounding Song Wong Toi area for a few months. During the Japanese occupation of Hong Kong in the Second World War between 1941 and 1945, most of the Indian prisoners of war (POWs) captured in Hong Kong were interned at a POW camp here. The Japanese 'encouraged' these men to join the Indian National Army of the Indian Independence League, but met with little success. While hundreds of these POWs were not considered a threat by the Japanese, and were used as 'guards' at Gun Club Hill Barracks and other areas, 500–600 Indian soldiers considered anti-Japanese were held at Ma Tau Chung in very unpleasant circumstances. There were many deaths, and the men were buried just outside the camp near the vegetable gardens of the Argyle Street Camp immediately on the other side of Argyle Street.

Where Chun Seen Mei Chuen now stands was the Ma Tau Chung Cottage Area, which existed since 1938 and taken over and expanded by the Hong Kong Housing Society in 1955, until demolition in 1962 to make way for the construction of Chun Seen Mei Chuen.

== Geography ==
Ma Tau Chung was a creek. It was converted to an underground drainage. There was a village and land area that named after the stream.

In modern-day the place name is not commonly used, or replaced with Ma Tau Wai, Ma Tau Kok or Kowloon City, the names of nearby neighbourhoods. For example, most news articles describe Sung Wong Toi Garden as located in Kowloon City, while Ta Kung Pao once used Ma Tau Chung, Kowloon City district. The official address of Hong Kong Aviation Club is Sung Wong Toi Road, Kowloon City, but secondary sources used Sung Wong Toi Road, Ma Tau Chung. Chun Seen Mei Chuen, once credited as located in Ma Tau Chung, the current official address is Fu Ning Street, Kowloon City. Argyle Street Playground, corner Argyle Street and Ma Tau Chung Road, was also credited as located in Ma Tau Chung in 1958, but known as inside Kowloon City in recent years.

== Politics ==
Most of the area is covered by the western end of the Sung Wong Toi constituency in the Kowloon City District Council. This constituency was previously named Kai Tak until 2015. The seat has been held by Yeung Chun Yu since 2012, who was first elected as an ADPL candidate but now sits as an independent. The rest of the area are represented by the Ma Tau Wai and the Ma Hang Chung constituencies.

== Transport ==
Apart from Ma Tau Chung Road, other major roads and streets in the area include Tam Kung Road. Sung Wong Toi Road, Ma Tau Kok Road and Mok Cheong Street (Chinese: 木廠街) connects the area with Ma Tau Kok.

Sung Wong Toi station on Tuen Ma line of the MTR serves the area and will be connected through pedestrian subways to Kau Pui Shek (珓杯石), as well as nearby Kowloon City across the Boundary Street in New Kowloon.

== See also ==
- List of places in Hong Kong
