= To Kwa Wan station =

MTR station in Kowloon, Hong Kong

To Kwa Wan 土瓜灣
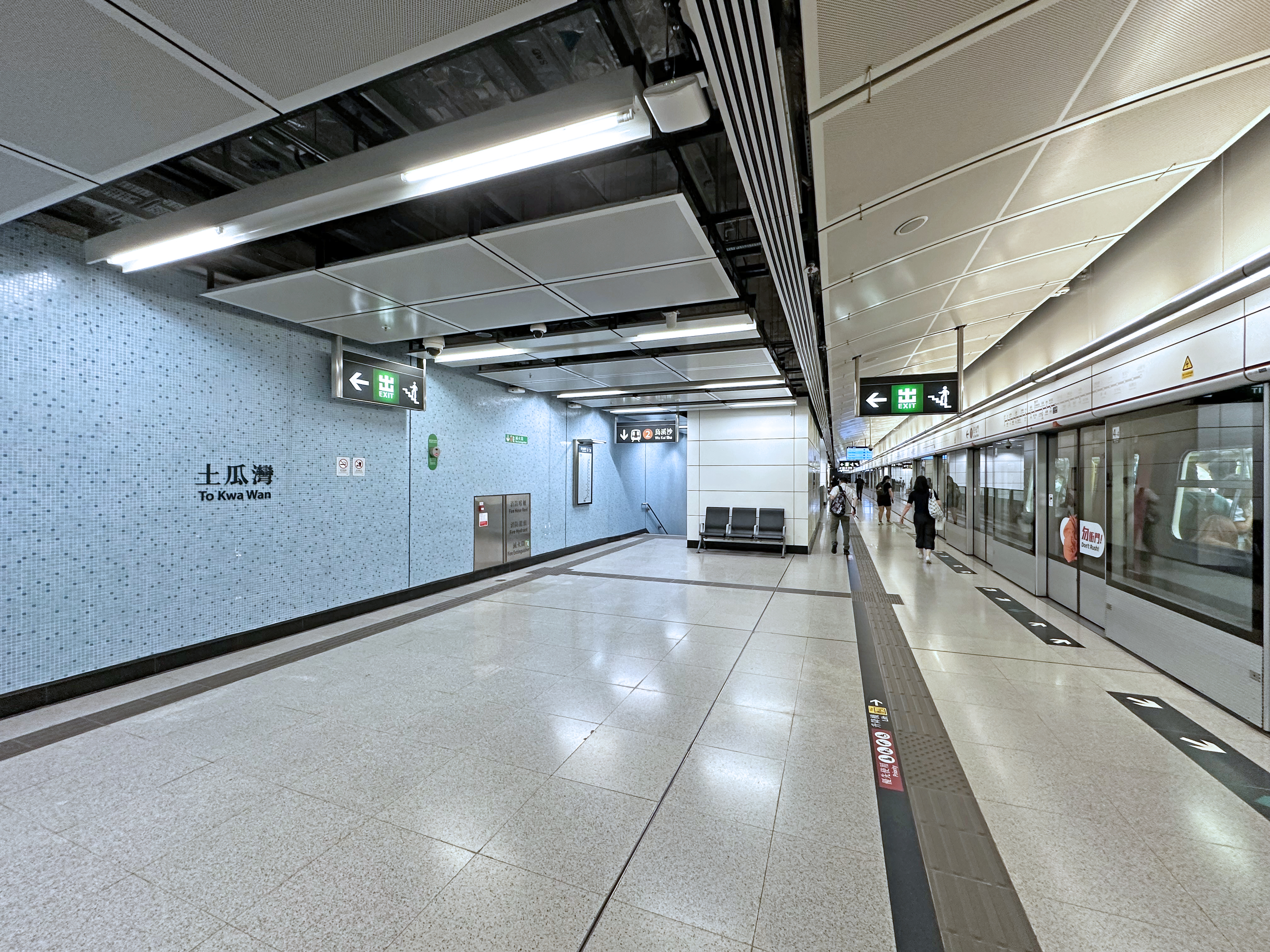
- Platform 1

Chinese name
- Chinese: 土瓜灣
- Simplified Chinese: 土瓜湾
- Cantonese Yale: Tóugwāawàahn
- Literal meaning: Clay Melon Bay
Transcriptions
Standard Mandarin
- Hanyu Pinyin: Tǔguāwān
Yue: Cantonese
- Yale Romanization: Tóugwāawàahn
- Jyutping: tou2gwaa1waan4

General information
- Location: Ma Tau Wai Road × Lok Shan Road, To Kwa Wan; Kowloon City District, Hong Kong
- Coordinates: 22°19′02″N 114°11′15″E
- System: MTR rapid transit station
- Owner: MTR Corporation
- Operator: MTR Corporation
- Line: Tuen Ma line
- Platforms: 2 (split platform in two levels)
- Tracks: 2

Construction
- Structure type: Underground

Other information
- Station code: TKW

History
- Opened: 27 June 2021; 5 years ago
- Former names: Ma Tau Wai

Services
Preceding station	MTR	Following station
Ho Man Tin towards Tuen Mun	Tuen Ma line	Sung Wong Toi towards Wu Kai Sha
Route map
Location
- Location within MTR Location within Hong Kong urban core

To Kwa Wan (Chinese: 土瓜灣) is an underground MTR rapid transit station on the Tuen Ma line in Hong Kong. It is located beneath Ma Tau Wai Road in central To Kwa Wan, Kowloon City District. The station was built as part of the Sha Tin to Central Link (SCL) project, and was opened on 27 June 2021 along with the rest of phase 2 of the Tuen Ma line (Kai Tak to Hung Hom). Its livery is baby blue.

The station was constructed by a Samsung–Hsin Chong joint venture. During the planning stage, the station was provisionally named as Mau Tau Wai (Chinese: 馬頭圍) before being changed to To Kwa Wan in 2017.

== Station layout ==
G	Ground level	Exits
L1	Concourse	Customer service, MTR shops
L2; Upper Platform	Platform 1	← Tuen Ma line towards Tuen Mun (Ho Man Tin)
L2; Upper Platform	Side platform, doors will open on the left
L4; Lower Platform	Platform 2	Tuen Ma line towards Wu Kai Sha (Sung Wong Toi) →
L4; Lower Platform	Side platform, doors will open on the right

The platforms are stacked as the station is located under the narrow Ma Tau Wai Road with a high concentration of nearby buildings. This arrangement also allows trains to switch running sides. Trains on platform 1 switch to the left-hand side running, while trains on platform 2 switch to the right-hand side running. This is necessary since the Ma On Shan Rail was built with trains run on the right-hand side to facilitate interchange at Tai Wai, whereas on the West Rail line, trains run on the left like other railway lines in the territory.

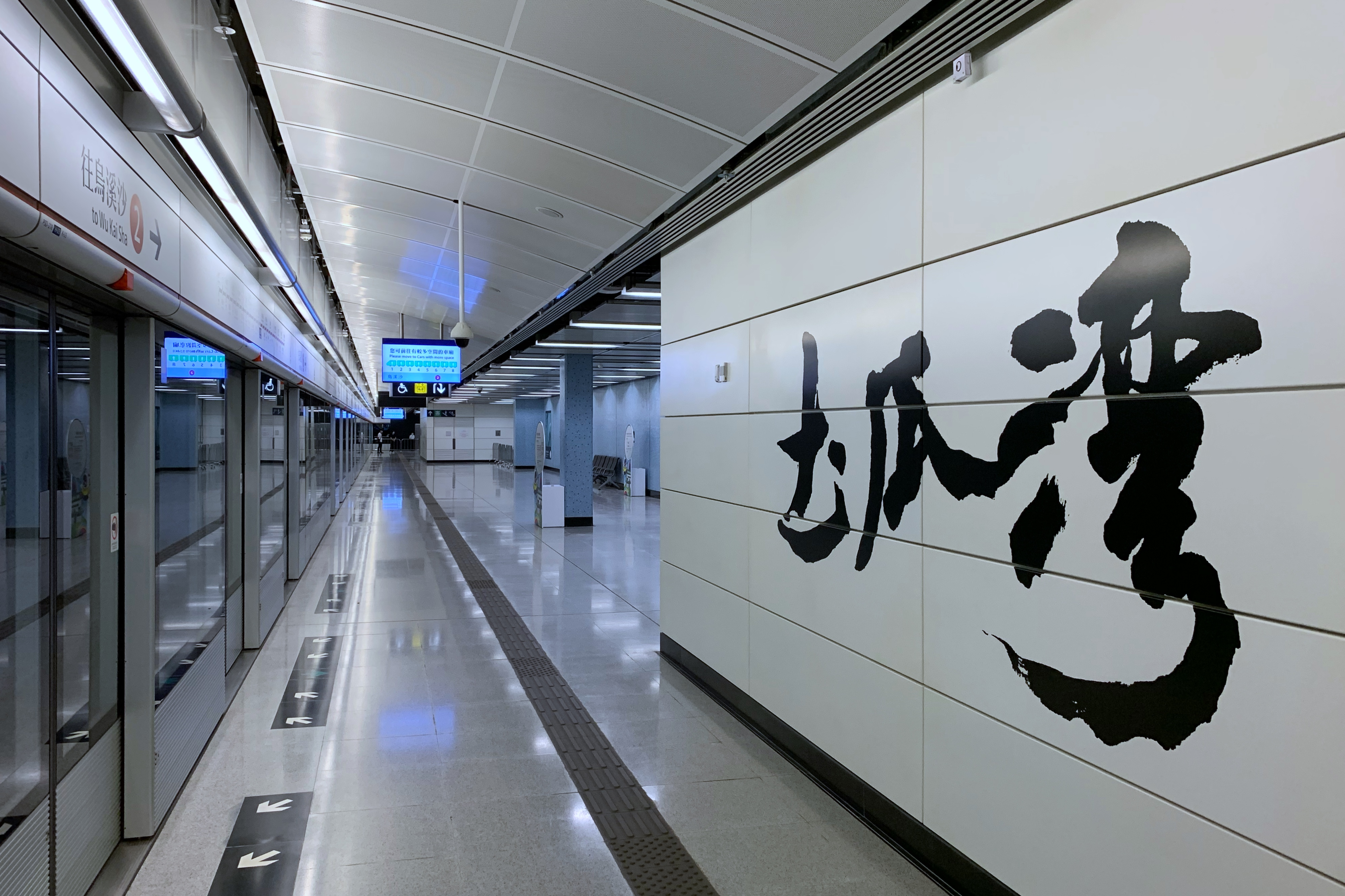
Platform 2, in the To Kwa Wan Station (June 2021)

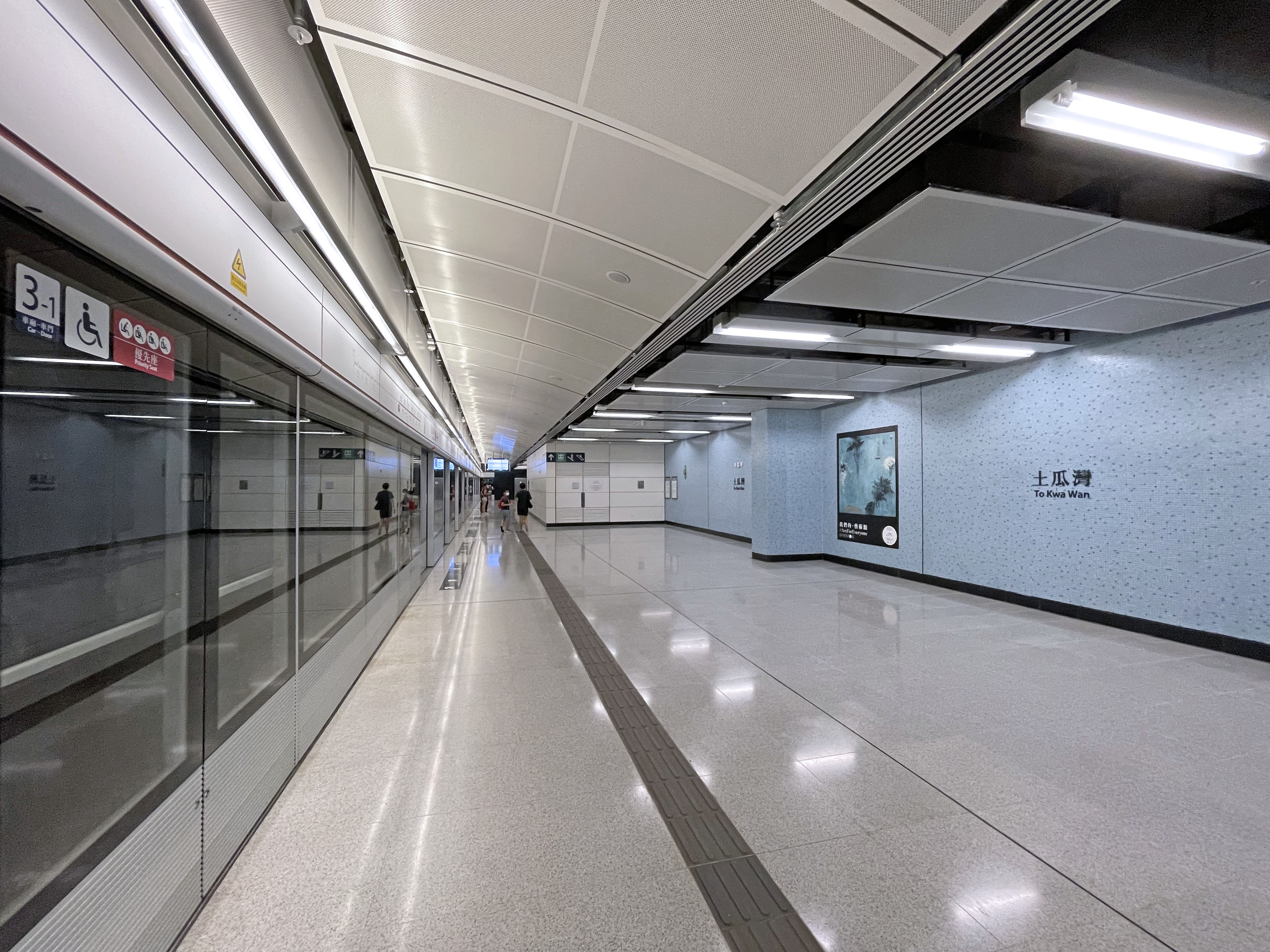
Platform 2, in the To Kwa Wan Station (June 2021)

== Exits ==
- A: Pau Chung Street
- B: Lok Man Sun Chuen Phase 1
- C: Lok Man Sun Chuen Phase 2 and 3
- D1: Ma Tau Wai Road
- D2: Chi Kiang Street

== Gallery ==
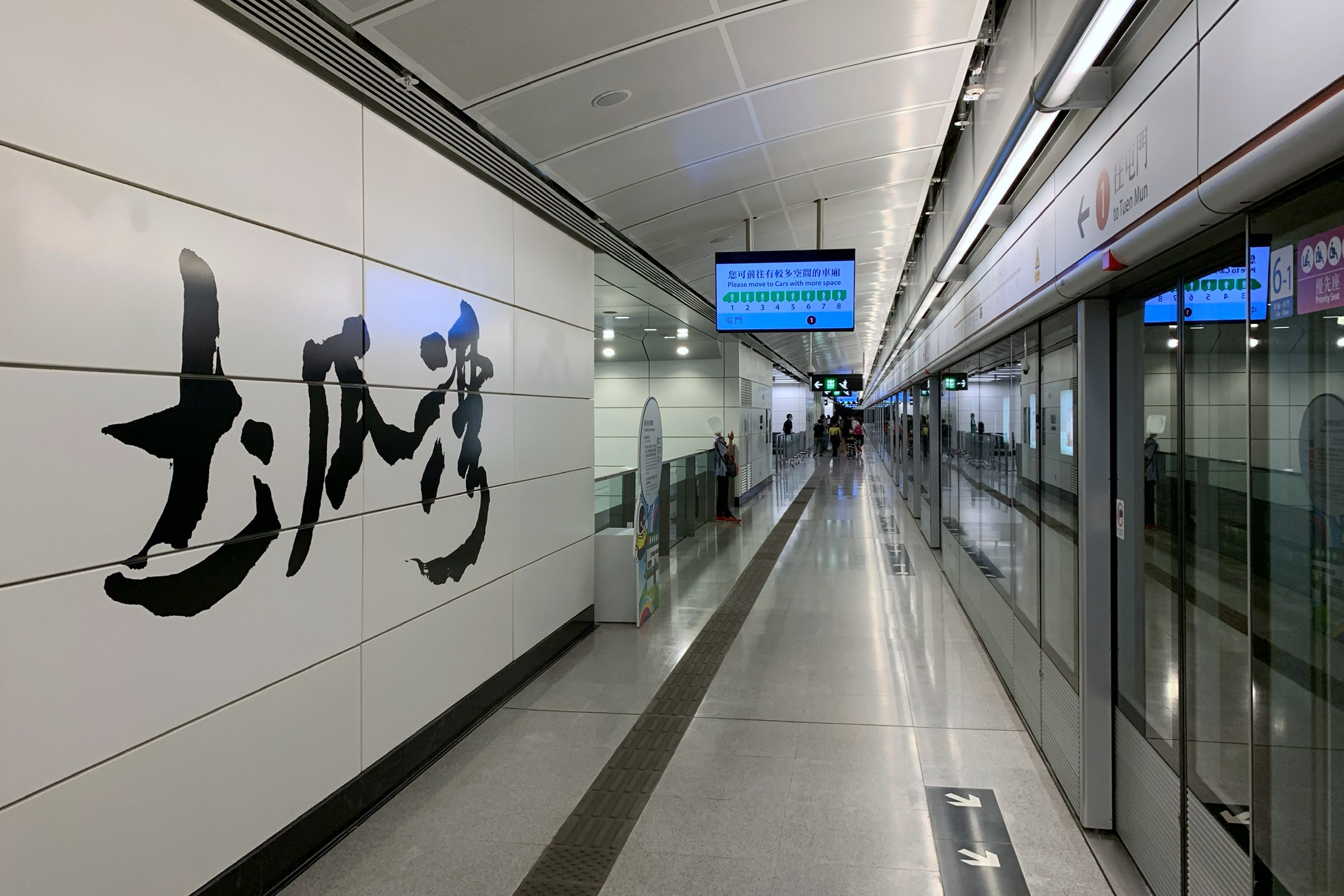
Platform 1

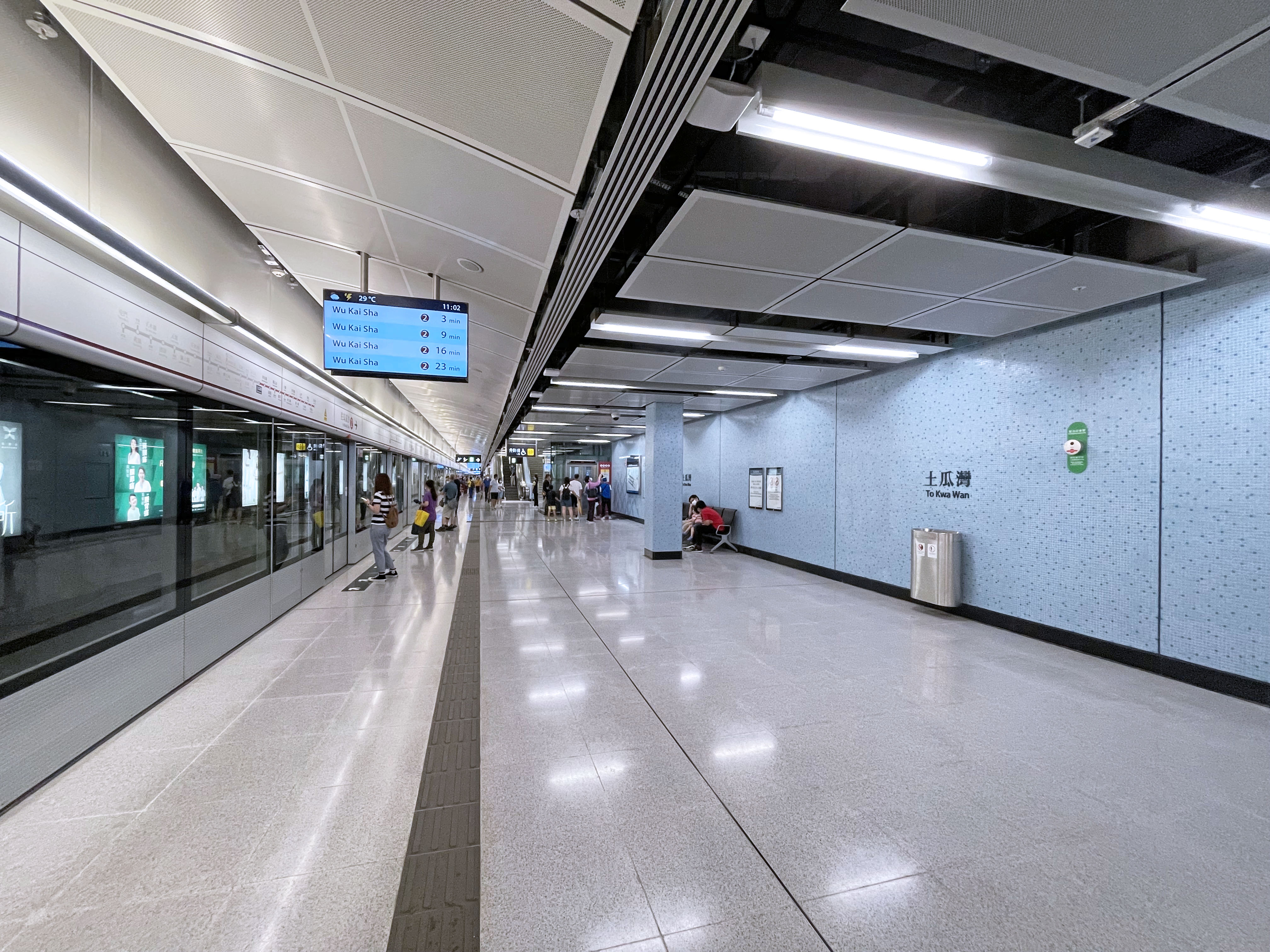
Platform 2 Area

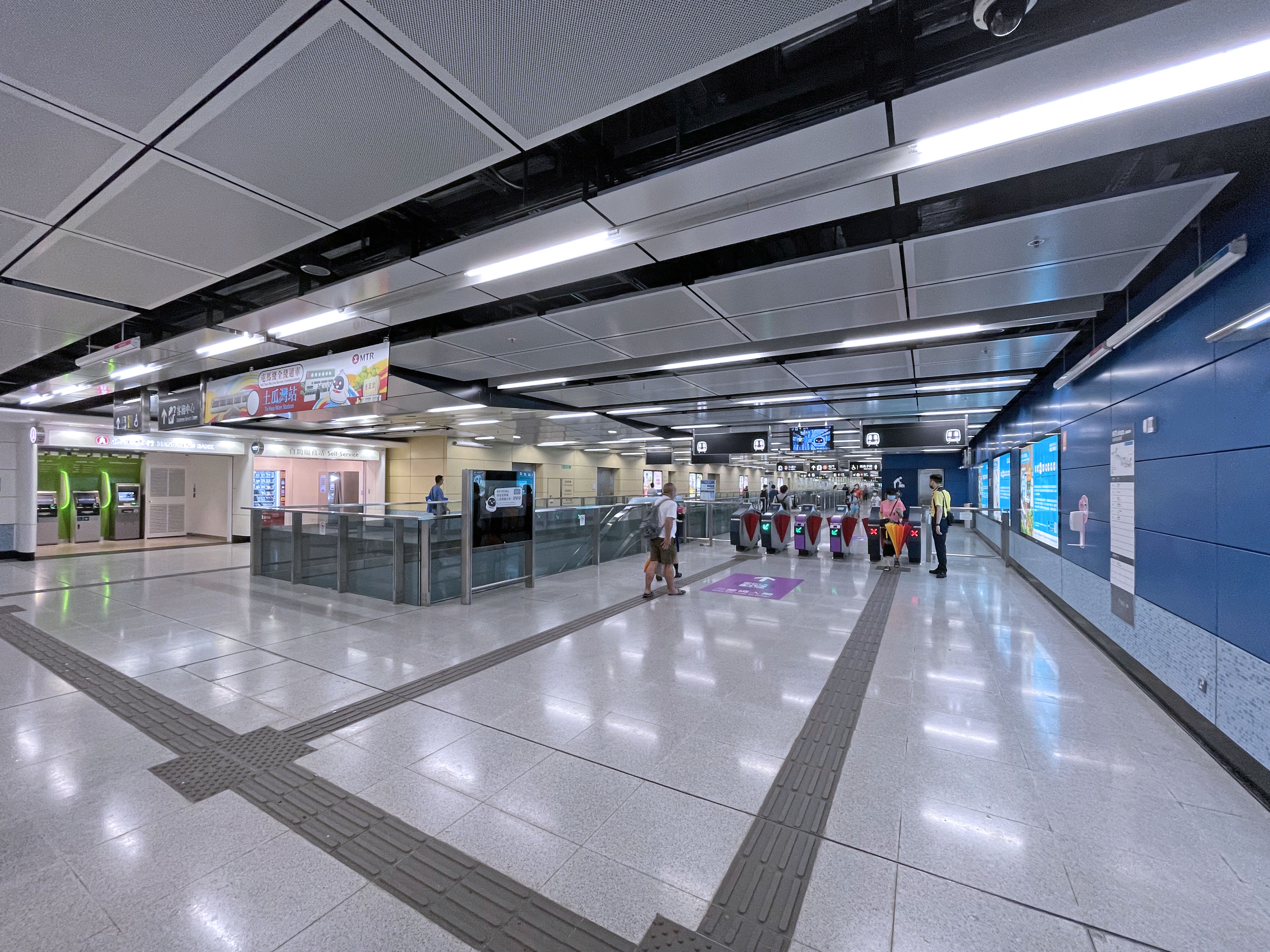
Concourse

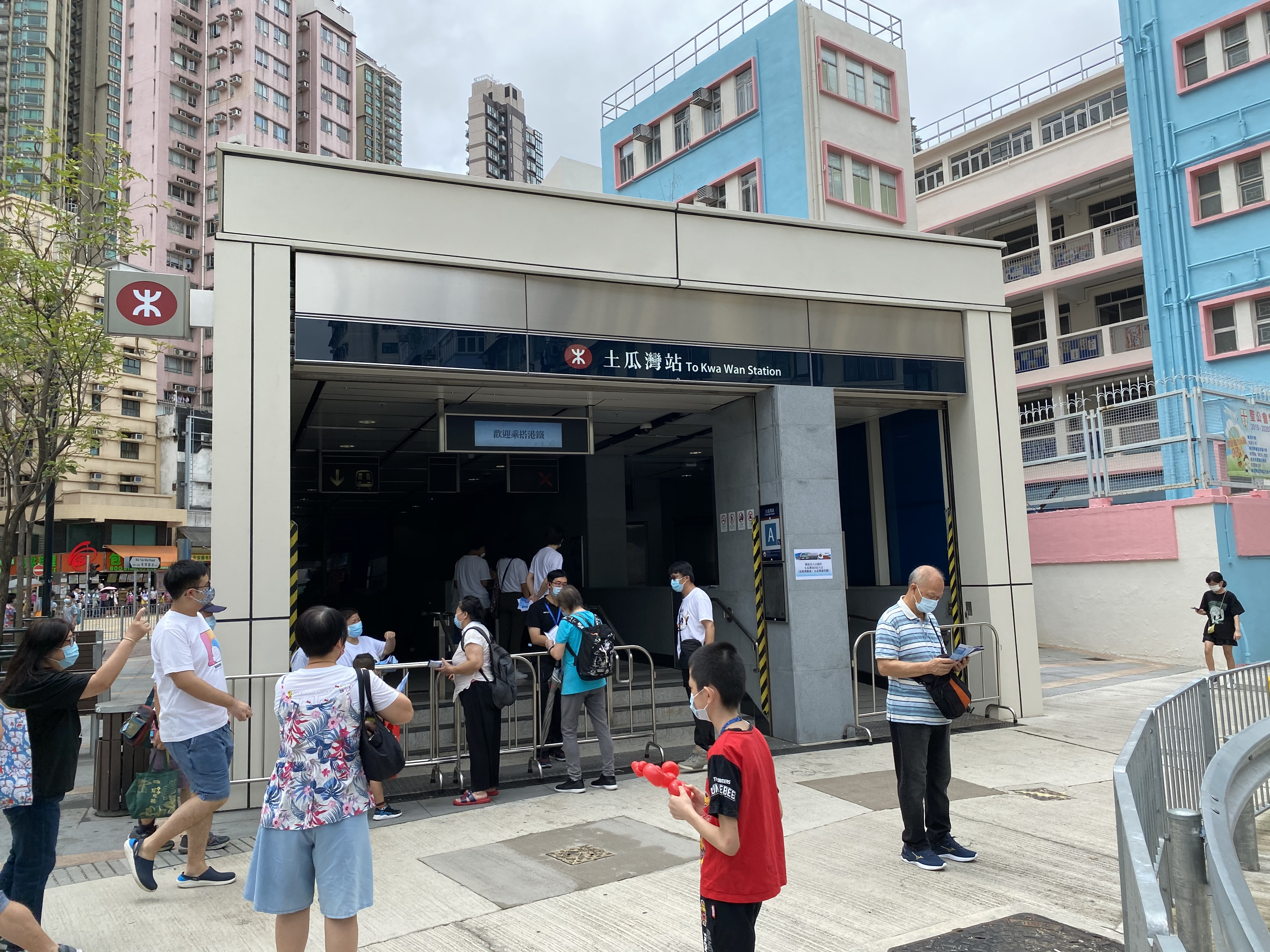
Exit A

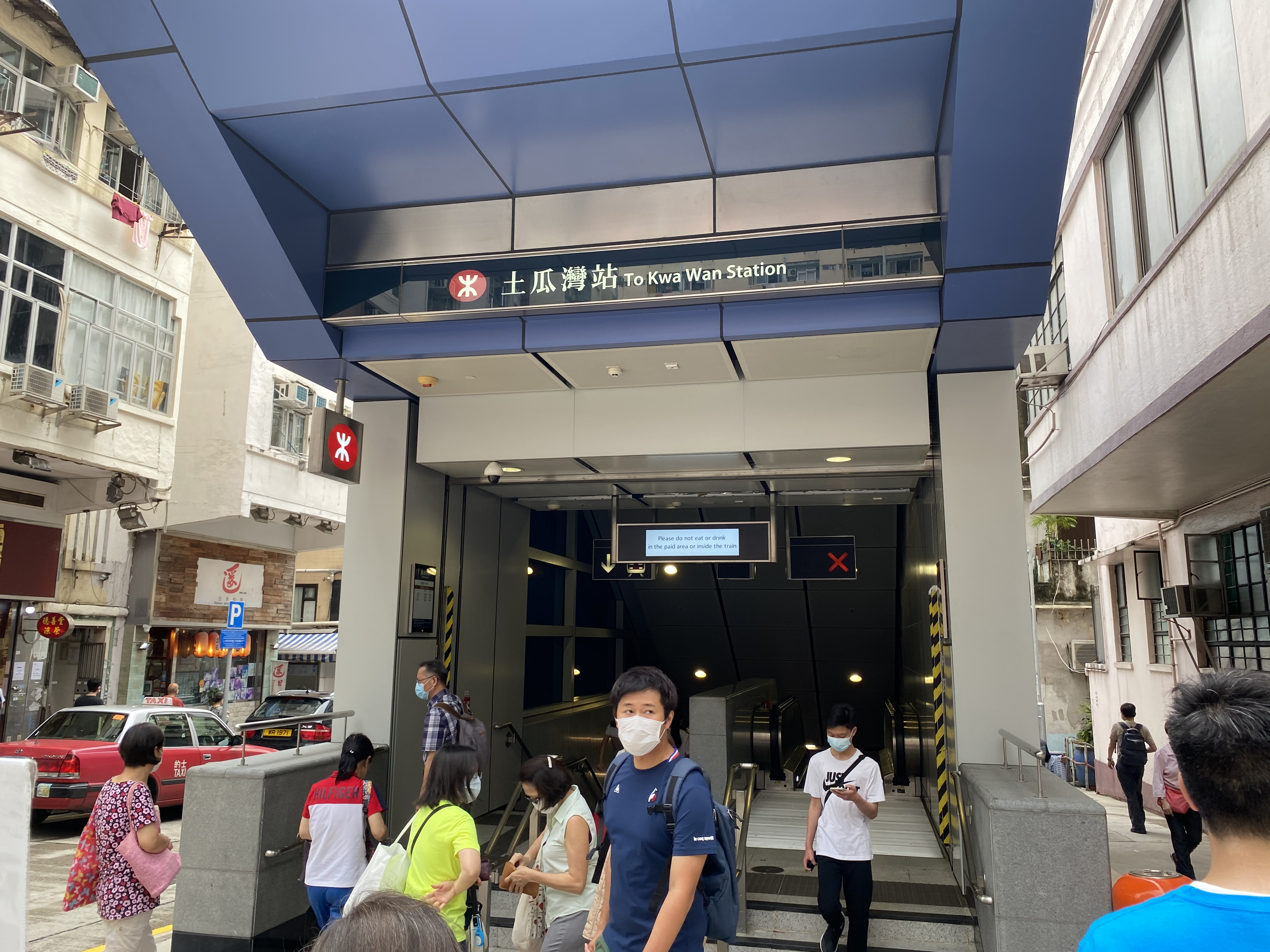
Exit B

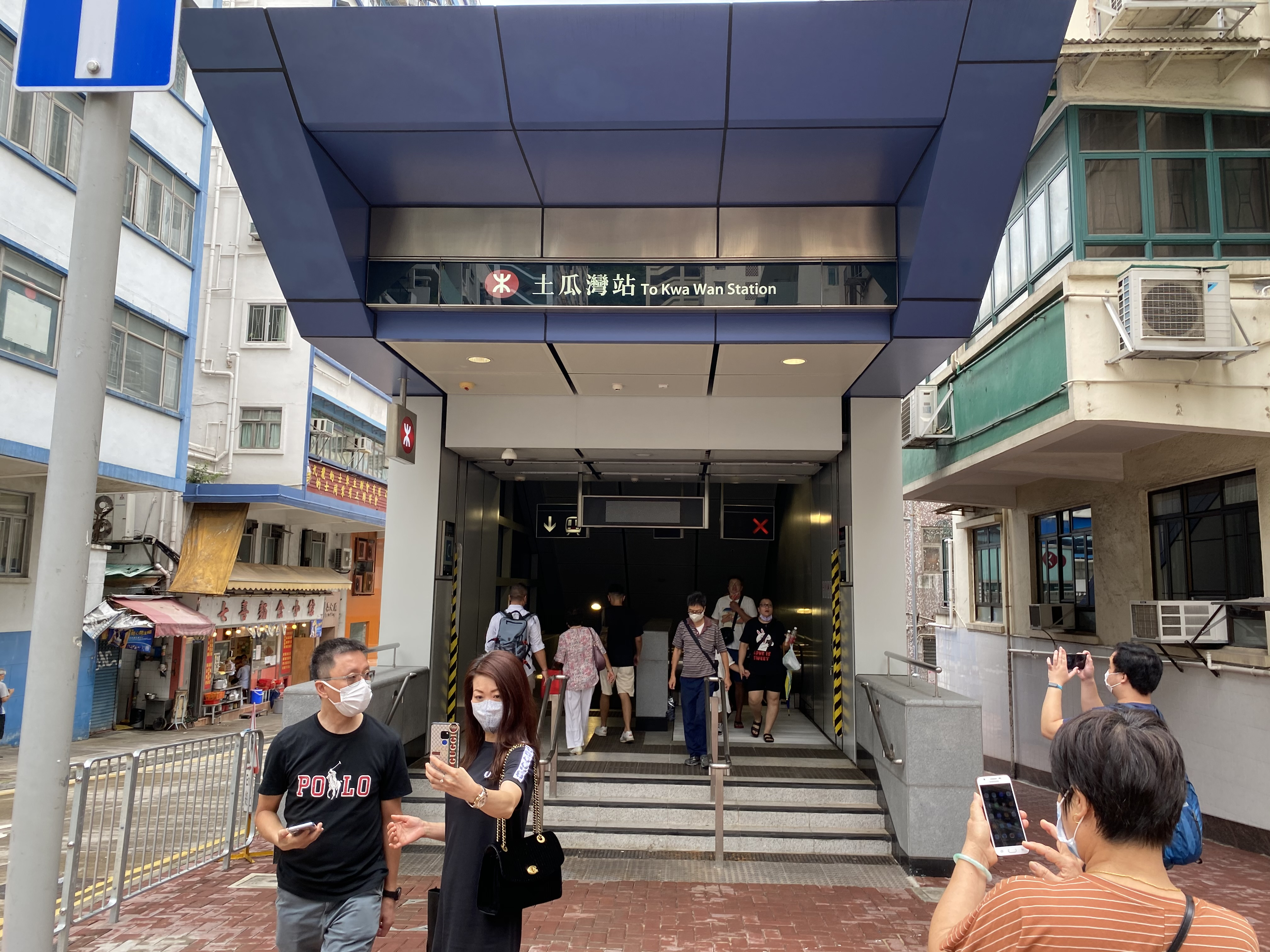
Exit D1

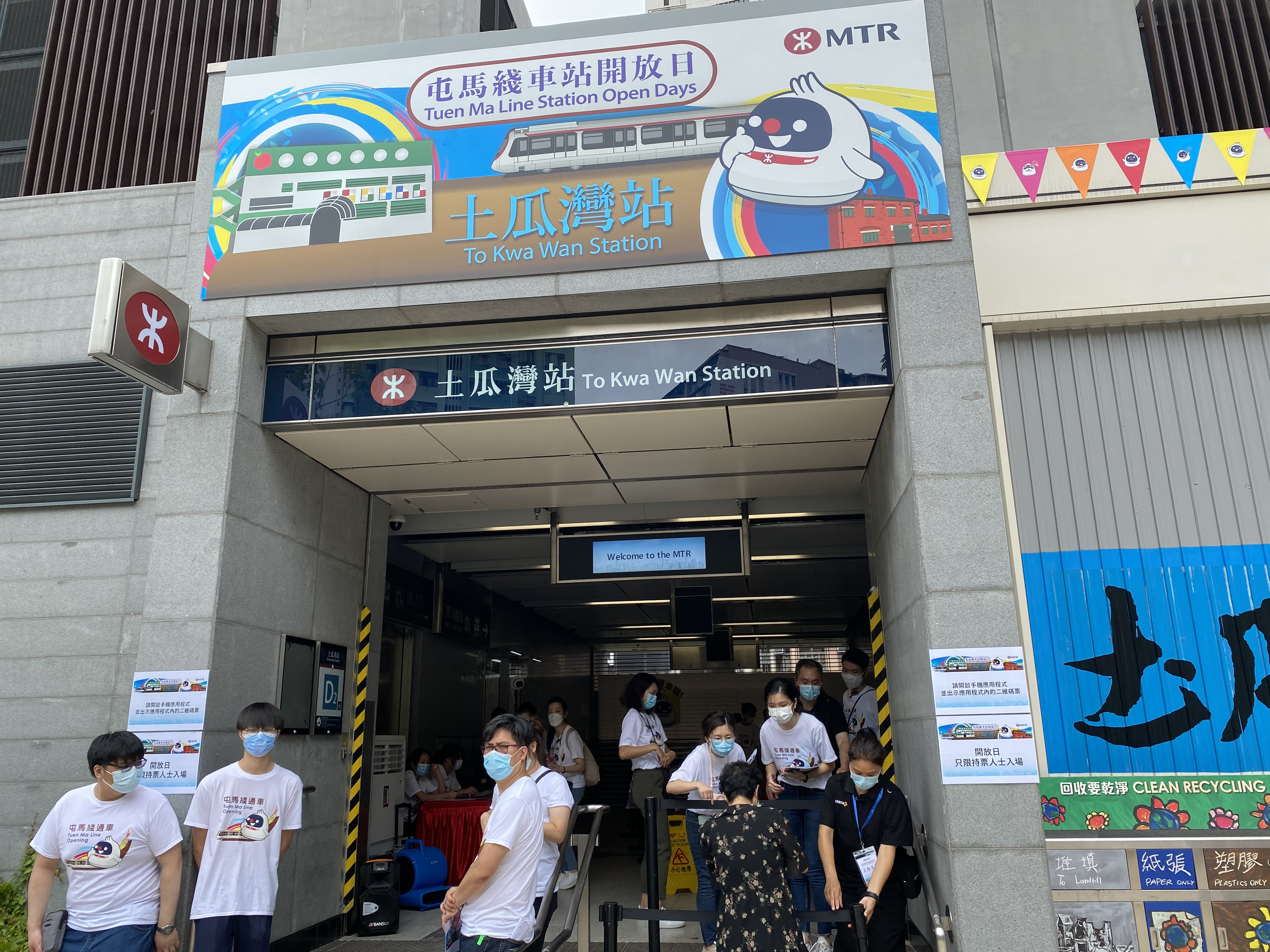
Exit D2
