= Ma Tau Wai Estate =

Public housing estate in Ma Tau Wai, Hong Kong

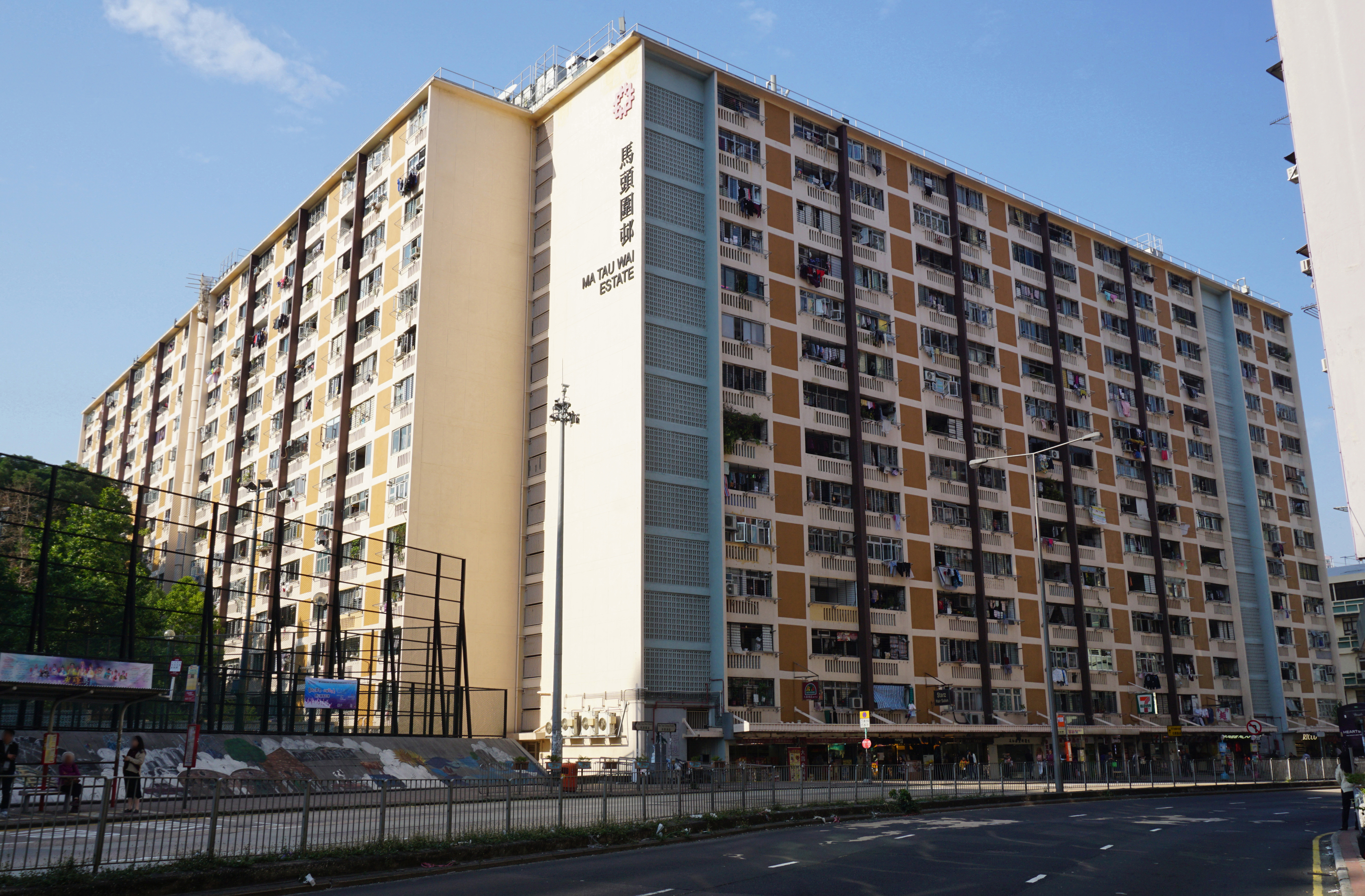
- Geranium House of Ma Tau Wai Estate
- Interactive map of Ma Tau Wai Estate

General information
- Location: 9 Shing Tak Street, Ma Tau Wai; Kowloon, Hong Kong
- Coordinates: 22.322835°N 114.187215°E
- Status: Completed
- Category: Public rental housing
- Population: 5,194 (2016)
- No. of blocks: 5
- No. of units: 2,075

Construction
- Constructed: 1962; 64 years ago
- Authority: Hong Kong Housing Society

Ma Tau Wai Estate
- Traditional Chinese: 馬頭圍邨
- Simplified Chinese: 马头围邨
Transcriptions
Standard Mandarin
- Hanyu Pinyin: Mǎtóu Wéi Cūn
Yue: Cantonese
- Jyutping: maa5 tau4 wai4 cyun1

Ma Tau Wai Estate (Chinese: 馬頭圍邨) is a public housing estate in Ma Tau Wai, Kowloon, Hong Kong. It is the oldest existing public housing estate in Kowloon City District and it consists of five residential blocks completed in 1962 and 1965. Although it was developed by Hong Kong Housing Authority, it is currently managed by Hong Kong Housing Society.

== Background ==
The location of the estate was partly the location of the Ma Tau Chung Camp during World War II. In 2007, the Housing Authority found that all buildings in the estate were structurally sound. Thus, structural repair and improvement works will be carried out to sustain the buildings for the next 15 years.

=== Reconstruction plan ===
In March 2014, the Hong Kong Housing Authority announced that in order to increase the supply of public housing, it has decided to start planning and reconstruction of 20 housing estates, including Ma Tau Wai Estate, which have been completed for more than 40 years, and will conduct a series of technical studies in order to determine the reconstruction schedule.

== Houses ==
| Name | Chinese name | Building type | Completed |
|---|---|---|---|
| Hibiscus House | 芙蓉樓 | Old Slab | 1962 |
| Magnolia House | 夜合樓 | Old Slab | 1962 |
| Rose House | 玫瑰樓 | Old Slab | 1962 |
| Narcissus House | 水仙樓 | Old Slab | 1962 |
| Geranium House | 洋葵樓 | Old Slab | 1965 |

== Demographics ==
According to the 2016 by-census, Hung Hom Estate had a population of 5,194. The median age was 51.4 and the majority of residents (96.7 per cent) were of Chinese ethnicity. The average household size was 2.6 people. The median monthly household income of all households (i.e. including both economically active and inactive households) was HK$19,250.

== Politics ==
Ma Tau Wai Estate is located in Ma Tau Wai constituency of the Kowloon City District Council. It is currently represented by Ken Tsang Kin-chiu, who was elected in the 2019 elections.

== Education ==
Ma Tau Wai Estate is in Primary One Admission (POA) School Net 34. Within the school net are multiple aided schools (operated independently but funded with government money) and two government schools: Farm Road Government Primary School and Ma Tau Chung Government Primary School.

== See also ==
- Public housing estates in Hung Hom, To Kwa Wan and Ma Tau Wai
