= Public housing estates in Hung Hom, To Kwa Wan and Ma Tau Wai =

Public housing in Kowloon, Hong Kong

The following is an overview of public housing estates in Hung Hom, To Kwa Wan and Ma Tau Wai, of Kowloon City District, Hong Kong, including Home Ownership Scheme (HOS), Private Sector Participation Scheme (PSPS), and Tenant Purchase Scheme (TPS) estates.

== Overview ==
Name		Type	Inaug.	No Blocks	No Units	Notes
Hung Hom Estate	紅磡邨	Public	1999	5	2,800	
Ma Tau Wai Estate	馬頭圍邨	Public	1962	5	2,075	
Chun Seen Mei Chuen	真善美村	Public	1965	3	1,027	HK Housing Society
Ka Wai Chuen	家維邨	Flat-for-Sale/Rental	1984,1987,1990,1993	9	2,568	HK Housing Society
Lok Man Sun Chuen	樂民新村	Public	1970, 1971, 1973, 1974	9	3,676	HK Housing Society

== Hung Hom Estate ==
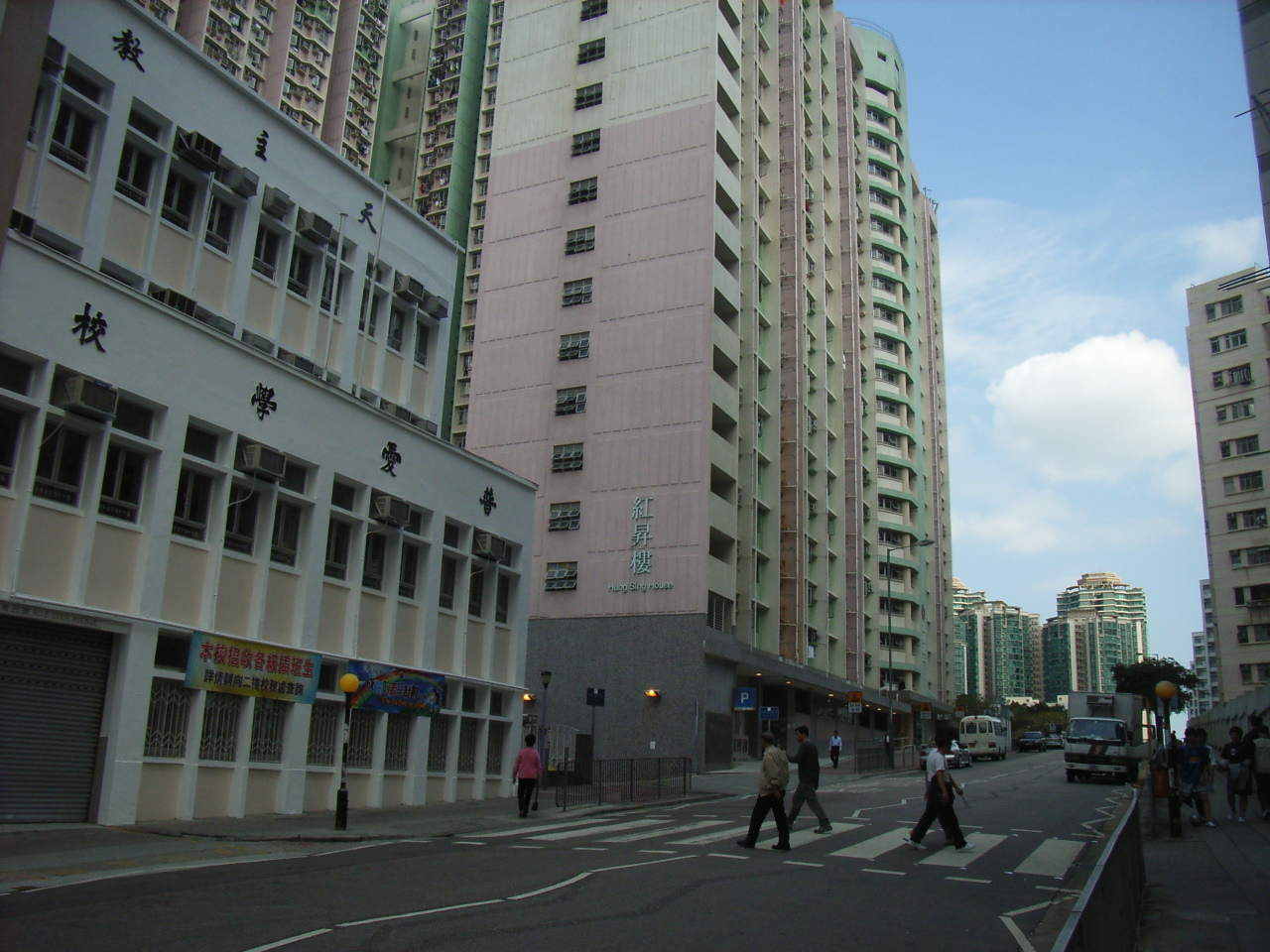
Hung Hom Estate Phase 1

Hung Hom Estate (Chinese: 紅磡邨) is built on a hill along Dyer Avenue and next to Whampoa Estate and Whampoa Garden. It now consists of five residential buildings completed in two stages in 1999 and 2011 respectively.

The estate, informally called Tai Wan Shan Resettlement Estate (Chinese: 大環山徙置區) or Tai Wan Shan Estate (Chinese: 大環山邨), was a resettlement estate built in Tai Wan Shan, a hill in Hung Hom area. It had four 7-storey blocks completed in 1956. All four blocks were demolished for redevelopment in 1996 and 2000. Completed 1999, redevelopment phase 1 project consists of two residential buildings built in the former site of Block 3 and 4. Redevelopment phase 2, finished 2011, consists of three more 40-storey buildings on the former site of Block 1 and Block 3.

=== Houses ===
Name	Type	Completion
Hung Fai House	Harmony 3	1999
Hung Sing House	Small Household Block	1999
Hung Yat House	Non-standard block	2011
Hung Yan House	Non-standard block	2011
Hung Yiu House	Non-standard block	2011

== Ma Tau Wai Estate ==
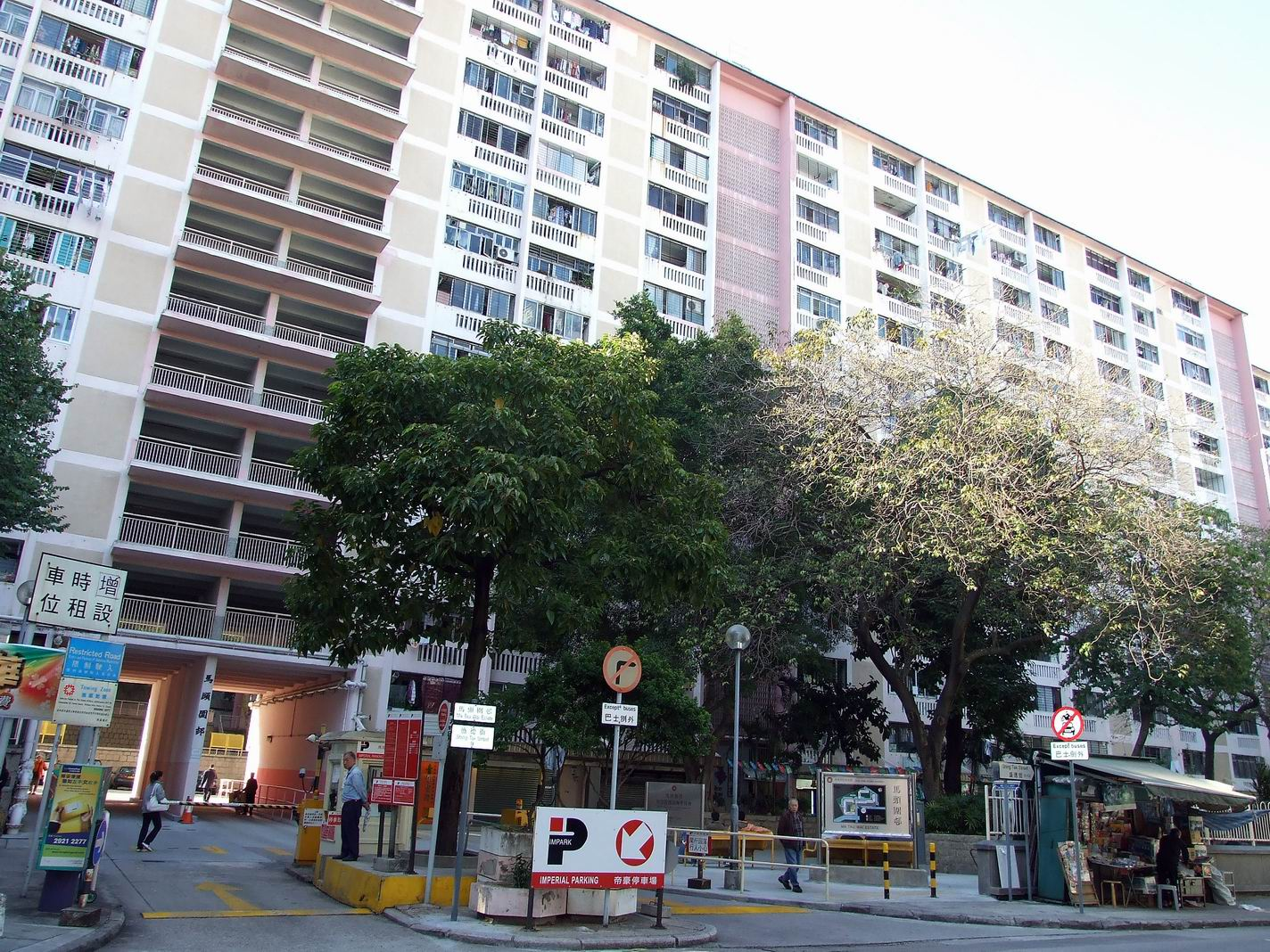
Ma Tau Wai Estate

Ma Tau Wai Estate (Chinese: 馬頭圍邨) is the oldest existing public housing estate in Kowloon City District. It consists of 5 residential blocks completed in 1962 and 1965. Although it was developed by Hong Kong Housing Authority, it is currently managed by Hong Kong Housing Society.

The location of the estate was partly the location of the Ma Tau Chung Camp during World War II. In 2007, the Housing Authority found that all buildings in the estate were structurally sound. Thus, structural repair and improvement works will be carried out to sustain the buildings for the next 15 years.

=== Houses ===
Name	Type	Completion
Hibiscus House	Old Slab	1962
Magnolia House	Old Slab	1962
Rose House	Old Slab	1962
Narcissus House	Old Slab	1962
Geranium House	Old Slab	1965

== Chun Seen Mei Chuen ==
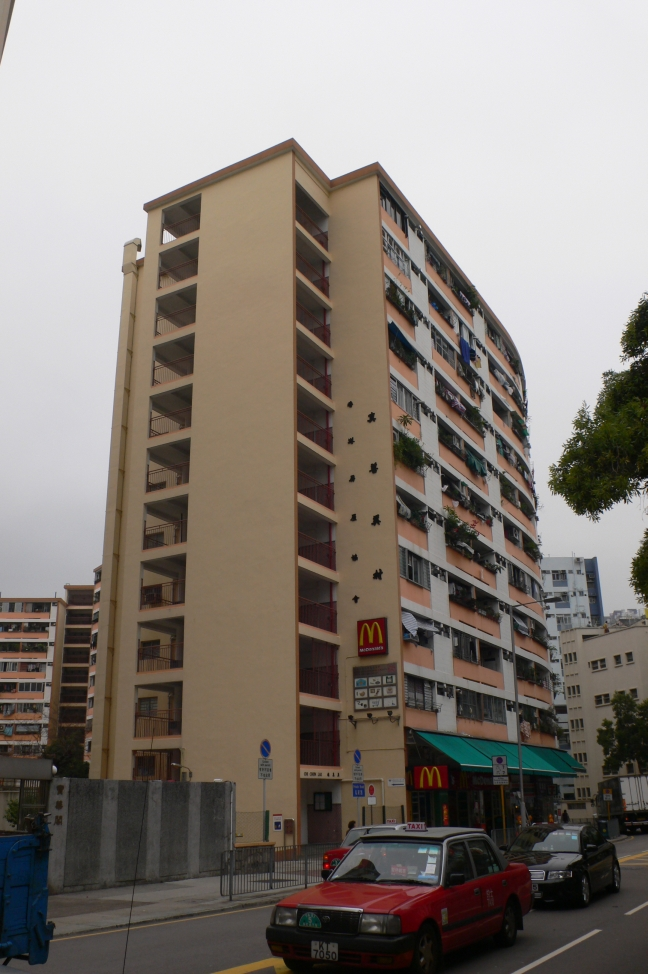
Chun Seen Mei Chuen

Chun Seen Mei Chuen (Chinese: 真善美村) has three residential blocks built in 1965, providing a total of 1027 units.

=== Houses ===
Name	Completion
Chi Chun Lau	1965
Chi Sin Lau	1965
Chi Mei Lau	1965

Chun Seen Mei Chuen is in Primary One Admission (POA) School Net 34. Within the school net are multiple aided schools (operated independently but funded with government money) and two government schools: Farm Road Government Primary School and Ma Tau Chung Government Primary School.

== Ka Wai Chuen ==
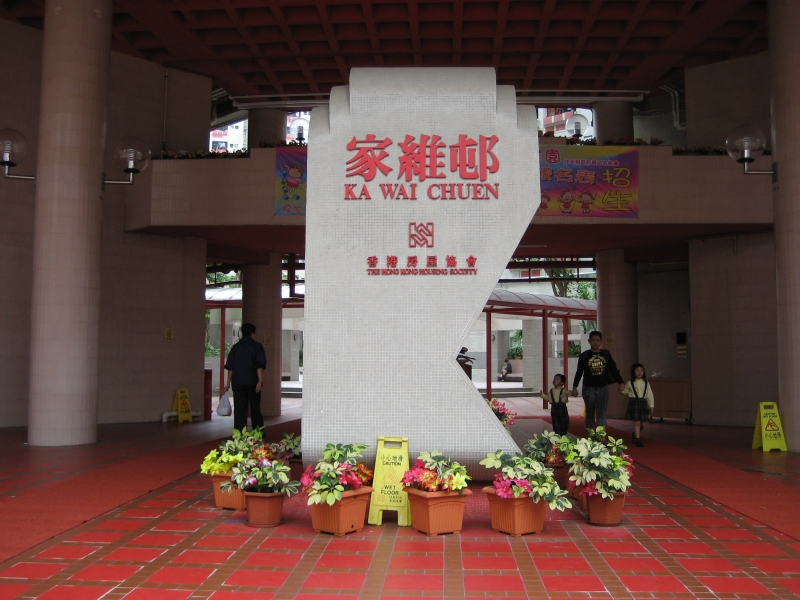
Ka Wai Chuen

Ka Wai Chuen (Chinese: 家維邨) is a mixed public and a Flat-for-Sale Scheme estate developed by Hong Kong Housing Society in the vicinity of Fat Kwong Street, Ma Tau Wai Road and Station Lane. It has 9 residential blocks completed in 1984, 1987, 1990 and 1993. Five of the blocks are for rental while 4 of them are for sale.

Ka Wai Chuen was built on the former site of the old Hung Hom Estate (Chinese: 紅磡邨) and consisted of nine 6-storey blocks built between 1955 and 1958. The estate was redeveloped into 4 phases, and nine buildings were constructed in 1984, 1987, 1990 and 1993. In 1990, the estate was renamed to the current Ka Wai Chuen, which was named from the pen name of Mr. Andrew Cheung Yau Kuen, one of the founders of Hong Kong Housing Society.

=== Houses ===
Name	Completion	Scheme
Ka Lai Lau	1984	Rental housing
Ka Hing Lau	1987	Rental housing
Ka Bong Lau	1987	Rental housing
Ka Yee Lau	1990	Rental housing
Ka Lim Lau	1990	Rental housing
Ka Wing Lau	1990	Flat-for-Sale Scheme
Ka Shing Lau	1993	Flat-for-Sale Scheme
Ka On Lau	1993	Flat-for-Sale Scheme
Ka Ting Lau	1993	Flat-for-Sale Scheme

Ka Wai Chuen is in Primary One Admission (POA) School Net 35. Within the school net are multiple aided schools (operated independently but funded with government money) and Ma Tau Chung Government Primary School (Hung Hom Bay).

== Lok Man Sun Chuen ==
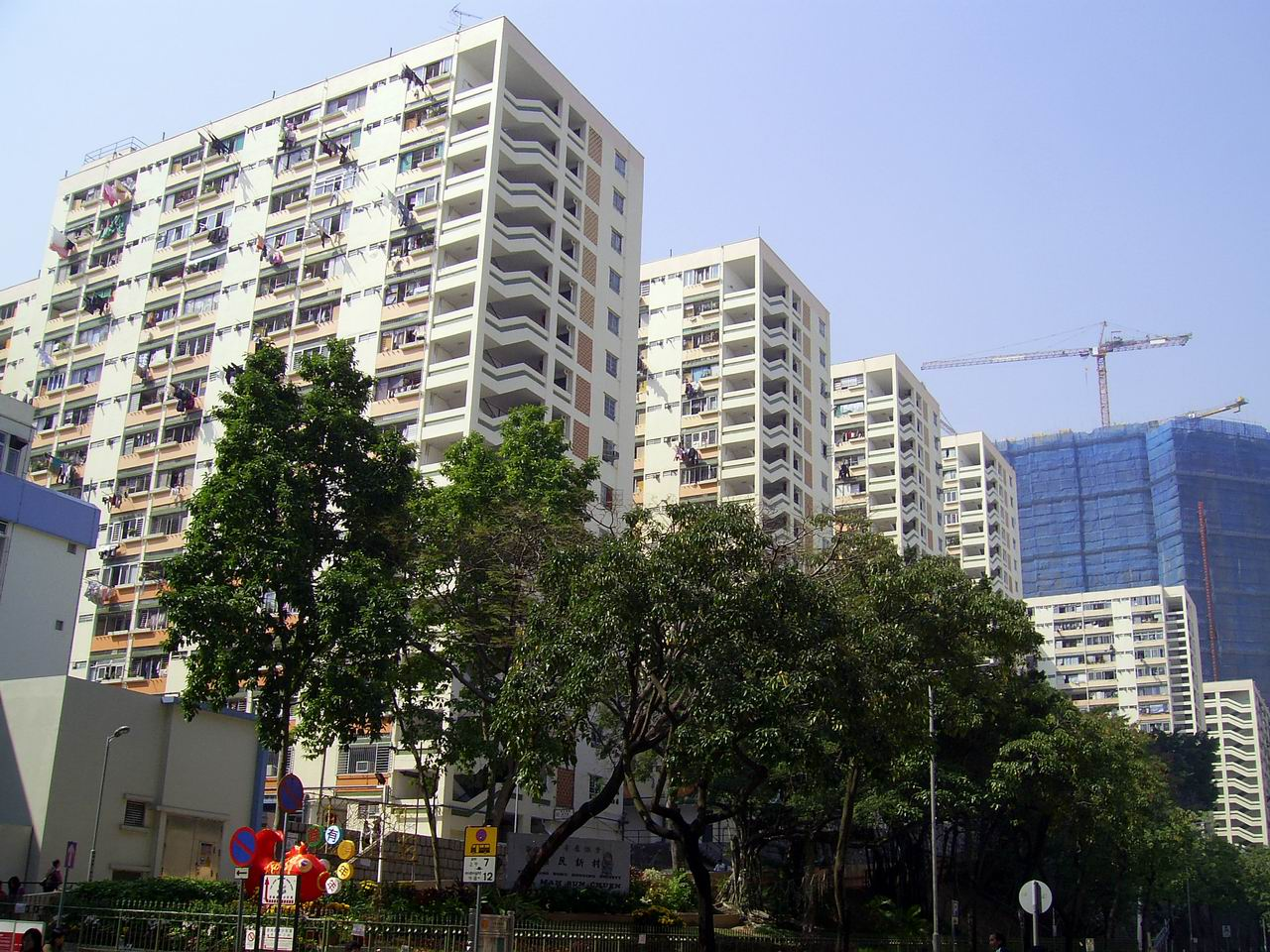
Lok Kei Lau, Lok Man Sun Chuen

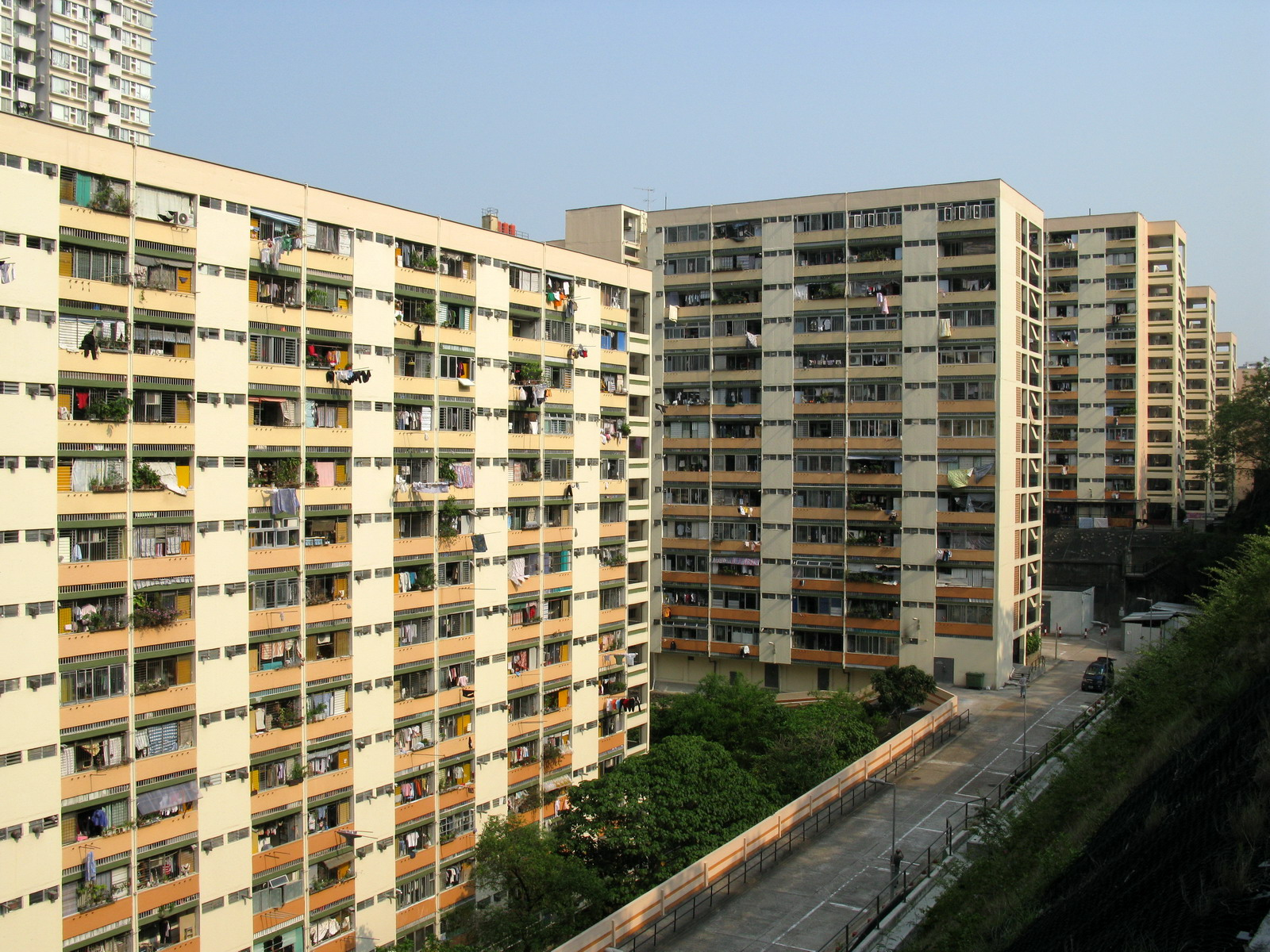
Lok Sin Lau and Lok Lun Lau, Lok Man Sun Chuen

Lok Man Sun Chuen (Chinese: 樂民新村) is located in Kau Pui Lung Road, To Kwa Wan, developed by Hong Kong Housing Society. It has nine residential blocks completed in 1970, 1971, 1973 and 1974 respectively, providing a total of 3676 units.

=== Houses ===
Name	Completion
Lok Kei Lau (Block A)	1970
Lok Kei Lau (Block B)	1970
Lok Tak Lau (Block C)	1970
Lok Fung Lau (Block D)	1970
Lok Kwan Lau (Block E)	1970
Lok Lun Lau (Block F)	1971
Lok Sin Lau (Block G)	1971
Lok Chee Lau (Block H)	1973–1974
Lok Oi Lau (Block I)	1973–1974

Lok Man Sun Chuen is in Primary One Admission (POA) School Net 34. Within the school net are multiple aided schools (operated independently but funded with government money) and two government schools: Farm Road Government Primary School and Ma Tau Chung Government Primary School.

== See also ==
- Public housing in Hong Kong
- List of public housing estates in Hong Kong
