= St. Paul's Hospital (Hong Kong) =

- Sisters of Charity of St. Paul

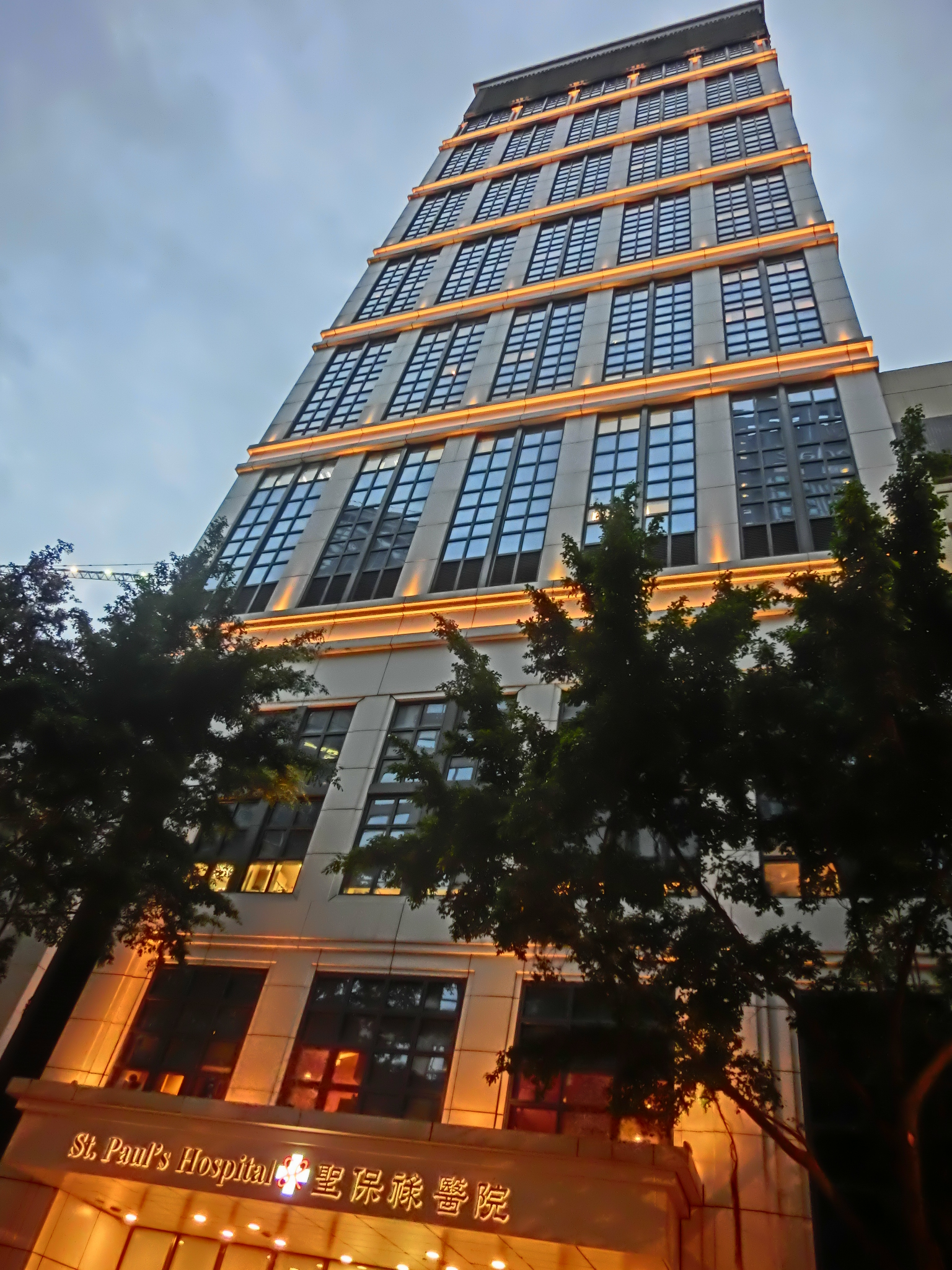
- St. Paul's Hospital Block A in November 2013

- Location within Hong Kong

Geography
- Location: 2 Eastern Hospital Road, Causeway Bay, Hong Kong
- Coordinates: 22°16′42″N 114°11′18″E

Organisation
- Care system: Private
- Type: District General
- Religious affiliation: Roman Catholic

Services
- Emergency department: No Accident & Emergency
- Beds: ~400

History
- Founded: 1 January 1898; 128 years ago

Links
- Website: www.stpaul.org.hk
- Lists: Hospitals in Hong Kong

St. Paul's Hospital
- Traditional Chinese: 聖保祿醫院
Transcriptions
Yue: Cantonese
- Yale Romanization: Sing bóu luhk yī yuhn
- Jyutping: Sing3 bou2 luk6 ji1 jyun6

St. Paul's Hospital (Chinese: 聖保祿醫院; SPH) is a Roman Catholic hospital in Causeway Bay on Hong Kong Island of Hong Kong.

== Naming ==
The hospital is colloquially known as the French Hospital (Chinese: 法國醫院)

== History ==
The hospital grew out of the caring activities undertaken by the Sisters of the Roman Catholic Christian order St. Paul de Chartres for the poor and underprivileged of the Wan Chai and Happy Valley areas of Hong Kong Island, which commenced in the mid-19th century after the order had first established itself in the then British colony.

Today St Paul's Hospital is a modern and well-established hospital located in the Causeway Bay area of Hong Kong Island. It has more than 400 beds and offers a very wide range of specialisations.

In 1940, a companion hospital, St. Teresa's Hospital, was founded by the Pauline Sisters.

St Paul's Hospital is a member of Hong Kong Private Hospitals Association.

St Paul's Hospital is surveyed and accredited bi-annually by QHA Trent Accreditation Scheme of the United Kingdom, a major international healthcare accreditation group.

== See also ==
- St. Teresa's Hospital
- List of hospitals in Hong Kong
- International healthcare accreditation
