= Argyle Street Camp =

Prisoner-of-war camp in Hong Kong during World War II

- Kowloon, Hong Kong in British Hong Kong

Site information
- Type: Prisoner-of-war camp
- Condition: Demolished in 1992

Location
- Coordinates: 22.3251°N 114.1848°E

Site history
- Built for: Refugees

Argyle Street Camp was a Japanese World War II prisoner-of-war camp in Kowloon, Hong Kong, which primarily held officer prisoners.

== World War II ==
Built by the Hong Kong government as a refugee camp before the war as North Point Camp and Ma Tau Chung Camp, it began life as a POW camp soon after Kowloon and the New Territories were abandoned to the Japanese.

In January 1942 it was emptied, with the POWs moving to Shamshuipo, North Point, and Ma Tau Chung Camps. However, after a number of escapes by POW officers and other ranks from Shamshuipo, Argyle Street was re-opened in mid-1942 as an officers' camp. In 1944 the officers were moved instead to Camp 'N' at Shamshuipo, and the Indian POWs from Ma Tau Chung Camp took up residence.

== After World War II ==
After the Japanese surrender, Argyle Street Camp became a centre for displaced people returning to Hong Kong. Later still, it was a camp for refugees reaching Hong Kong from other parts of South East Asia. The camp started accommodating Vietnamese refugees in June 1979, with a planned capacity of 20,000.

Today there are no memorials of any kind on the site of the camp, which is just to the south of St Teresa's Hospital.

== See also ==
- Japanese occupation of Hong Kong
- List of Japanese-run internment camps during World War II
- Second Sino-Japanese War
- Argyle Street, Hong Kong
- Stanley Internment Camp
