= Notre Dame College (Hong Kong) =

Catholic secondary school in Ma Tau Wai, Hong Kong

- Motto in English: Diligence Fidelity Piety
- Type: Private Catholic Non-profit Coeducational secondary education institution
- Established: 1967
- Religious affiliation: Roman Catholic
- Location: 51 Shing Tak Street, Ma Tau Wai, Kowloon, Hong Kong
- Colors: Green and White
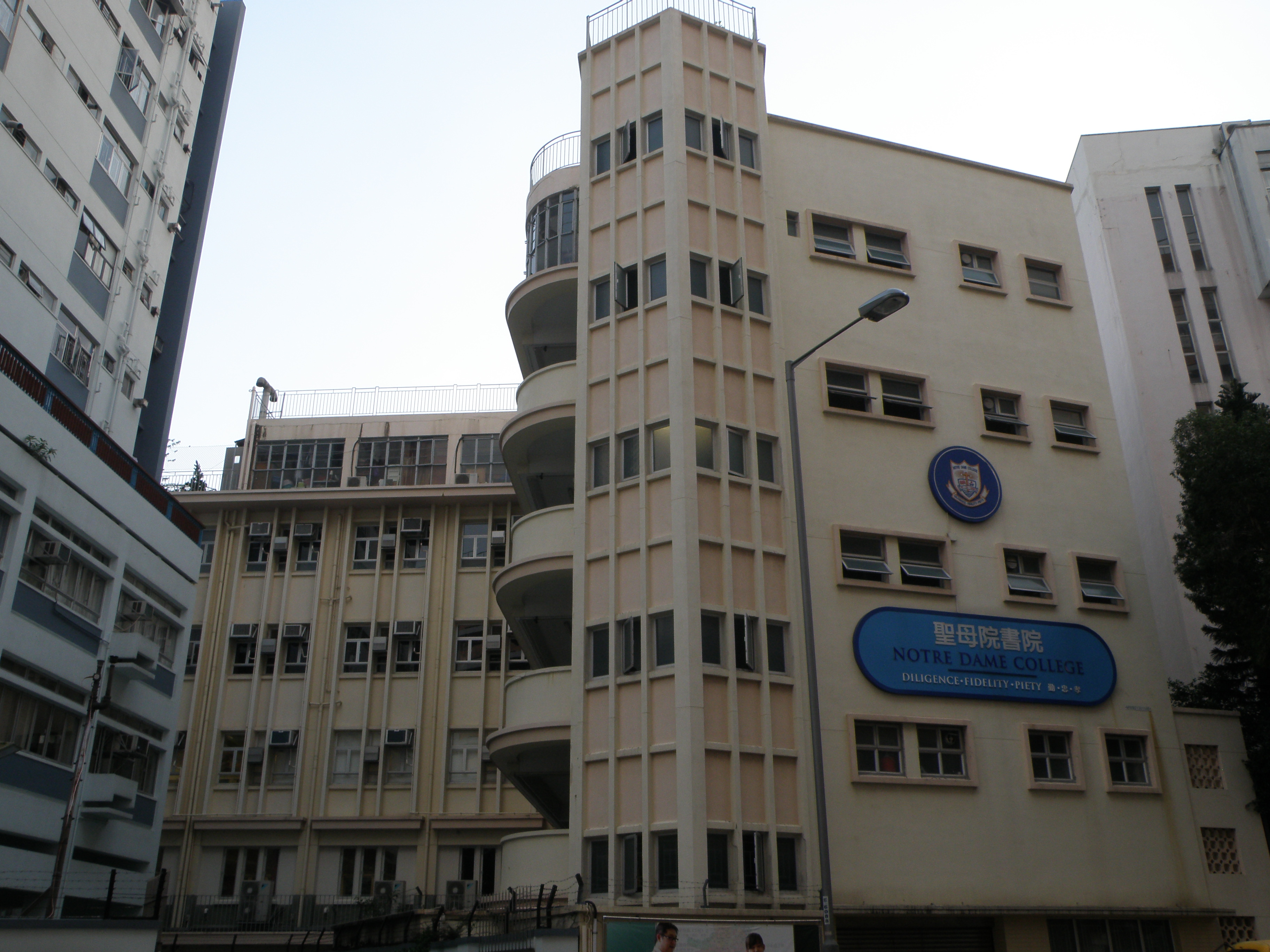

Chinese name
- Traditional Chinese: 聖母院書院
- Simplified Chinese: 聖母院书院
Transcriptions
Standard Mandarin
- Hanyu Pinyin: Shèngmǔyuàn Shūyuàn

Notre Dame College is a Catholic secondary school in Ma Tau Wai, Hong Kong. It serves years secondary 1-6 and was established in 1967.
