= Ma Tau Wai Road =

Road in Kowloon, Hong Kong

- Traditional Chinese: 馬頭圍道
- Simplified Chinese: 马头围道
Transcriptions
Standard Mandarin
- Hanyu Pinyin: Mǎtóu Wéi Dào
Yue: Cantonese
- Jyutping: maa5 tau4 wai4 dou6

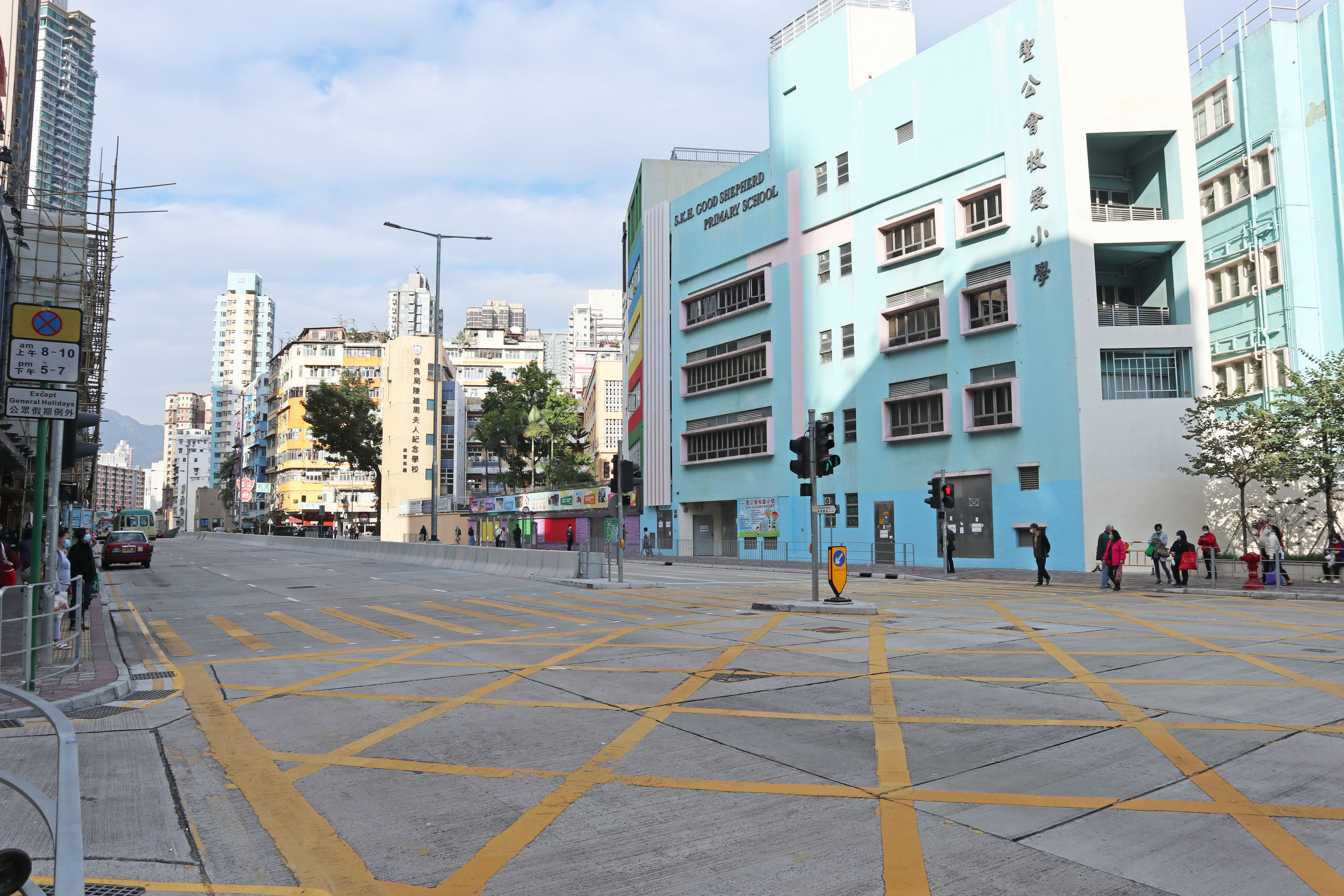
Ma Tau Wai Road in To Kwa Wan

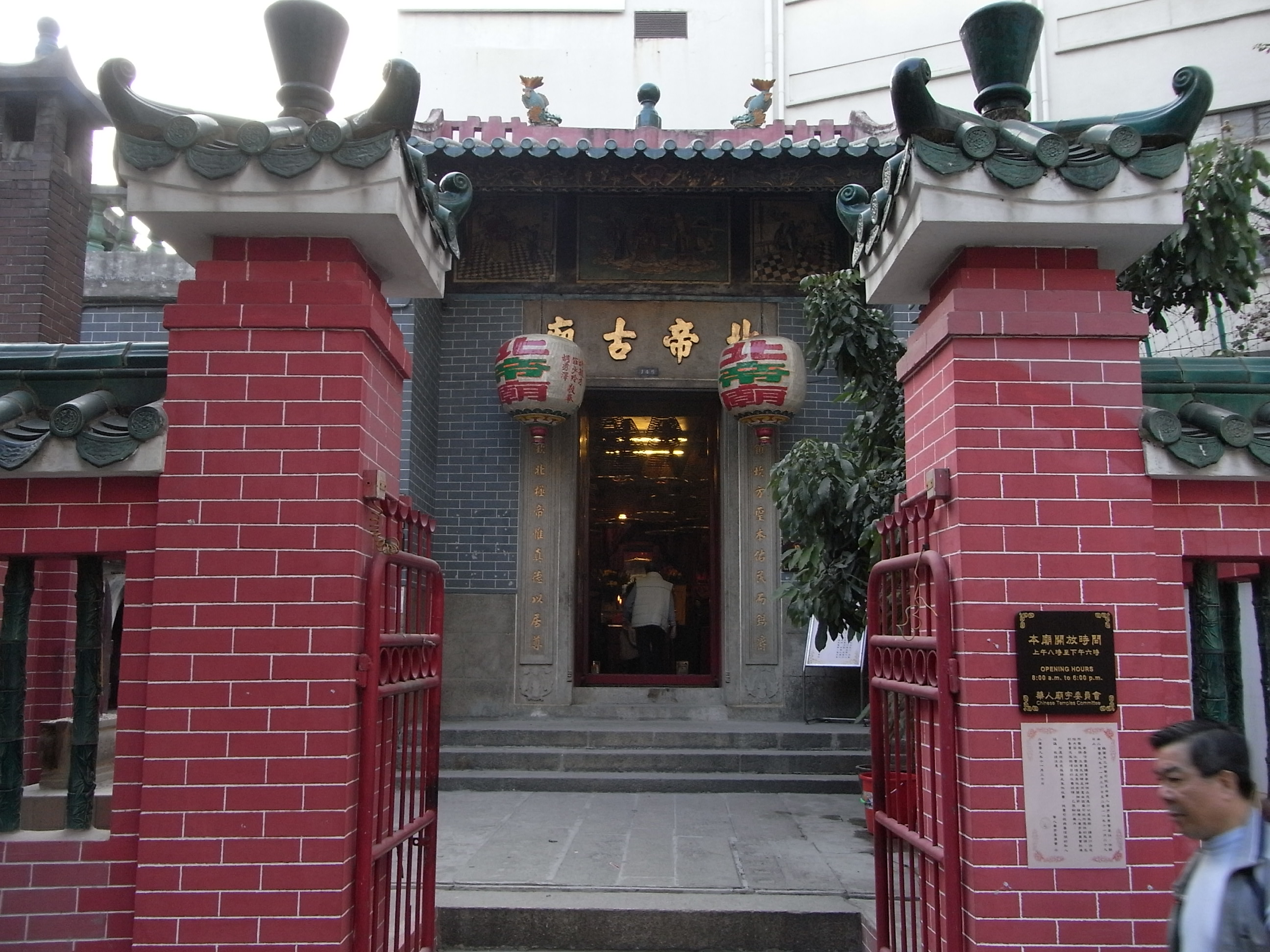
Pak Tai Temple along Ma Tau Wai Road.

Ma Tau Wai Road (Chinese: 馬頭圍道) is a main road in Kowloon City District, Kowloon, Hong Kong.

== History ==
Named after Ma Tau Wai, Ma Tau Wai Road was the southern section of the original Kowloon City Road. The northern section was named after Ma Tau Chung as Ma Tau Chung Road. There is a new Kowloon City Road that connects to Kai Tak Tunnel (formerly known as Airport Tunnel).

== Features ==
A Pak Tai Temple is located along Ma Tau Wai Road. Pak Tai temples are dedicated to Pak Tai (北帝 "North Deity" in Cantonese). This one was built in 1929 and is managed by the Chinese Temples Committee.

The two stretches of Ma Tai Wai Road, formerly interconnected, were separated on 17 October 1965 with the northern stretch connected to Chatham Road North, and the southern stretch to To Kwa Wan Road.
