= Ma Tau Chung Camp =

World War II internment camp in Hong Kong

Ma Tau Chung Camp Chinese: 馬頭涌戰俘營
- Internment camp
- Coordinates: 22°19′N 114°11′E
- Location: Ma Tau Chung, Hong Kong
- Operated by: Japan
- Original use: Refugee camp
- First built: 1941
- Operational: By 1944
- Inmates: Prisoners of war

Ma Tau Chung Camp (Chinese: 馬頭涌戰俘營) was an internment camp in Ma Tau Chung, Hong Kong during the Japanese Occupation of Hong Kong during World War II.

== Overview ==
The camp was built around 1941, originally as a refugee camp, as North Point Camp and Argyle Street Camp. It was located on parts of today's Ma Tau Chung Road (馬頭涌道) and Ma Tau Wai Estate.

The camp was closed in 1944 when the remaining Indian POWs moved back to Argyle Street Camp. It was later re-opened as the Ma Tau Wai Camp (馬頭圍戰俘營), holding third country national civilians.

== See also ==
- List of Japanese-run internment camps during World War II
