= St. Teresa's Hospital =

- Sisters of Charity of St. Paul
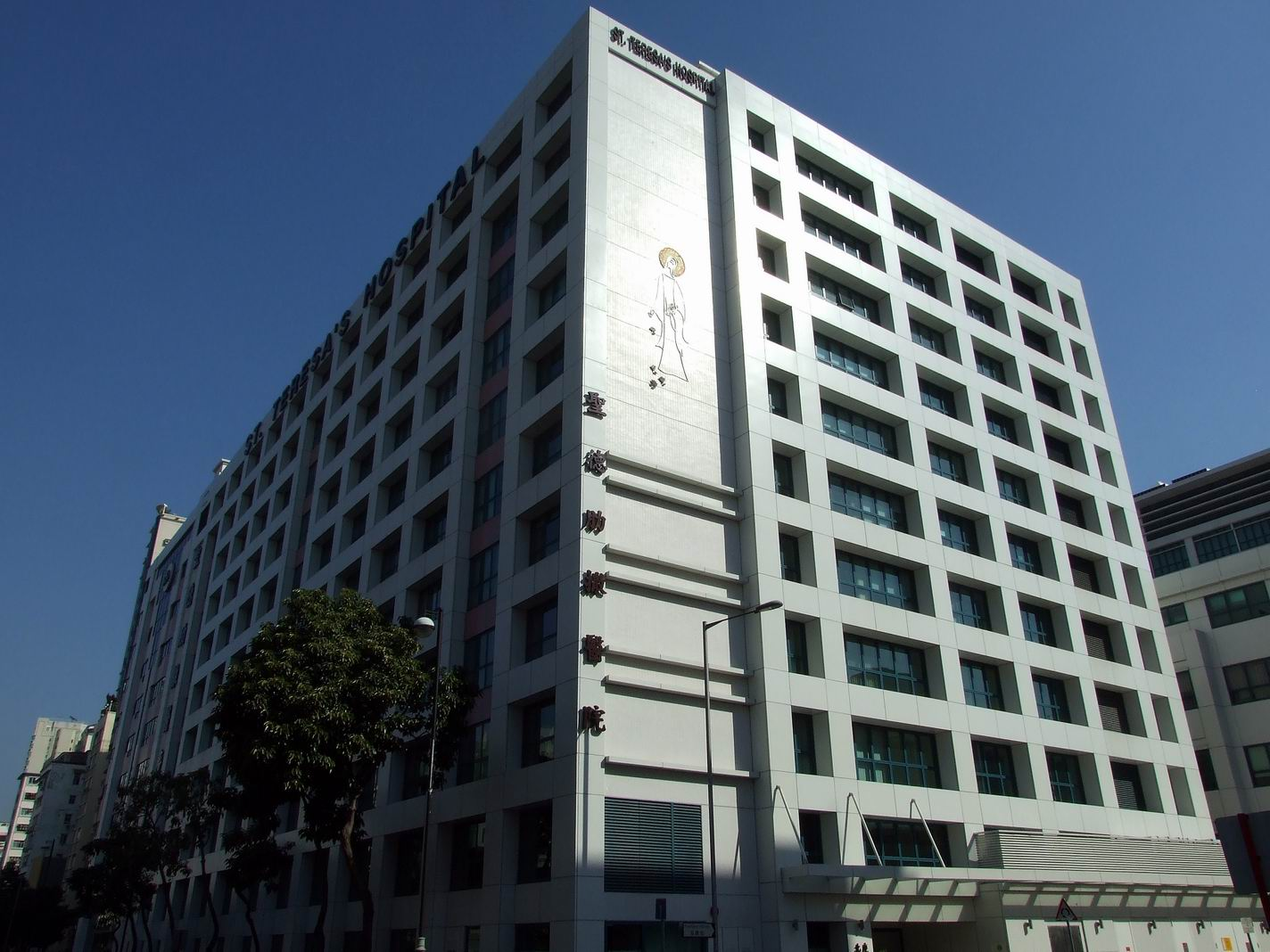
- St. Teresa's Hospital in November 2007

- Location within Hong Kong

Geography
- Location: 327 Prince Edward Road West, Kowloon City District, Hong Kong
- Coordinates: 22°19′35″N 114°11′05″E

Organisation
- Care system: Private (Catholic)
- Type: District General
- Religious affiliation: Roman Catholic

Services
- Emergency department: No Accident & Emergency
- Beds: 1,050

Helipads
- Helipad: No

History
- Founded: 1940; 86 years ago

Links
- Website: www.sth.org.hk
- Lists: Hospitals in Hong Kong

St. Teresa's Hospital
- Traditional Chinese: 聖德肋撒醫院
Transcriptions
Yue: Cantonese
- Yale Romanization: Sing dāk lahk saat yī yuhn
- Jyutping: Sing3 dak1 lak6 saat3 ji1 jyun6

St. Teresa's Hospital (Chinese: 聖德肋撒醫院; STH) is the largest nonprofit Roman Catholic charitable hospital in Kowloon, Hong Kong. It is located at 327 Prince Edward Road West.

== History ==
St Paul's Hospital in Causeway Bay had grown out of the caring activities undertaken by the Sisters of the Roman Catholic Christian order St. Paul de Chartres for the poor and underprivileged of the Wan Chai and Happy Valley areas of Hong Kong Island, which commenced in the mid-19th century after the order had first established itself in the then British colony.

To provide geographically closer services for the people of Kowloon on the opposite side of Victoria Harbour, the Pauline Sisters founded St Teresa's Hospital in 1940. It is sometimes known locally as the "French Hospital" (Chinese: 法國醫院), or "Kowloon French Hospital" (Chinese: 九龍法國醫院) to distinguish it from St. Paul's Hospital in Hong Kong Island, which is also known colloquially as the "French Hospital". The location of the hospital was next to the demolished Ma Tau Wai, an indigenous village that the modern-day area was named after. (Note: The official address of the hospital did not mention Ma Tau Wai or that the hospital is located within Kowloon City District.)

St Teresa's has 1,050 beds and offers a very wide range of specialisations. The hospital is a member of the Hong Kong Private Hospitals Association.

St Teresa's Hospital is surveyed and accredited bi-annually by QHA Trent Accreditation of the United Kingdom, a major international healthcare accreditation group.

== School of Nursing ==
From 1969 to 2002, Saint Teresa's had a School of Nursing for Pupil Nurses (General Nurse). The school reopened in 2005 with a two-year programme, accredited by the Hong Kong Nursing Council, to train Enrolled Nurses on a practical and theoretical level. After completing the training, graduates are eligible for enrollment with the Hong Kong Nursing Council as a general Enrolled Nurse (Licensed practical nurse).

== See also ==
- List of hospitals in Hong Kong
- International healthcare accreditation
