= Ma Tau Wai =

Residential area of Kowloon region, Hong Kong

Coordinates: 22.32351°N 114.18646°E

- Traditional Chinese: 馬頭圍
- Simplified Chinese: 马头围
Transcriptions
Standard Mandarin
- Hanyu Pinyin: Mǎtóu Wéi
Yue: Cantonese
- Jyutping: maa5 tau4 wai4

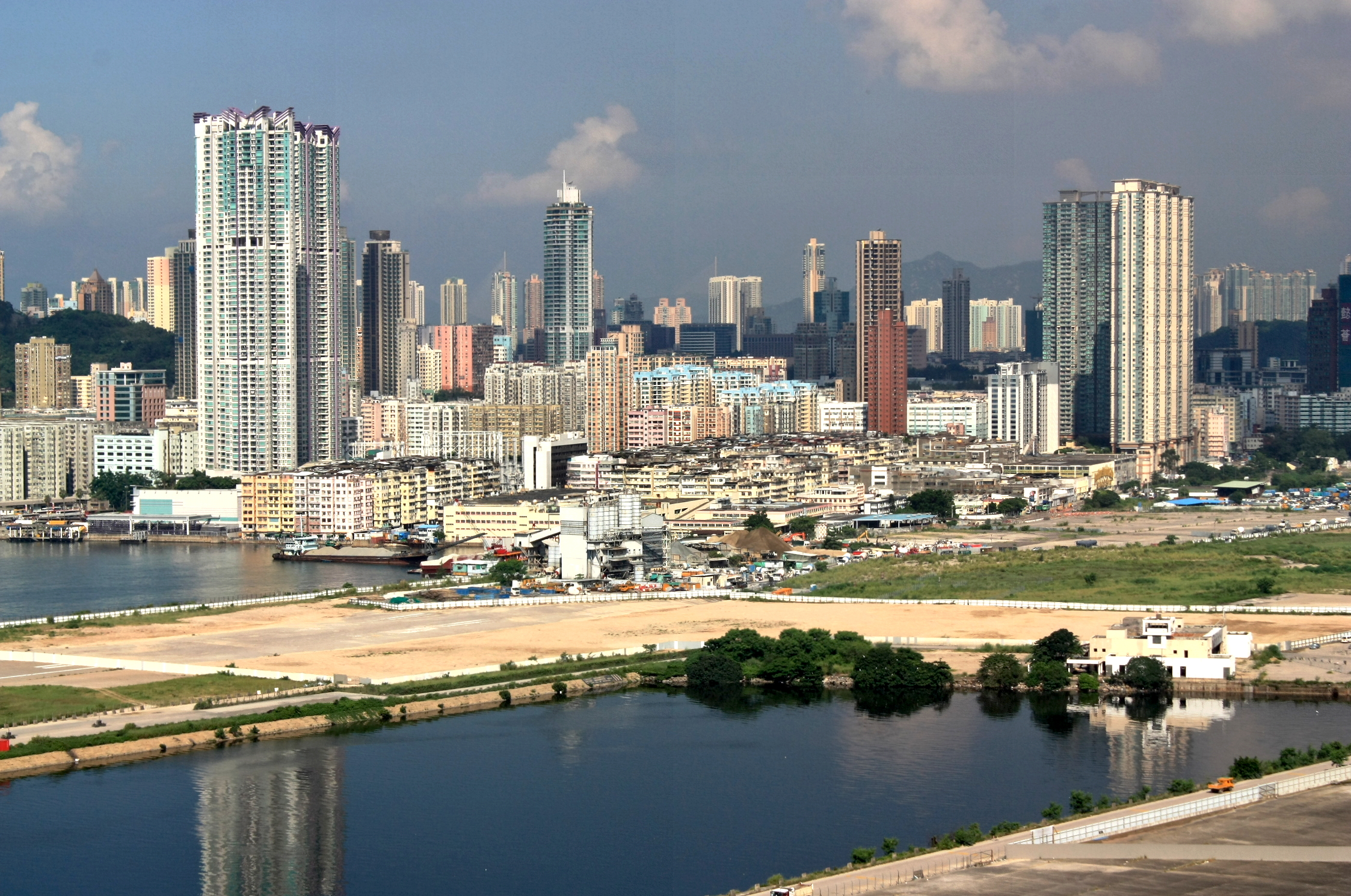
Ma Tau Kok (foreground) and Ma Tau Wai (background)

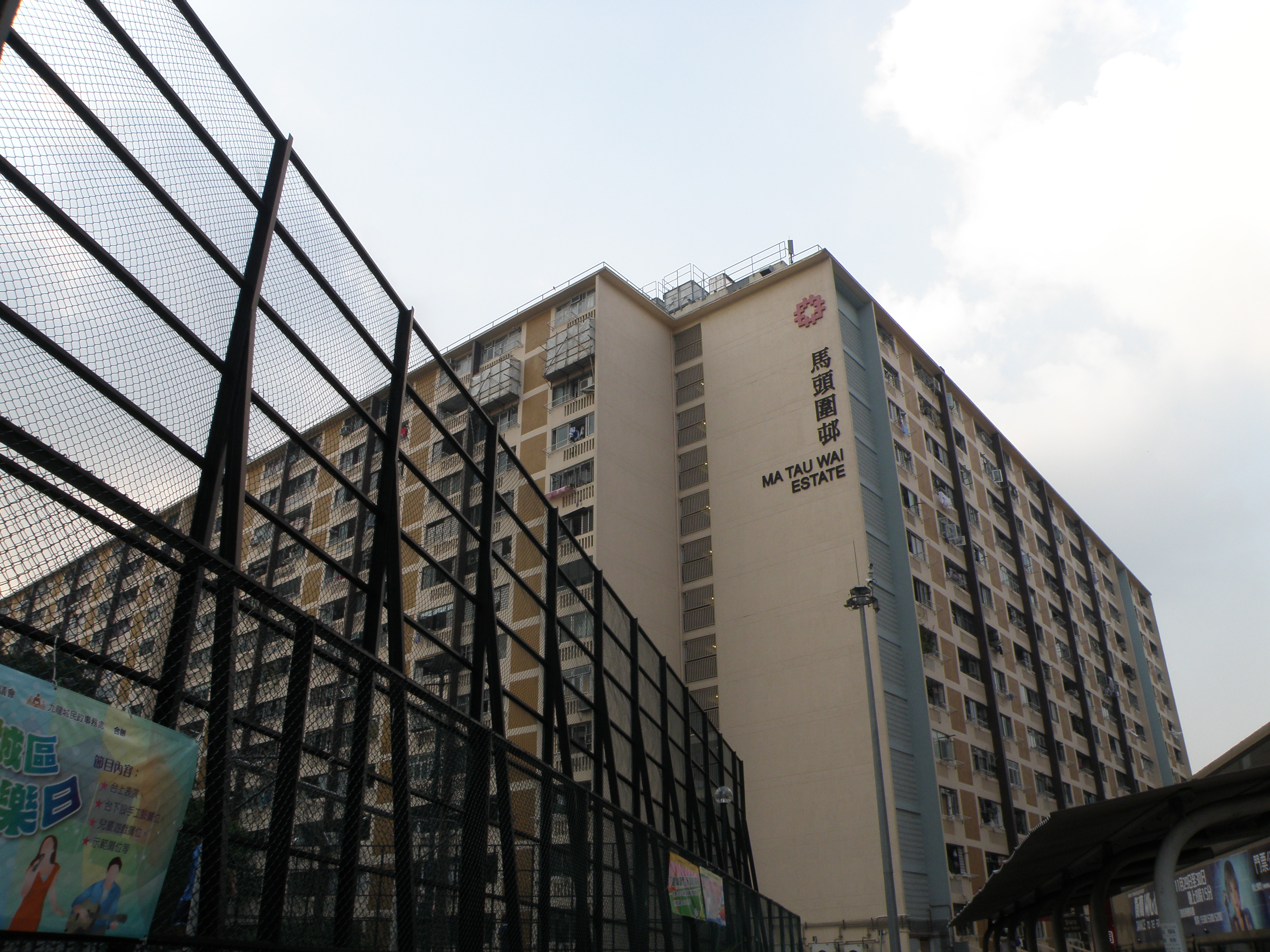
Ma Tau Wai Estate

Ma Tau Wai (Chinese: 馬頭圍, originally 碼頭圍, historically 古瑾圍) is an area in the Kowloon City District, Kowloon, Hong Kong. It was originally a walled village (Cantonese: 圍; Wai) between present-day Argyle Street and Prince Edward Road West, east of present-day St. Teresa's Hospital.

The area of Ma Tau Wai is not as well-defined as the original village, as the geographic features have been lost.

The public housing estate Ma Tau Wai Estate is named after the area / the original village.

== Other landmark of the areas ==
Hong Kong's Notre Dame College is in Ma Tau Wai.

New Asia College, one of three founding colleges of the Chinese University of Hong Kong, was located near Tin Kwong Road (天光道) and Farm Road. After the college moved to Ma Liu Shui, Sha Tin, New Asia Middle School was founded at the former campus.

== See also ==
- Ma Tau Chung
- Ma Tau Kok
