= Hong Kong =

Special administrative region of China

Coordinates: 22°18′N 114°12′E

Hong Kong 香港
- Special administrative region
- Hong Kong Special Administrative Region of the People's Republic of China 中華人民共和國香港特別行政區
- Flag Emblem

- Location of Hong Kong (red) within China (beige)
- Sovereign state: China
- British possession: 26 January 1841
- Treaty of Nanking: 29 August 1842
- Convention of Peking: 24 October 1860
- New Territories lease: 9 June 1898
- Imperial Japanese occupation: 25 December 1941 to 30 August 1945
- Re-designated as a British Dependent Territory: 1 January 1981
- Sino-British Joint Declaration: 19 December 1984
- Handover to China: 1 July 1997
- Administrative centre: Tamar
- Largest district by population: Sha Tin
- Official languages: Chinese (Note: No specific variety of Chinese is official in the territory. Residents predominantly speak Cantonese, the de facto regional standard.); English (Note: For most government use, documents written using Traditional Chinese characters are authoritative over ones inscribed with Simplified Chinese characters. English shares equal status with Chinese in all official proceedings.)
- Regional and indigenous languages: Cantonese; Weitou dialect; Hakka; Tanka
- Official scripts: Traditional Chinese; English alphabet
- Ethnic groups (2021): 91.6% Chinese; 2.7% Filipino; 1.9% Indonesian; 0.8% White; 1.4% South Asian (of which 0.6% Indian; 0.4% Nepalese; 0.3% Pakistani; 0.1% Other South Asian); 2% other
- Demonym(s): Hongkonger; Hongkongese
- Government: Devolved executive-led government within a unitary state
  - Chief Executive: John Lee
  - Chief Secretary: Eric Chan
  - Council President: Starry Lee
  - Chief Justice: Andrew Cheung
- Legislature: Legislative Council

National representation
  - National People's Congress: 36 deputies
  - Chinese People's Political Consultative Conference: 203 delegates

Area
  - Total: 2,754.97 km^{2} (1,063.70 sq mi) (168th)
  - Water (%): 59.70 (1,640.62 km^{2}; 633.45 sq mi)
  - Land: 1,114.35 km^{2} (430.25 sq mi)
- Highest elevation (Tai Mo Shan): 957 m (3,140 ft)
- Lowest elevation (South China Sea): 0 m (0 ft)

Population
  - 2023 estimate: ▲7,498,100 (102nd)
  - 2021 census: ▲7,413,070
  - Density: 6,801/km^{2} (17,614.5/sq mi) (4th)
- GDP (PPP): 2026 estimate
  - Total: ▲$647.727 billion (49th)
  - Per capita: ▲$85,843 (16th)
- GDP (nominal): 2026 estimate
  - Total: ▲$455.156 billion (41st)
  - Per capita: ▲$60,322 (21st)
- Gini (2024): ▲45.7 (Note: After adjustment for taxes and social transfers) medium
- HDI (2023): ▼0.955 very high · 8th
- Currency: Hong Kong dollar (HK$) (HKD)
- Time zone: UTC+08:00 (HKT)
- Date format: dd/mm/yyyy yyyy年mm月dd日
- Mains electricity: 220 V–50 Hz
- Calling code: +852
- ISO 3166 code: HK; CN-HK
- Internet TLD: .hk; .香港
- Number plate prefixes: 粤Z (Note: Issued by Guangdong Provincial Public Security Department in Guangzhou for the cross-boundary local vehicles entering Mainland China.)
- Climate: Monsoon-influenced humid subtropical climate (Cwa)

Hong Kong (Note: US: /ˈhɒŋkɒŋ/ or UK: /hɒŋˈkɒŋ/; Chinese: 香港; Jyutping: Hoeng1 gong2; Cantonese Yale: Hēunggóng, Cantonese: [hœ́ːŋ.kɔ̌ːŋ]; Officially the Hong Kong Special Administrative Region of the People's Republic of China (abbr. Hong Kong SAR or HKSAR; Chinese: 中華人民共和國香港特別行政區; pinyin: Xiānggǎng Tèbié Xíngzhèngqū; Cantonese Yale: Hēunggóng Dahkbiht Hàhngjingkēui).; Legally Hong Kong, China in international treaties and organisations.) is a special administrative region of China. Situated on China's southern coast just south of Shenzhen, it consists of Hong Kong Island, Kowloon, and the New Territories. With 7.5 million residents in a 1,114-square-kilometre (430 sq mi) territory, Hong Kong is the fourth-most densely populated region in the world.

Hong Kong was established as a colony of the British Empire after the Qing dynasty ceded Hong Kong Island in 1841–1842 as a result of losing the First Opium War. The colony expanded to the Kowloon Peninsula in 1860 and was further extended when the United Kingdom obtained a 99-year lease of the New Territories in 1898. Hong Kong was occupied by Japan from 1941 to 1945 during World War II. The territory was handed over from the United Kingdom to China in 1997. Hong Kong maintains separate governing and economic systems from those of mainland China under the principle of one country, two systems. (Note: However, decisions made by the Standing Committee of the National People's Congress override any territorial judicial process. Furthermore, the State Council may enforce national law in the region under specific circumstances.)

Originally an area of farming and fishing villages, Hong Kong is now one of the world's most significant financial centres. Hong Kong is the world's third-ranked global financial centre behind New York City and London, the ninth-largest exporter, and the eighth-largest importer in the world. Its currency, the Hong Kong dollar, is the ninth-most traded currency globally. Home to the third-highest number of billionaires of any city in the world, Hong Kong has the second-largest number of ultra high-net-worth individuals. The city has one of the highest per capita incomes, although severe income inequality still exists among the population.

Hong Kong has the most skyscrapers of any city in the world. Housing is consistently in high demand, making the city of Hong Kong the most expensive residential property market in the world and one of the most expensive cities in the world. It is also one of the most visited cities in the world.

Hong Kong is a highly developed territory and has a Human Development Index (HDI) of 0.955, ranking eighth in the world, and is currently the only place in Asia to be in the top ten. Hong Kong is categorized as an Alpha+ city by the Globalization and World Cities Research Network. The city has the highest life expectancy in the world, and has a public transport usage exceeding 90 percent.

== Etymology ==
Hong Kong
- "Hong Kong" in Chinese characters
- Chinese: 香港
- Jyutping: hoeng1 gong2
- Cantonese Yale: Hēunggóng; or; Hèunggóng
- Literal meaning: "Fragrant Harbour"
Transcriptions
Standard Mandarin
- Hanyu Pinyin: Xiānggǎng
- Bopomofo: ㄒㄧㄤ ㄍㄤˇ
- Gwoyeu Romatzyh: Shianggaang
- Wade–Giles: Hsiang^{1}-kang^{3}
- Yale Romanization: Syānggǎng
- IPA: [ɕjáŋ.kàŋ]
Wu
- Wugniu: shian^{1} kaon^{3}
- IPA: Shanghainese: [ɕiã˥ kɑ̃˧]
Hakka
- Romanization: Hiong^{1}gong^{3}
Yue: Cantonese
- Yale Romanization: Hēunggóng; or; Hèunggóng
- Jyutping: hoeng1 gong2
- Canton Romanization: Hêng^{1}gong^{2}
- IPA: [hœ́ːŋ.kɔ̌ːŋ]; or; [hœ̂ːŋ.kɔ̌ːŋ]
Southern Min
- Hokkien POJ: Hiong-káng

Hong Kong Special Administrative Region
- Traditional Chinese: 香港特別行政區; (香港特區)
- Simplified Chinese: 香港特别行政区; (香港特区)
- Jyutping: hoeng1 gong2 dak6 bit6 hang4 zing3 keoi1; (hoeng1 gong2 dak6 keoi1)
- Cantonese Yale: Hēunggóng Dahkbiht Hàhngjingkēui; (Hēunggóng Dahkkēui); or; Hèunggóng Dahkbiht Hàhngjingkēui; (Hèunggóng Dahkkēui)
Transcriptions
Standard Mandarin
- Hanyu Pinyin: Xiānggǎng Tèbié Xíngzhèngqū; (Xiānggǎng Tèqū)
- Bopomofo: ㄒㄧㄤ ㄍㄤˇ; ㄊㄜˋ ㄅㄧㄝˊ; ㄒㄧㄥˊ ㄓㄥˋ ㄑㄩ; (ㄒㄧㄤ ㄍㄤˇ ㄊㄜˋ ㄑㄩ)
- Gwoyeu Romatzyh: Shianggaang Tehbye Shyngjenqchiu; (Shianggaang Tehchiu)
- Wade–Giles: Hsiang^{1}-kang^{3} Tʻe^{4}-pieh^{2} Hsing^{2}-cheng^{4}-chʻü^{1}; (Hsiang^{1}-kang^{3} Tʻe^{4}-chʻü^{1})
- Yale Romanization: Syānggǎng Tèbyé Syíngjèngchyū; (Syānggǎng Tèchyū)
- IPA: [ɕjáŋ.kàŋ tʰɤ̂.pjě ɕǐŋ.ʈʂə̂ŋ.tɕʰý]; ([ɕjáŋ.kàŋ tʰɤ̂.tɕʰú])
Wu
- Wugniu: shian^{1} kaon^{3} deq^{8} biq^{8} yin^{2} tsen^{5} chiu^{1}; (shian^{1} kaon^{3} deq^{8} chiu^{1})
- IPA: Shanghainese: [ɕiã˥ kɑ̃˧ dəʔ˩ biɪʔ˨ ɦin˩ tsən˦ tɕy˩]; Shanghainese: [ɕiã˥ kɑ̃˧ dəʔ˩ tɕy˦]
Hakka
- Romanization: Hiong^{1}gong^{3} Tet^{6}piet^{6} Hang^{2}zin^{4}ki^{1}
Yue: Cantonese
- Yale Romanization: Hēunggóng Dahkbiht Hàhngjingkēui; (Hēunggóng Dahkkēui); or; Hèunggóng Dahkbiht Hàhngjingkēui; (Hèunggóng Dahkkēui)
- Jyutping: hoeng1 gong2 dak6 bit6 hang4 zing3 keoi1; (hoeng1 gong2 dak6 keoi1)
- Canton Romanization: Hêng^{1}gong^{2} Deg^{6}bid^{6} Heng^{4}jing^{3}kêu^{1}
- IPA: [hœ́ːŋ.kɔ̌ːŋ tɐ̀k̚.pìːt̚ hɐ̏ŋ.tsēŋ.kʰɵ́y]; ([hœ́ːŋ.kɔ̌ːŋ tɐ̀k̚.kʰɵ́y]); or; [hœ̂ːŋ.kɔ̌ːŋ tɐ̀k̚.pìːt̚ hɐ̏ŋ.tsēŋ.kʰɵ́y]; ([hœ̂ːŋ.kɔ̌ːŋ tɐ̀k̚.kʰɵ́y])
Southern Min
- Hokkien POJ: Hiong-káng Te̍k-pia̍t Hêng-chèng-khu; (Hiong-káng Te̍k-khu)

The name of the territory, first romanised as "He-Ong-Kong" in 1780, originally referred to a small inlet located between Aberdeen Island and the southern coast of Hong Kong Island. Aberdeen was an initial point of contact between British sailors and local fishermen. Although the source of the romanised name is unknown, it is generally believed to be an early phonetic rendering of the Cantonese (or Tanka Cantonese) phrase hēung góng. The name translates as "fragrant harbour" or "incense harbour". "Fragrant" may refer to the sweet taste of the harbour's freshwater influx from the Pearl River or to the odour from incense factories lining the coast of northern Kowloon. The incense was stored near Aberdeen Harbour for export before Victoria Harbour was developed. Sir John Davis (the second colonial governor) offered an alternative origin; Davis said that the name derived from "Hoong-keang" ("red torrent"), reflecting the colour of soil over which a waterfall on the island flowed.

The simplified name Hong Kong was frequently used by 1810. The name was also commonly written as the single word Hongkong until 1926, when the government officially adopted the two-word name. Some corporations founded during the early colonial era still keep this name, including Hongkong Land, Hongkong Electric Company, Hongkong and Shanghai Hotels, and the Hongkong and Shanghai Banking Corporation (HSBC).

== History ==
=== Prehistory and Imperial China ===
The earliest known human traces in what is now Hong Kong date to 35,000-39,000 years ago during the Paleolithic period. The claim is based on an archaeological investigation in Wong Tei Tung in the Sai Kung Peninsula in 2003. The archaeological work revealed knapped stone tools from deposits dated by optical luminescence dating.

During the Middle Neolithic period, about 6,000 years ago, the region had been widely occupied by humans. Neolithic to Bronze Age Hong Kong settlers were semi-coastal people. Early inhabitants are believed to have been Austronesians in the Middle Neolithic period, and later the Yue people. As hinted by the archaeological works in Sha Ha, Sai Kung, rice cultivation had been introduced since the Late Neolithic period. Bronze Age Hong Kong featured coarse pottery, hard pottery, quartz and stone jewelry, as well as small bronze implements.

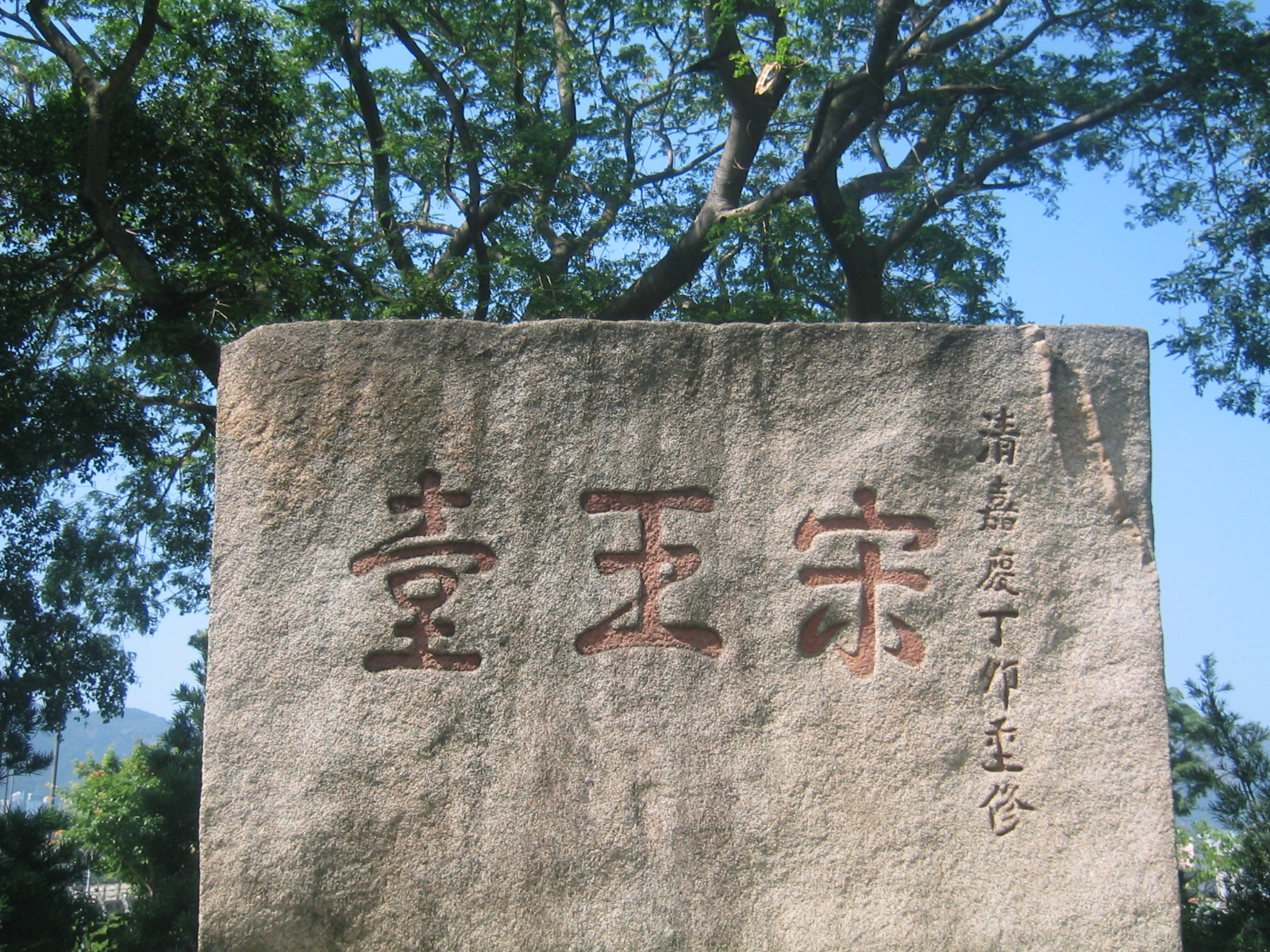
Sung Wong Toi

The Qin dynasty incorporated the Hong Kong area into China for the first time in 214 BCE, after conquering the indigenous Baiyue. The region was consolidated under the Nanyue kingdom (a predecessor state of Vietnam) after the Qin collapse, and it was recaptured by China after the Han conquest. During the Mongol conquest of China in the 13th century, the southern Song court was briefly located in modern-day Kowloon City (the Sung Wong Toi site) before its final defeat in the 1279 Battle of Yamen by the Yuan dynasty. By the end of the Yuan dynasty, seven large families had settled in the region and owned most of the land. Settlers from nearby provinces migrated to Kowloon throughout the Ming dynasty.

The earliest known European visitor was Portuguese explorer Jorge Álvares, who arrived in 1513. Portuguese merchants established a trading post called Tamão in Hong Kong waters and began regular trade with southern China. Although the traders were expelled after military clashes in the 1520s, Portuguese-Chinese trade relations were re-established by 1549. Portugal acquired a permanent lease for Macau in 1887.

After the Qing conquest, maritime trade was banned under the Haijin policies. From 1661 to 1683, the population of most of the area that forms present-day Hong Kong was cleared under the Great Clearance, turning the region into a wasteland. The Kangxi Emperor lifted the maritime trade prohibition, allowing foreigners to enter Chinese ports in 1684. Qing authorities established the Canton System in 1757 to regulate trade more strictly, restricting non-Russian ships to the port of Canton. Although European demand for Chinese commodities like tea, silk, and porcelain was high, Chinese interest in European manufactured goods was insignificant, so that Chinese goods could only be bought with precious metals. To reduce the trade imbalance, the British sold large amounts of Indian opium to China. Faced with a drug crisis, Qing officials pursued ever more aggressive actions to halt the opium trade.

=== British colony ===
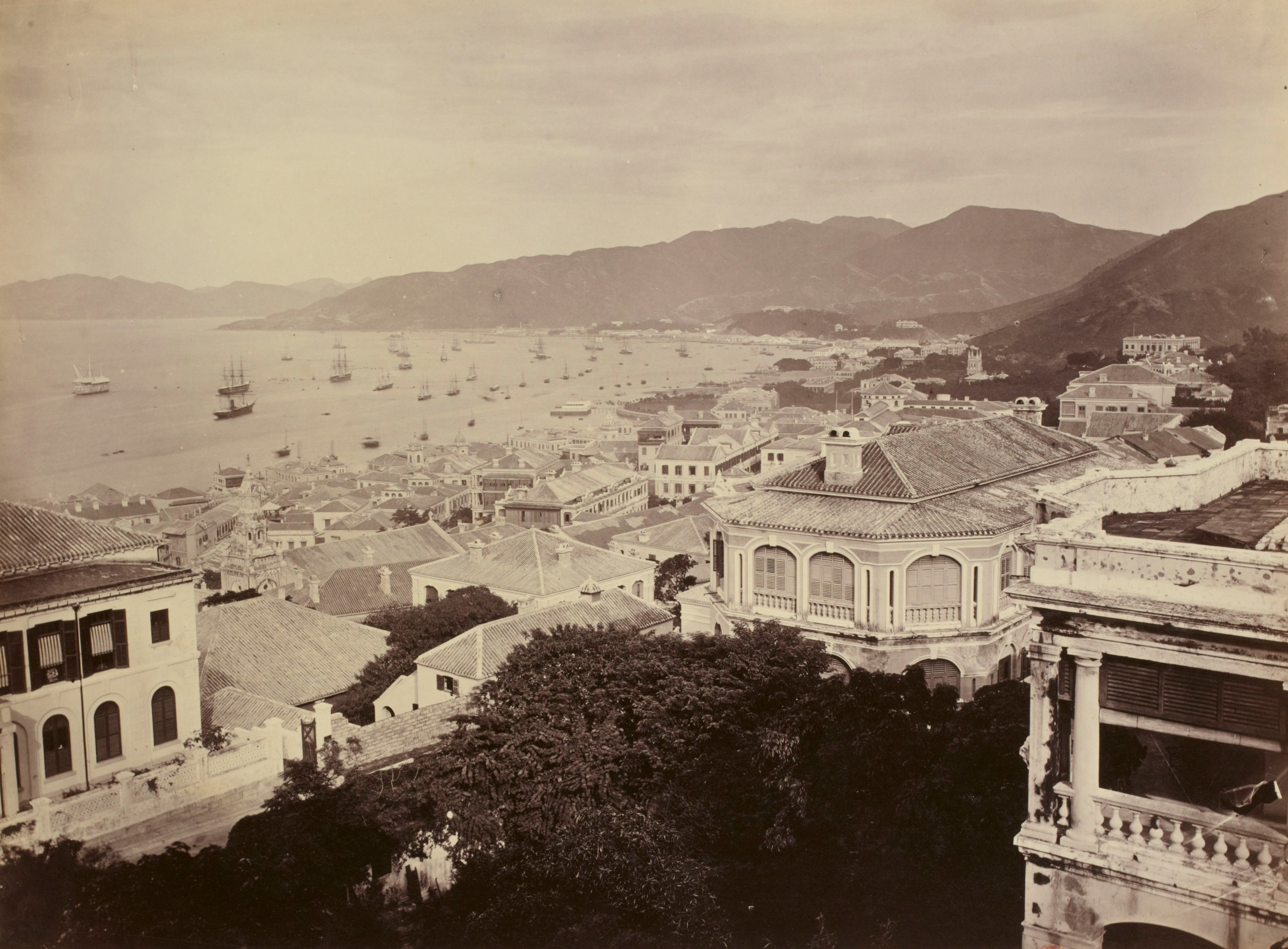
Hong Kong in 1868, photograph by John Thomson

In 1839, the Daoguang Emperor rejected proposals to legalise and tax opium and ordered imperial commissioner Lin Zexu to eradicate the opium trade. The commissioner destroyed opium stockpiles and halted all foreign trade, triggering a British military response and the First Opium War. The Qing surrendered early in the war and ceded Hong Kong Island in the Convention of Chuenpi, signed by Charles Elliot and Qishan. British forces began controlling Hong Kong shortly after the signing of the convention, on 26 January 1841. However, both countries were dissatisfied and did not ratify the agreement. After more than a year of further hostilities, Hong Kong Island was formally ceded in perpetuity to the United Kingdom in the 1842 Treaty of Nanking.

Administrative infrastructure was quickly built by early 1842, but piracy, disease, and hostile Qing policies initially prevented the government from attracting commerce. Conditions on the island improved during the Taiping Rebellion in the 1850s, when many Chinese refugees, including wealthy merchants, fled mainland turbulence and settled in the colony. Further tensions between the British and Qing over the opium trade escalated into the Second Opium War. The Qing were again defeated and were forced to give up Kowloon Peninsula and Stonecutters Island in the Convention of Peking. By the end of this war, Hong Kong had evolved from a transient colonial outpost into a major entrepôt. Rapid economic improvement during the 1850s attracted foreign investment, as potential stakeholders became more confident in Hong Kong's future.

The colony was further expanded in 1898 when the United Kingdom obtained a 99-year lease of the New Territories. The University of Hong Kong was established in 1911 as the territory's first institution of higher education. Kai Tak Airport began operation in 1924, and the colony avoided a prolonged economic downturn after the 1925–26 Canton–Hong Kong strike. At the start of the Second Sino-Japanese War in 1937, Governor Geoffry Northcote declared Hong Kong a neutral zone to safeguard its status as a free port. The colonial government prepared for a possible attack, evacuating all British women and children in 1940. The Imperial Japanese Army attacked Hong Kong on 8 December 1941, the same morning as its attack on Pearl Harbor. Hong Kong was occupied by Japan for almost four years before the British resumed control on 30 August 1945.

The flag of British Hong Kong from 1959 to 1997

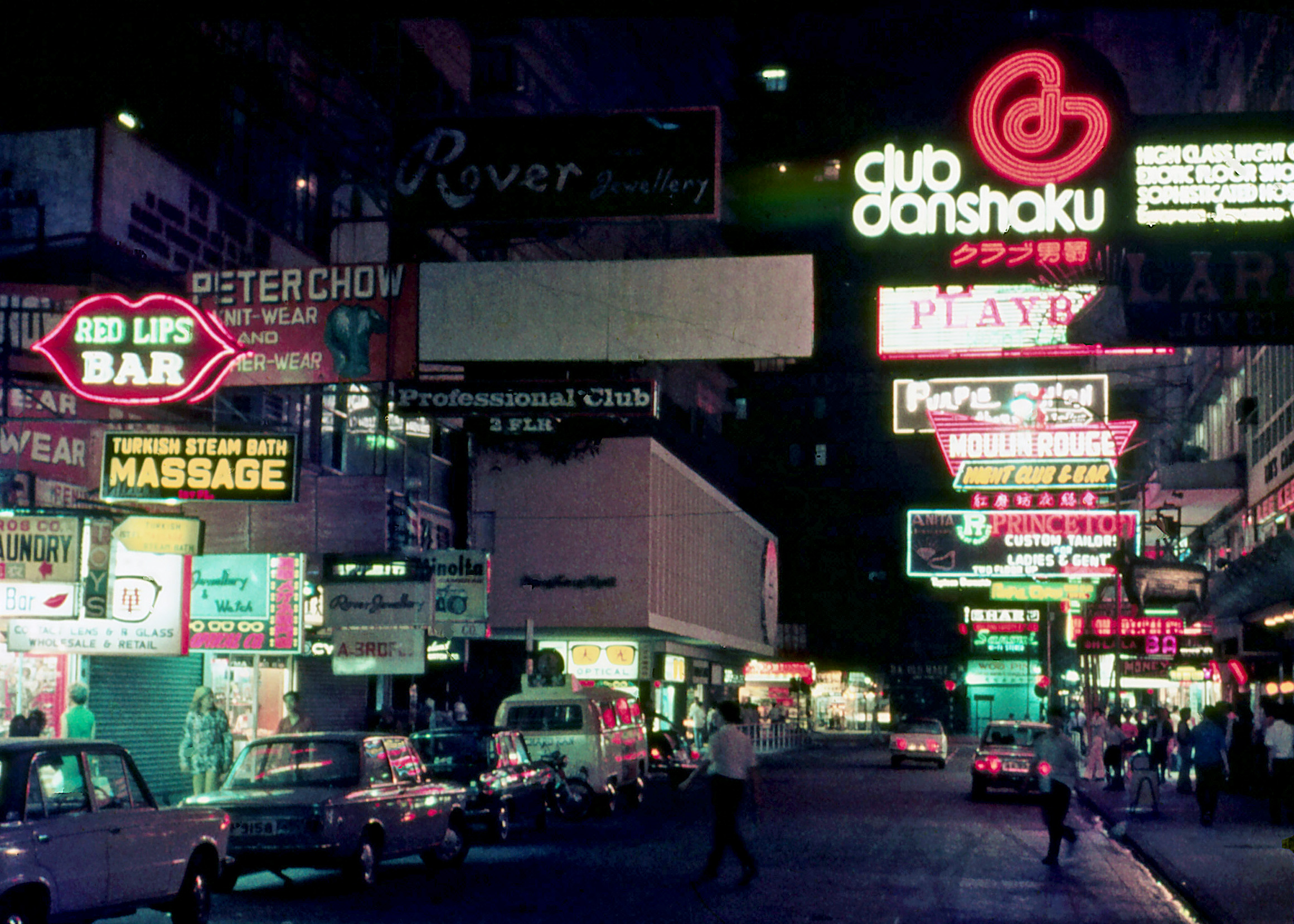
Peking Road in Tsim Sha Tsui in 1971

Its population rebounded quickly after the war, as skilled Chinese migrants fled from the Chinese Civil War and more refugees crossed the border when the Chinese Communist Party took control of mainland China in 1949. Hong Kong became the first of the Four Asian Tiger economies to industrialise during the 1950s. With a rapidly increasing population, the colonial government attempted reforms to improve infrastructure and public services. The public-housing estate programme, Independent Commission Against Corruption, and Mass Transit Railway were all established during the post-war decades to provide safer housing, integrity in the civil service, and more reliable transportation.

Nevertheless, widespread public discontent led to multiple protests from the 1950s to 1980s, including pro-Republic of China and pro-Chinese Communist Party demonstrations. In the 1967 Hong Kong riots, pro-PRC protestors clashed with the British colonial government. As many as 51 were killed, and 802 were injured in the violence, including dozens killed by the Royal Hong Kong Police via beatings and shootings.

Although the territory's manufacturing competitiveness gradually declined due to rising labour and property costs, it transitioned to a service-based economy. By the early 1990s, Hong Kong had established itself as a global financial centre and shipping hub.

=== Chinese special administrative region ===
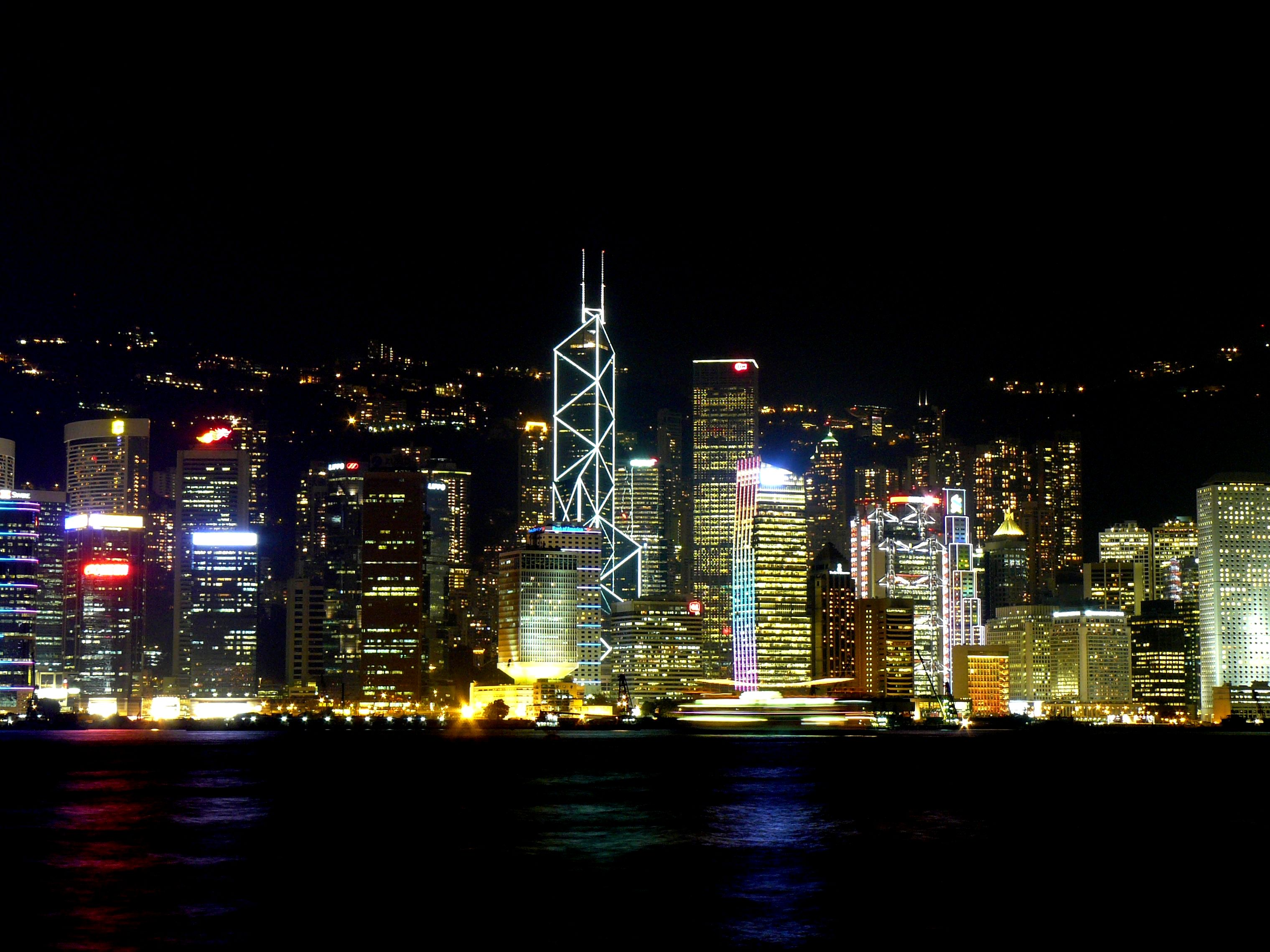
Victoria Harbour and Hong Kong Island, 2007

The colony faced an uncertain future as the end of the New Territories lease approached, and Governor Murray MacLehose raised the question of Hong Kong's status with Deng Xiaoping in 1979. Diplomatic negotiations with China resulted in the 1984 Sino-British Joint Declaration, in which the United Kingdom agreed to the handover of the colony in 1997, and China would guarantee Hong Kong's economic and political systems for 50 years after the handover. The impending handover triggered a wave of mass emigration as residents feared an erosion of civil rights, the rule of law, and quality of life. Over half a million people left the territory during the peak migration period, from 1987 to 1996. The Legislative Council became a fully elected legislature for the first time in 1995. It extensively expanded its functions and organizations throughout the last years of colonial rule. The handover of Hong Kong to China was at midnight on 1 July 1997, after 156 years of British rule.

Immediately after the handover, Hong Kong was severely affected by several crises. The Hong Kong government was forced to use substantial foreign exchange reserves to maintain the Hong Kong dollar's currency peg during the 1997 Asian financial crisis, and the recovery from this was muted by an H5N1 avian-flu outbreak and a housing surplus. This was followed by the 2003 SARS epidemic, during which the territory experienced its most serious economic downturn.

Chinese communists portrayed the return of Hong Kong as a key moment in the PRC's rise to great power status.

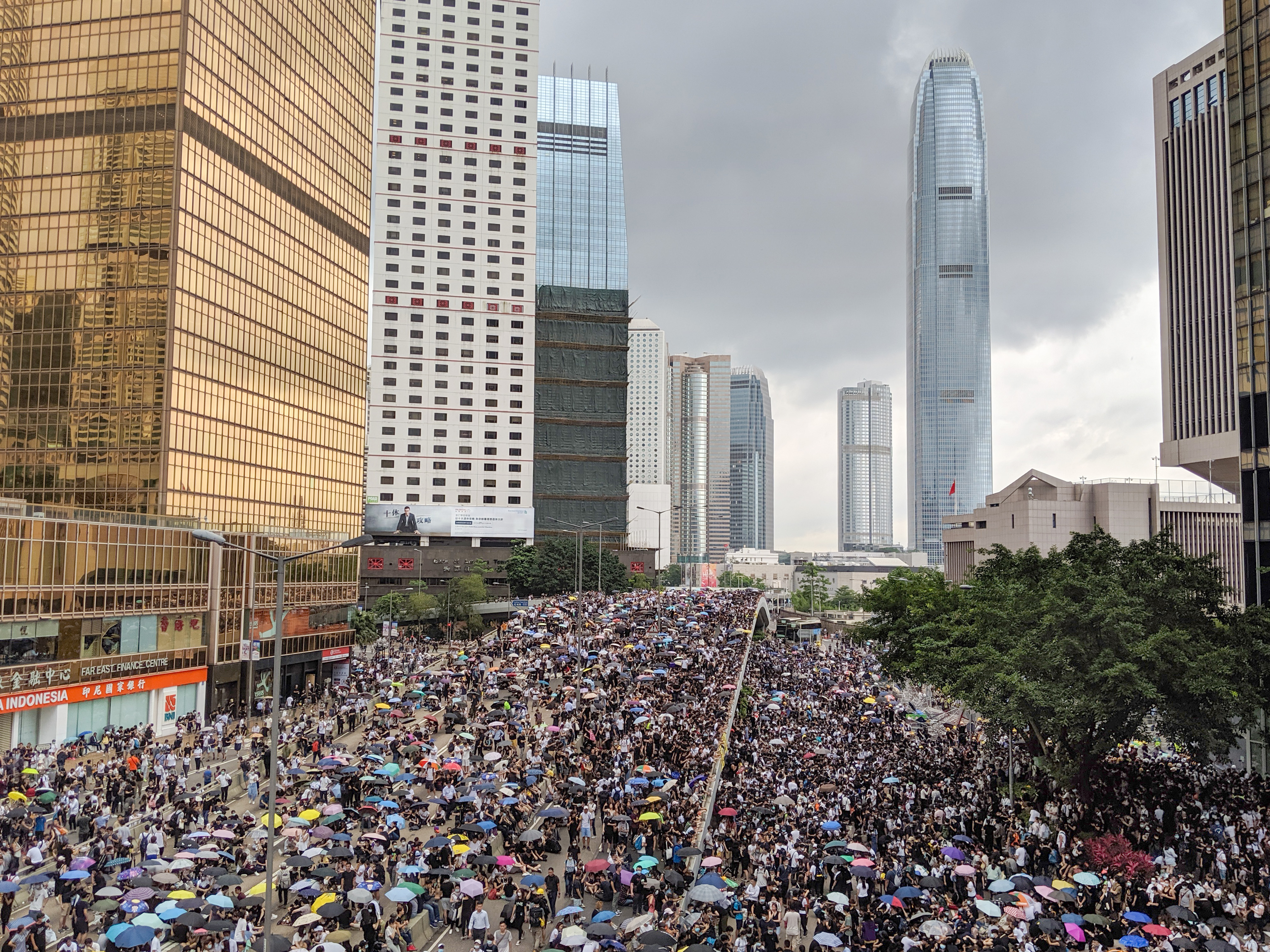
Hong Kong protests, August 2019

Political debates after the handover have centred around the region's democratic development and the Chinese central government's adherence to the "one country, two systems" principle. After the reversal of the last colonial era Legislative Council democratic reforms following the handover, the regional government unsuccessfully attempted to enact national security legislation pursuant to Article 23 of the Basic Law. The central government decision to implement nominee pre-screening before allowing chief executive elections triggered a series of protests in 2014 which became known as the Umbrella Revolution. Discrepancies in the electoral registry and disqualification of elected legislators after the 2016 Legislative Council elections and enforcement of national law in the West Kowloon high-speed railway station raised further concerns about the region's autonomy. In June 2019, mass protests erupted in response to a proposed extradition amendment bill permitting the extradition of fugitives to mainland China. The protests are the largest in Hong Kong's history, with organisers claiming to have attracted more than three million Hong Kong residents.

==== Following the 2019 protests ====
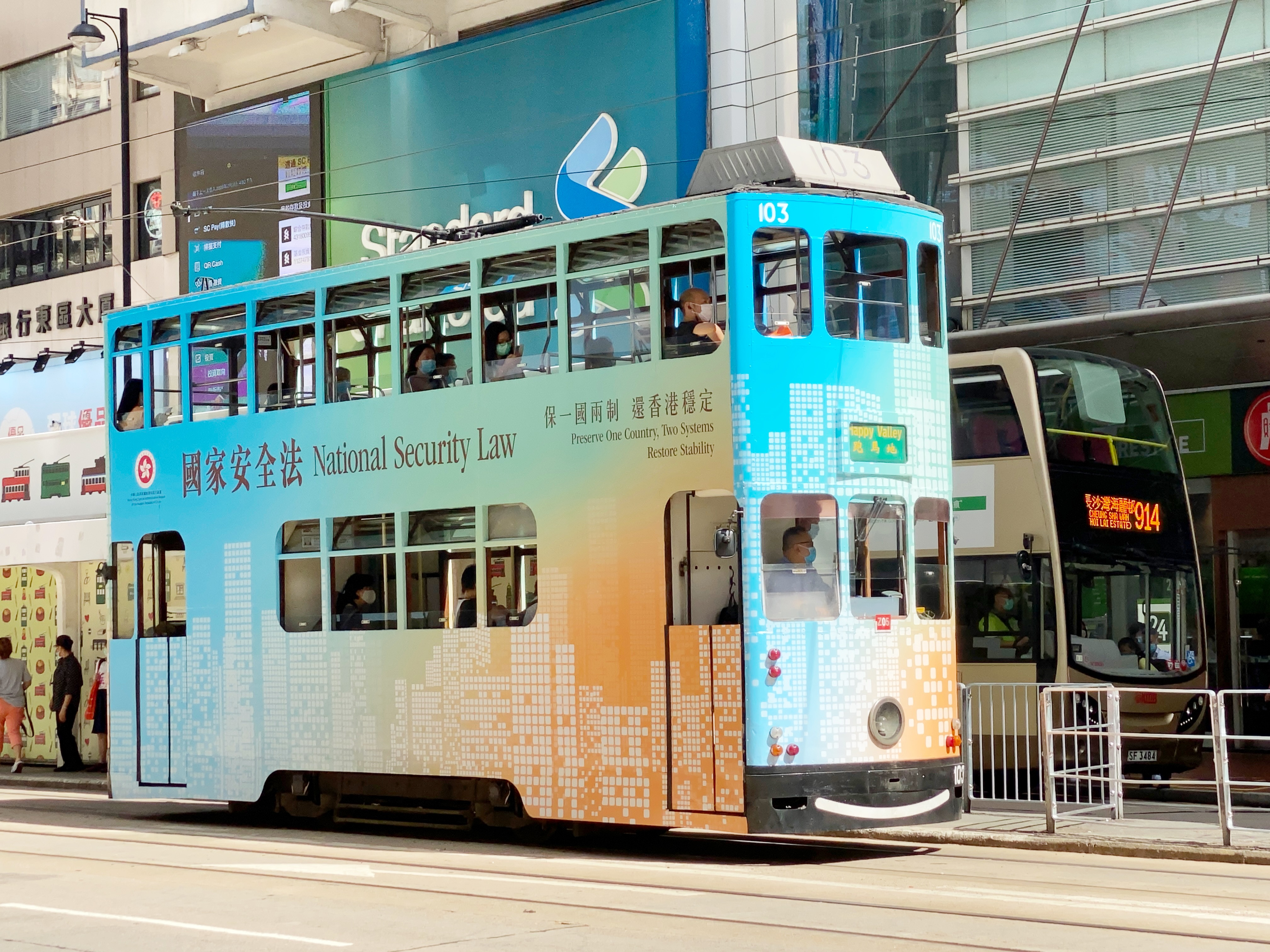
A tram with slogans promoting the National Security Law printed on it

The Hong Kong regional government and the Chinese central government responded to the protests with many administrative measures to quell dissent. In June 2020, the Legislative Council passed the National Anthem Ordinance, which criminalised "insults to the national anthem of China". The Chinese central government meanwhile enacted the Hong Kong national security law to help quell protests in the region. Nine months later, in March 2021, the Chinese central government introduced amendments to Hong Kong's electoral system, which included the reduction of directly elected seats in the Legislative Council and the requirement that all candidates be vetted and approved by a Beijing-appointed Candidate Eligibility Review Committee.

Since 2021, more than 170,000 Hongkongers have moved to the United Kingdom under the British National (Overseas) visa scheme. From late 2022, Hong Kong expanded its talent admission programmes to address labour shortages. By February 2026, these schemes had brought in over 530,000 workers and their families, mostly from mainland China.

In July 2023, Hong Kong's Legislative Council passed reforms slashing directly elected District Council seats and establishing a vetting committee for candidates.

In terms of international connectedness, as of 2024, the city was one of eight worldwide that was classified as an "Alpha+" city by the Globalization and World Cities Research Network.

== Government and politics ==
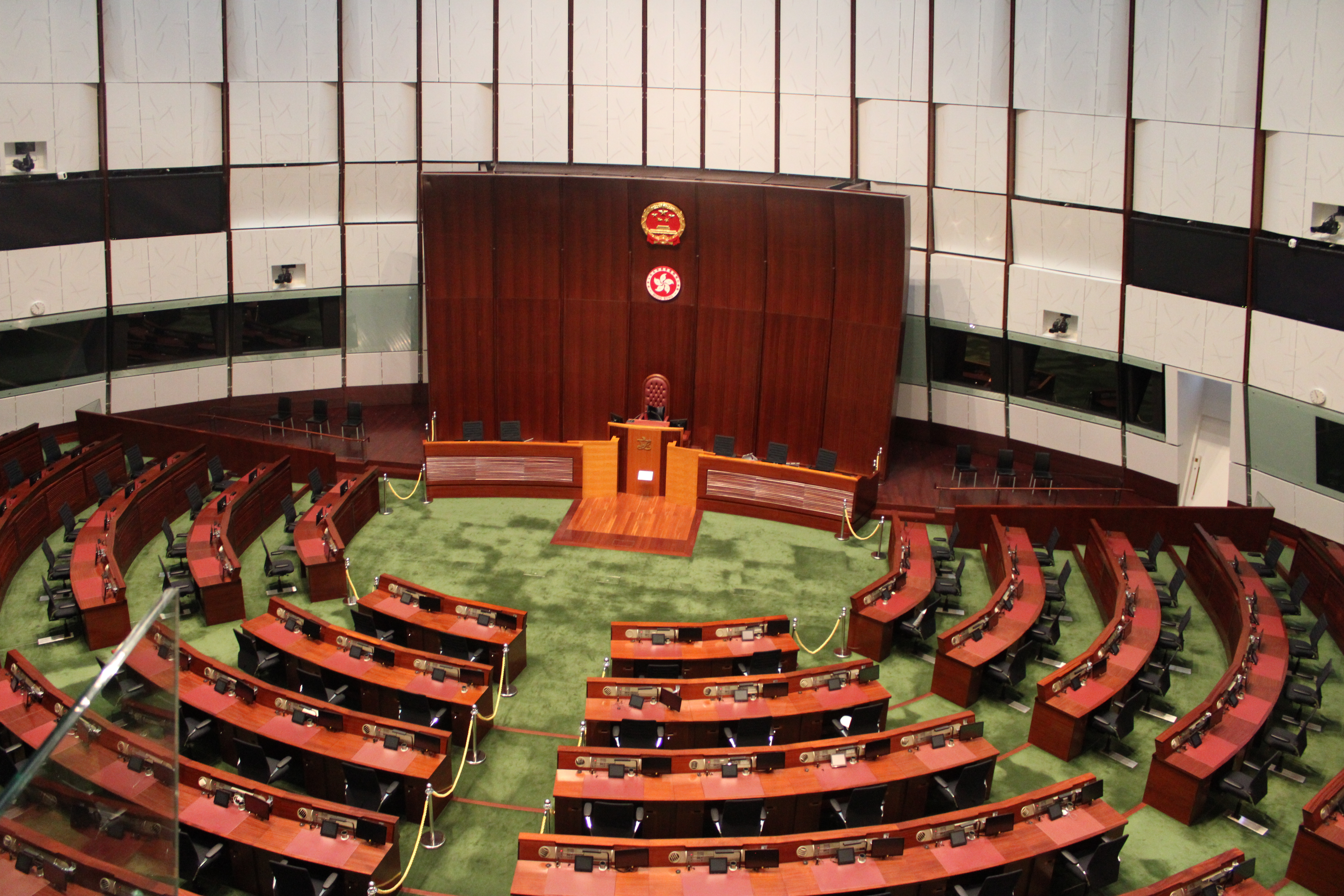
Since 2012, the legislature has met in the Tamar Legislative Council Complex.

Hong Kong is a special administrative region of China, with executive, legislative, and judicial powers devolved from the national government. The Sino-British Joint Declaration provided for economic and administrative continuity through the handover, resulting in an executive-led governing system largely inherited from the territory's history as a British colony. Under these terms and the "one country, two systems" principle, the Basic Law of Hong Kong is the regional constitution. The regional government is composed of three branches:

- Executive: As Hong Kong operates under an executive-led system, the Chief Executive is responsible for enforcing regional law, can force reconsideration of legislation, and appoints Executive Council members and principal officials. Acting with the Executive Council, the Chief Executive-in-Council can propose new bills, issue subordinate legislation, and has authority to dissolve the legislature. In states of emergency or public danger, the Chief Executive-in-Council is further empowered to enact any regulation necessary to restore public order.
- Legislature: The unicameral Legislative Council enacts regional law, approves budgets, and has the power to impeach a sitting chief executive.
- Judiciary: The Hong Kong Court of Final Appeal and lower courts interpret laws and overturn those inconsistent with the Basic Law. The chief executive appoints judges on the advice of a recommendation commission.

The chief executive is the head of government, serving for a maximum of two five-year terms; however, as of 2026, no chief executive has completed the maximum two five-year term limit. The State Council (led by the Premier of China) appoints the chief executive after nomination by the Election Committee, which is composed of 1500 business, community, and government leaders.

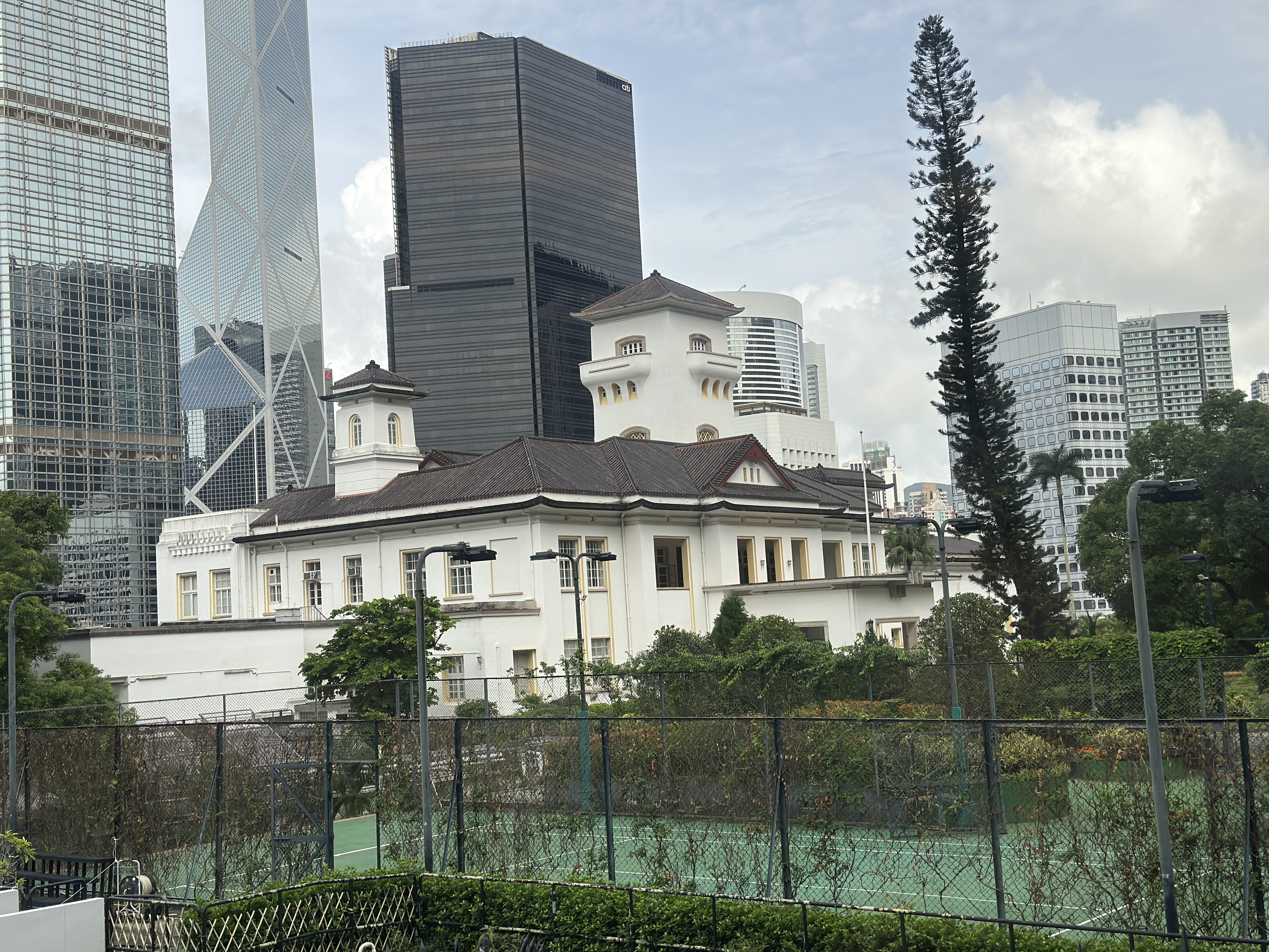
Hong Kong Government House

The Legislative Council has 90 members, each serving a four-year term. Twenty are directly elected from geographical constituencies, thirty represent functional constituencies (FC), and forty are locally chosen by an election committee consisting of representatives appointed by the Chinese central government. Thirty FC councillors are selected from limited electorates representing sectors of the economy or special interest groups. Geographical constituency elected members are chosen by single non-transferable vote (SNTV), yielding two candidates per GC. The 30 limited electorate functional constituencies fill their seats using first-past-the-post or instant-runoff voting.

Twenty-two political parties had representatives elected to the Legislative Council in the 2016 election. These parties have aligned themselves into three ideological groups: the pro-Beijing camp (the current government), the pro-democracy camp, and localist groups. However, by 2021, the pro-democracy camp and the localist groups lost all representation in the Legislative Council as a result of the 2021 electoral changes imposed by the National People's Congress, and since 2025 all 90 members of the Legislative Council have been from the pro-Beijing camp. The Chinese Communist Party does not have an official political presence in Hong Kong, and it does not contest local elections. Hong Kong is represented in the National People's Congress by 36 deputies chosen through an electoral college and 203 delegates in the National Committee of the Chinese People's Political Consultative Conference appointed by the central government.

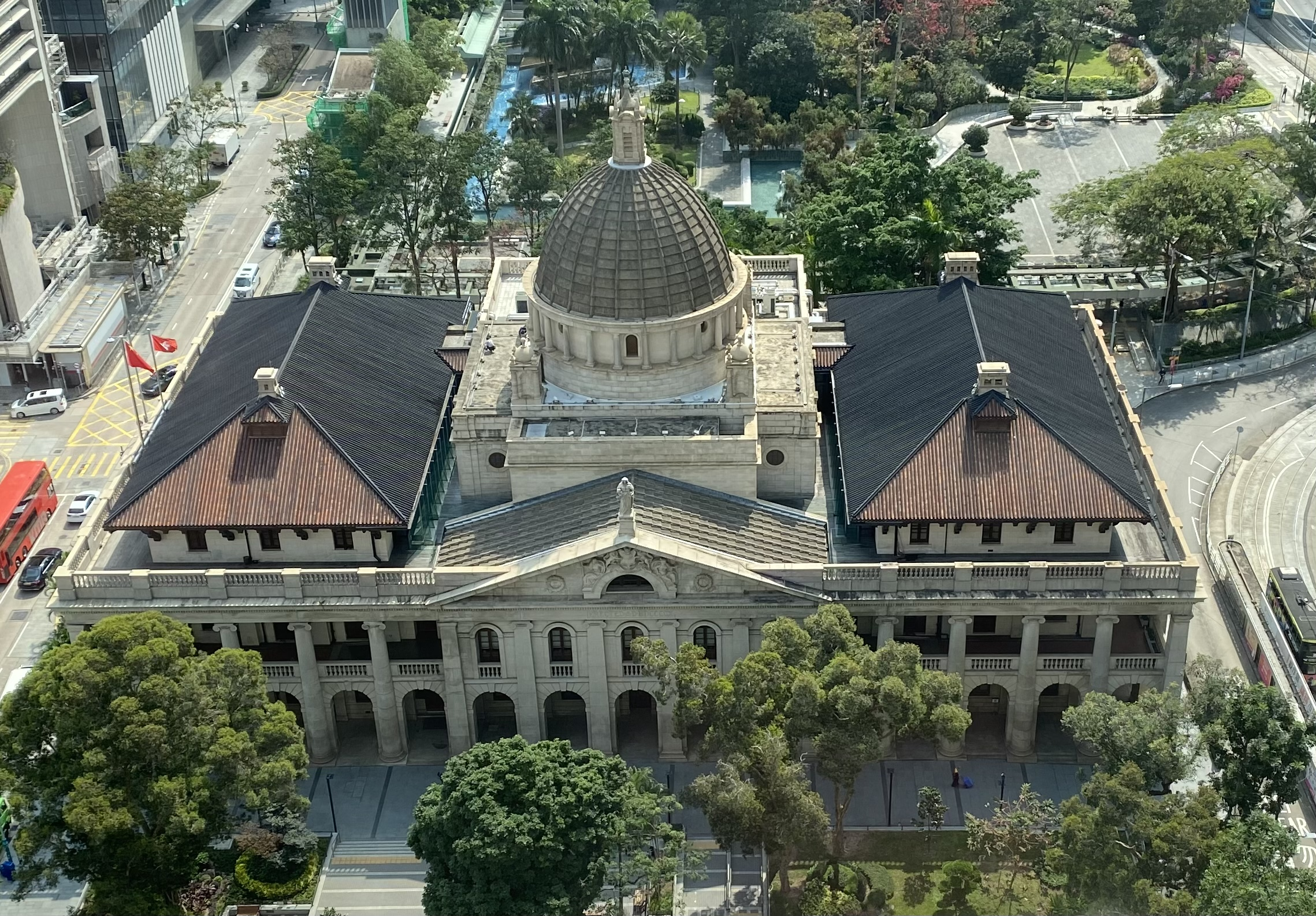
The Court of Final Appeal Building formerly housed the Supreme Court and the Legislative Council.

There are major differences between Hong Kong's legal system and the rest of China's. Its judicial system is based on common law, continuing the legal tradition established during British rule. Local courts may refer to precedents set in English law and overseas jurisprudence. However, mainland criminal procedure law applies to cases investigated by the Office for Safeguarding National Security of the CPG in the HKSAR. Interpretative and amending power over the Basic Law and jurisdiction over acts of state lie with the central authority, making regional courts ultimately subordinate to the mainland's socialist civil law system. Decisions made by the Standing Committee of the National People's Congress override any territorial judicial process. Furthermore, in circumstances where the Standing Committee declares a state of emergency in Hong Kong, the State Council may enforce national law in the region.

The territory's jurisdictional independence is most apparent in its immigration and taxation policies. The Immigration Department issues passports for Chinese nationals which differ from those of the mainland or Macau, and the region maintains a regulated border with the rest of the country. All travellers between Hong Kong, mainland China, and Macau must pass through border controls, regardless of nationality. Mainland Chinese residents do not have right of abode in Hong Kong and are subject to immigration controls. Public finances are handled separately from the national government, and taxes levied in Hong Kong do not fund the central authority.

The Hong Kong Garrison of the People's Liberation Army is responsible for the region's defence. Although the Chairman of the Central Military Commission is supreme commander of the armed forces, the regional government may request assistance from the garrison. Hong Kong residents are not required to perform military service, and current law has no provision for local enlistment. The garrison is composed entirely of non-Hongkongers.

The central government and Ministry of Foreign Affairs handle diplomatic matters, but Hong Kong retains the ability to maintain separate economic and cultural relations with foreign nations. The territory actively participates in the World Trade Organization, the Asia-Pacific Economic Cooperation forum, the International Olympic Committee, and many United Nations agencies. It holds membership in other international bodies including the World Health Organization. The regional government maintains trade offices in Greater China and other nations.

The imposition of the Hong Kong national security law by the central government in Beijing in June 2020 resulted in the suspension of bilateral extradition treaties by the United Kingdom, Canada, Australia, New Zealand, Finland, and Ireland. The United States ended its preferential economic and trade treatment of Hong Kong in July 2020 because it was no longer able to distinguish Hong Kong as a separate entity from the People's Republic of China. In 2024, the Safeguarding National Security Ordinance was passed by the Legislative Council to grant officials the power to prosecute crimes such as treason and insurrection. Critics state that this expansion will give more powers to crack down on opposition to the central government of China and the Hong Kong government as well as strike a lasting blow to the partial autonomy China had promised the city in the Sino-British Joint Declaration.

=== Administrative divisions ===
Hong Kong's administrative divisions are divided into three levels: Areas (區域), districts (地區), and sub-districts (分區). Hong Kong is administratively divided into three areas: Hong Kong Island, Kowloon, and the New Territories. They are further divided into 18 districts. The area of Hong Kong Island has four districts, the area of Kowloon has five districts, and the area of the New Territories has nine districts. Each district is represented by a district council. The district councils advise the government on local issues such as the provision of public facilities, the maintenance of community programmes, cultural promotion, and environmental policy.

As of 2024, there are a total of 470 district council seats, 88 of which are directly elected. In May 2023, the government proposed reforms to the District Council electoral system which significantly cut the number of directly elected seats from 452 to 88, and total seats from 479 to 470. A requirement that district council candidates be vetted and approved by the District Council Eligibility Review Committee was also implemented. The Legislative Council approved the reforms in July 2023.

=== Political reforms and sociopolitical issues ===
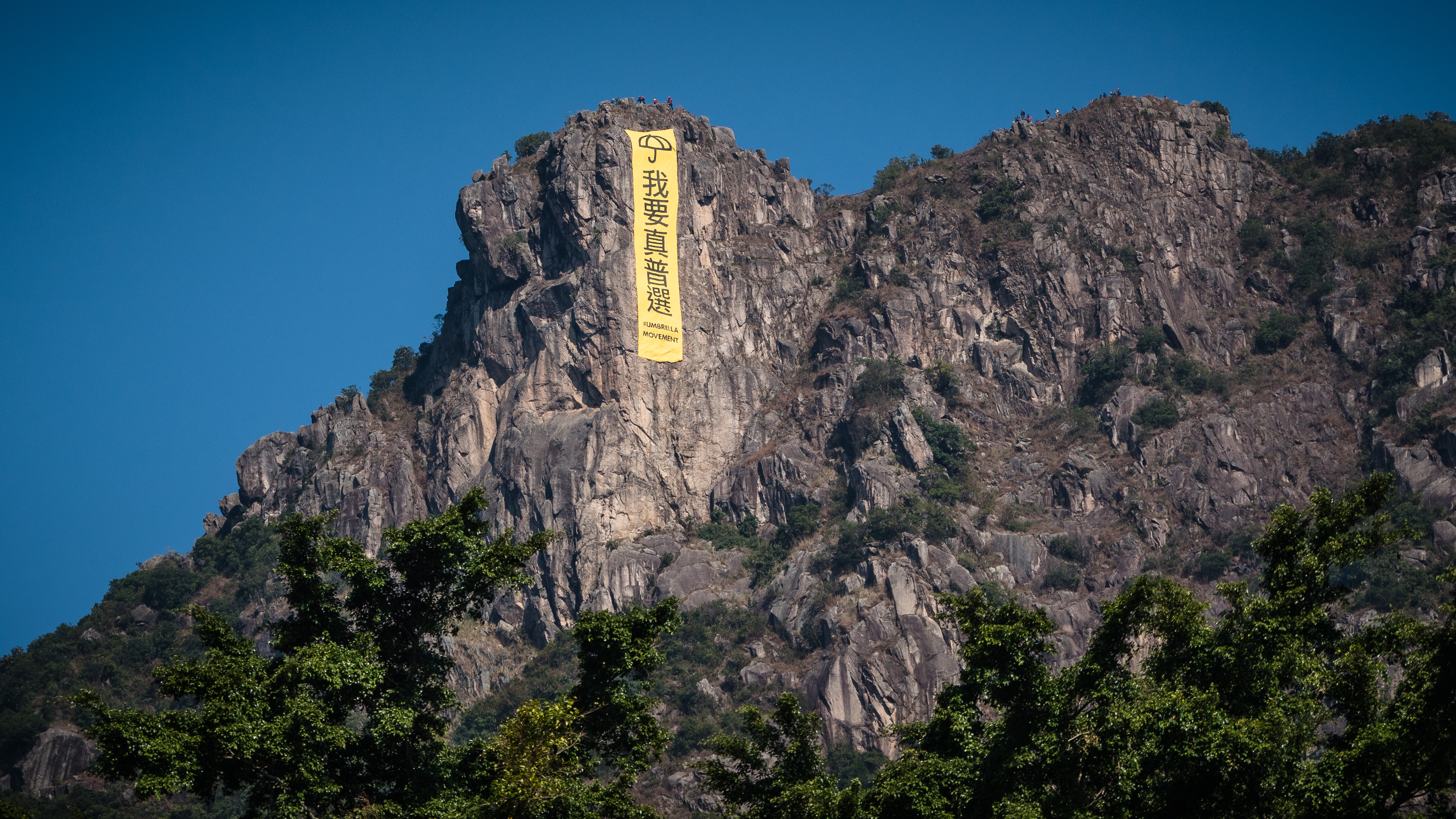
A yellow vertical protest banner which read "We demand real universal suffrage" was hung on Lion Rock during the 2014 Hong Kong protests.

Hong Kong is governed by a hybrid regime that is not fully representative of the population. Legislative Council members elected by functional constituencies composed of professional and special-interest groups are accountable to narrow corporate electorates rather than the general public. This electoral arrangement has ensured a pro-Beijing majority in the legislature since the handover. Similarly, the chief executive is selected by establishment politicians and corporate members of the Election Committee rather than directly elected. Despite universal suffrage being established as ultimate goals for the election of the chief executive and all members of the Legislative Council in Articles 45 and 68 of the basic law, the legislature is only partially directly elected, and the executive continues to be nominated by an unrepresentative body. The government has been repeatedly petitioned to introduce direct elections for these positions, but has not introduced these direct elections as of 2026.

Ethnic minorities (except those of European ancestry) have marginal representation in government and often experience discrimination in housing, education, and employment. Employment vacancies and public service appointments frequently have language requirements that minority job seekers do not meet, and language education resources remain inadequate for Chinese learners. Foreign domestic helpers, mostly women from the Philippines and Indonesia, have little protection under regional law. Although they live and work in Hong Kong, these workers are not treated as ordinary residents and do not have the right of abode in the territory.

The Joint Declaration guarantees the Basic Law of Hong Kong for 50 years after the handover. According to legal scholar Albert Chen, the Basic Law does not have an expiry date and is, unless amended, of continuing validity. In response to large-scale protests in 2019 and 2020, the Standing Committee of the National People's Congress passed the controversial Hong Kong national security law. The law criminalises secession, subversion, terrorism and collusion with foreign elements and establishes the Office for Safeguarding National Security of the CPG in the HKSAR, an investigative office under Central People's Government authority immune from HKSAR jurisdiction. Some of the aforementioned acts were previously considered protected speech under Hong Kong law. The United Kingdom considers the law to be a serious violation of the Joint Declaration. In October 2020, the Hong Kong Police arrested seven pro-democracy politicians over tussles with pro-Beijing politicians in the Legislative Council in May. They were charged with contempt and with interfering with council members, while none of the pro-Beijing lawmakers were detained. Annual commemorations of the 1989 Tiananmen Square protests and massacre were also cancelled amidst fears of violating the national security law. In March 2021, the Chinese central government changed Hong Kong's electoral system and established the Candidate Eligibility Review Committee, which would be tasked with screening and evaluating political candidates for their "patriotism", effectively crushing the remainder of the pro-democracy camp.

In February 2024, Xia Baolong, the head of the Hong Kong and Macau Affairs Office, said that the "one country, two systems" principle would be kept permanently.

== Geography ==
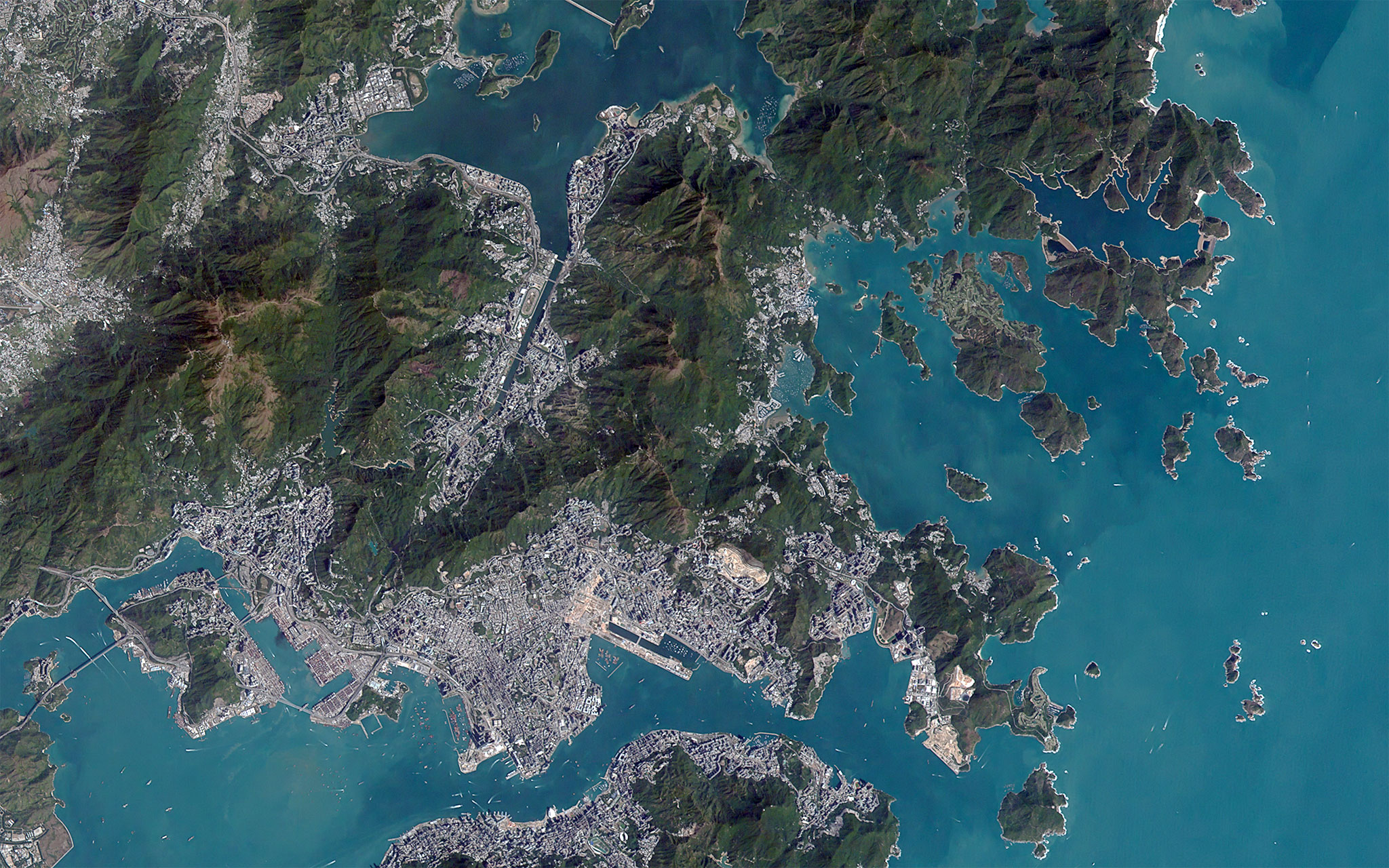
Areas of urban development and vegetation are visible in this satellite image.

Hong Kong is situated on China's southern coast, 60 km (37 mi) east of Macau and on the eastern side of the Pearl River estuary. The territory is surrounded by the South China Sea on all sides except the north, where it neighbors the Guangdong city of Shenzhen along the Sham Chun River. Its standard area is approximately 1,110 km^{2} (430 sq mi), though this figure reaches approximately 2,750 km^{2} (1,060 sq mi)^{2} when the open maritime area under its jurisdiction (rather than of mainland China) is included. The territory consists of Hong Kong Island, the Kowloon Peninsula, the New Territories, Lantau Island, and over 200 other islands.

Of the standard area, 1,073 km^{2} (414 sq mi) is land and 35 km^{2} (14 sq mi) is inland water, such as reservoirs, rivers, and ponds. The territory's highest point is Tai Mo Shan, reaching 957 metres (3,140 ft) above sea level. Urban development is primarily concentrated on the Kowloon Peninsula, Hong Kong Island, and within various new towns throughout the New Territories. Much of this is built on reclaimed land; 70 km^{2} (27 sq mi) (representing 6% of the total land or about 25% of the territory's developed space) has been reclaimed from the sea.

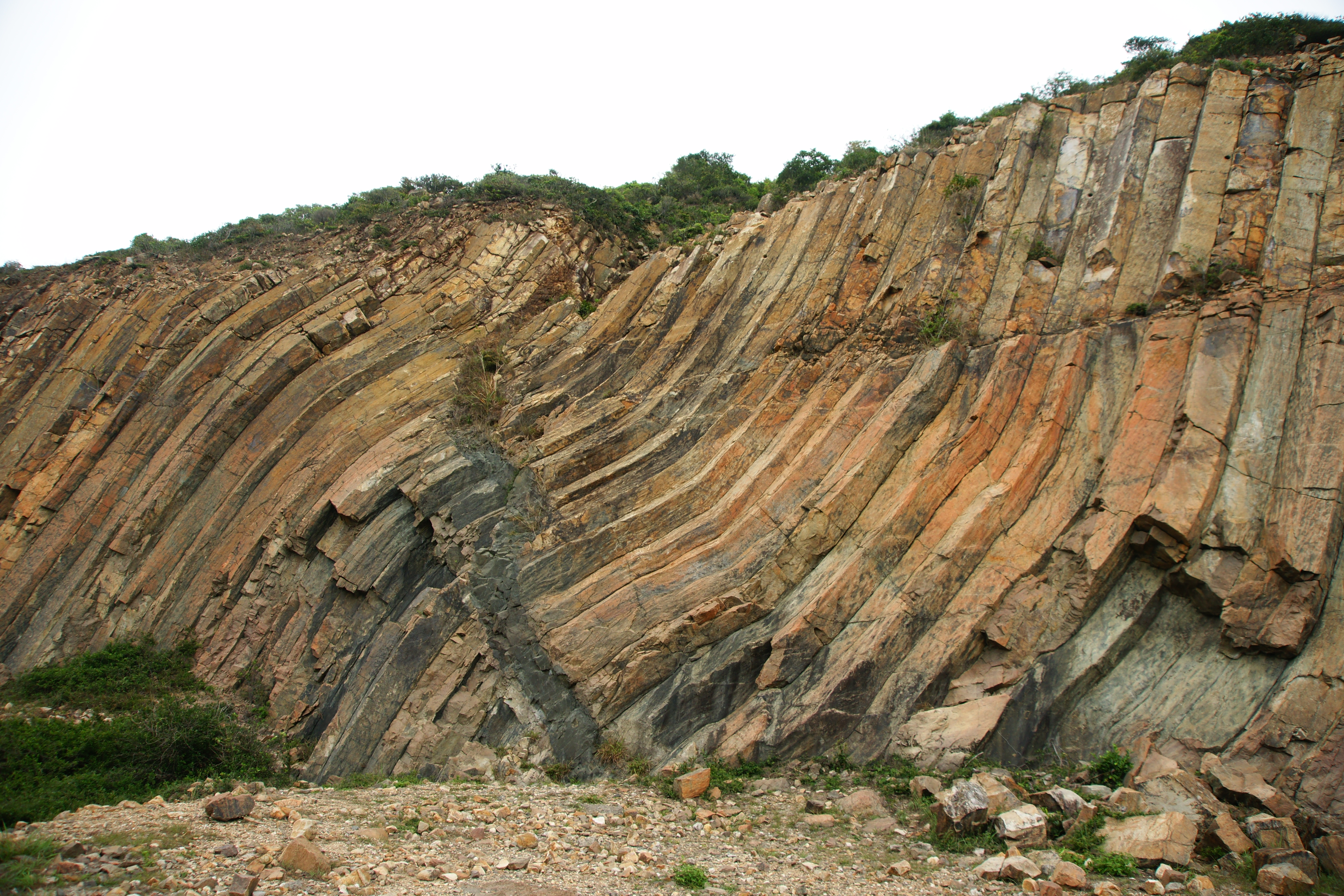
Twisted columnar jointing near the High Island Reservoir East Dam

Undeveloped terrain is hilly to mountainous, with minimal flat land, and consists mostly of grassland, woodland, shrubland, or farmland. About 40% of the remaining land area is country parks and nature reserves. The territory has a diverse ecosystem; over 3,000 species of vascular plants occur in the region (300 of which are native to Hong Kong), and thousands of insect, avian, and marine species. Hong Kong UNESCO Global Geopark was inaugurated on 3 November 2009. It is a single entity of land area over 150 km^{2} across parts of the eastern and northeastern New Territories. On 18 September 2011, UNESCO listed the geopark as part of its Global Geoparks Network.

The Hong Kong UNESCO Global Geopark consists of two geological regions:

- the Sai Kung Volcanic Rock Region, with its widely distributed tuff volcanic rocks displaying prismatic columnar jointing, which are of international geological significance
- the Northeast New Territories Sedimentary Rock Region, which comprises sedimentary rocks formed in different geologic periods, showcasing the complete geological history of Hong Kong.

=== Climate ===
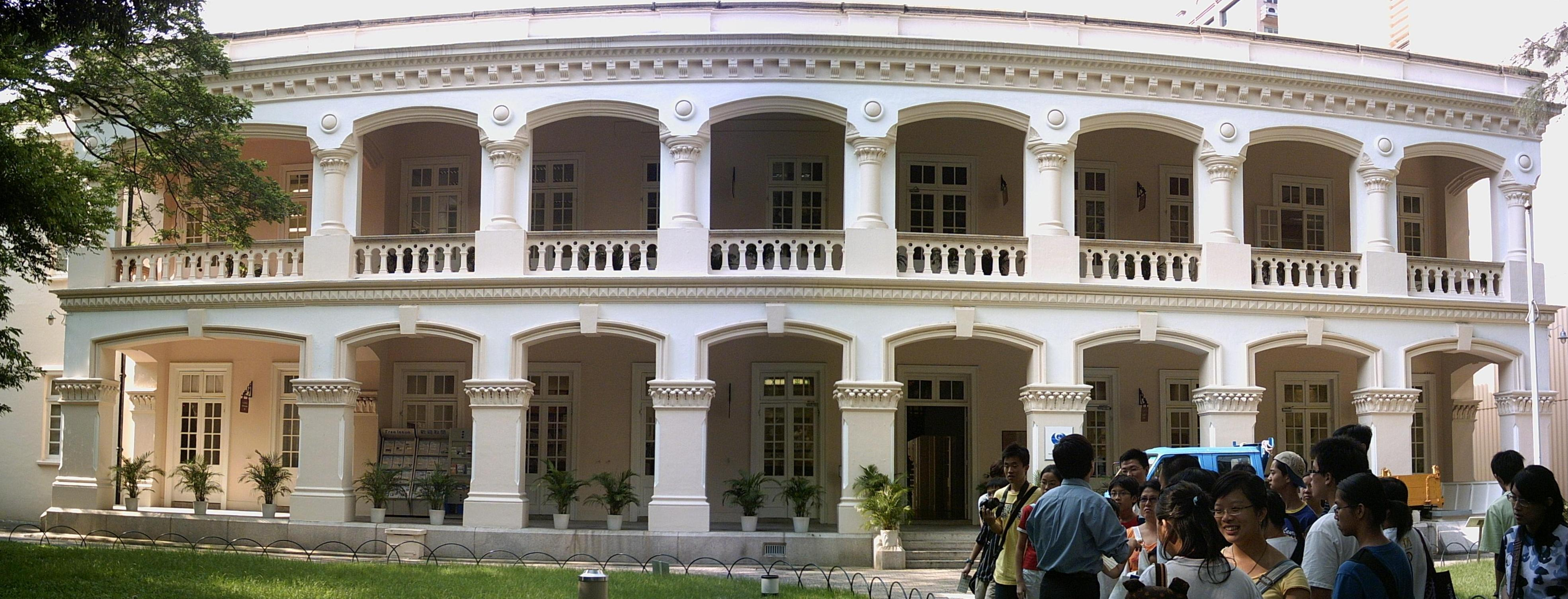
Hong Kong Observatory Headquarters

Hong Kong has a humid subtropical climate (Köppen Cwa), characteristic of southern China, closely bordering on a tropical monsoon climate. Summers are long, hot, and humid, with occasional showers and thunderstorms and warm air from the southwest. The humid climate of Hong Kong intensifies summer heat. Typhoons occur most often then, sometimes resulting in floods or landslides. Also rarely occurring are waterspouts and tornadoes, which occurred at Hong Kong International Airport on 26 September 2020 and at Victoria Harbour on 28 September 2024. Winters are short, mild and usually sunny at the beginning, becoming cloudy towards February. Frequent cold fronts bring strong, cooling winds from the north and occasionally result in chilly weather. Autumn is the sunniest season, whilst spring is generally cloudy. Snowfall has been extremely rare in Hong Kong; the last reported instance was on Tai Mo Shan in 1975. Hong Kong averages 1,709 hours of sunshine per year. Historic temperature extremes at the Hong Kong Observatory are 36.9 °C (98.4 °F) on 9 August 2026 and 0.0 °C (32.0 °F) on 18 January 1893, record highest daily minimum temperature there was 30.2 °C (86.4 °F) on 12 August 2026 and the lowest daily maximum temperature there was 3.2 °C (37.8 °F) on 16 January 1893. The highest and lowest recorded temperatures in all of Hong Kong are 39.8 °C (104 °F) at Sheung Shui on 9 August 2026, and −6.0 °C (21.2 °F) at Tai Mo Shan on 24 January 2016.

Climate data for Hong Kong (Hong Kong Observatory), normals 1991–2020, (Note: Mean monthly maxima and minima (i.e., the expected highest and lowest temperature readings at any point during the year or given month) calculated based on data in Hong Kong from 1991 to 2020.) extremes 1884–1939 and 1947–present
| Month | Jan | Feb | Mar | Apr | May | Jun | Jul | Aug | Sep | Oct | Nov | Dec | Year |
|---|---|---|---|---|---|---|---|---|---|---|---|---|---|
| Record high °C (°F) | 26.9 (80.4) | 28.3 (82.9) | 31.5 (88.7) | 33.4 (92.1) | 36.1 (97.0) | 35.6 (96.1) | 36.1 (97.0) | 36.9 (98.4) | 35.9 (96.6) | 34.6 (94.3) | 31.8 (89.2) | 28.7 (83.7) | 36.9 (98.4) |
| Mean maximum °C (°F) | 24.0 (75.2) | 25.1 (77.2) | 27.5 (81.5) | 30.2 (86.4) | 32.3 (90.1) | 33.6 (92.5) | 34.1 (93.4) | 34.2 (93.6) | 33.4 (92.1) | 31.3 (88.3) | 28.4 (83.1) | 25.1 (77.2) | 34.7 (94.5) |
| Mean daily maximum °C (°F) | 18.7 (65.7) | 19.4 (66.9) | 21.9 (71.4) | 25.6 (78.1) | 28.8 (83.8) | 30.7 (87.3) | 31.6 (88.9) | 31.3 (88.3) | 30.5 (86.9) | 28.1 (82.6) | 24.5 (76.1) | 20.4 (68.7) | 26.0 (78.8) |
| Daily mean °C (°F) | 16.5 (61.7) | 17.1 (62.8) | 19.5 (67.1) | 23.0 (73.4) | 26.3 (79.3) | 28.3 (82.9) | 28.9 (84.0) | 28.7 (83.7) | 27.9 (82.2) | 25.7 (78.3) | 22.2 (72.0) | 18.2 (64.8) | 23.5 (74.3) |
| Mean daily minimum °C (°F) | 14.6 (58.3) | 15.3 (59.5) | 17.6 (63.7) | 21.1 (70.0) | 24.5 (76.1) | 26.5 (79.7) | 26.9 (80.4) | 26.7 (80.1) | 26.1 (79.0) | 23.9 (75.0) | 20.3 (68.5) | 16.2 (61.2) | 21.6 (70.9) |
| Mean minimum °C (°F) | 9.1 (48.4) | 10.2 (50.4) | 12.2 (54.0) | 16.3 (61.3) | 20.7 (69.3) | 23.6 (74.5) | 24.2 (75.6) | 24.3 (75.7) | 23.5 (74.3) | 20.1 (68.2) | 15.3 (59.5) | 10.1 (50.2) | 7.8 (46.0) |
| Record low °C (°F) | 0.0 (32.0) | 2.4 (36.3) | 4.8 (40.6) | 9.9 (49.8) | 15.4 (59.7) | 19.2 (66.6) | 21.7 (71.1) | 21.6 (70.9) | 18.4 (65.1) | 13.5 (56.3) | 6.5 (43.7) | 4.3 (39.7) | 0.0 (32.0) |
| Average rainfall mm (inches) | 33.2 (1.31) | 38.9 (1.53) | 75.3 (2.96) | 153.0 (6.02) | 290.6 (11.44) | 491.5 (19.35) | 385.8 (15.19) | 453.2 (17.84) | 321.4 (12.65) | 120.3 (4.74) | 39.3 (1.55) | 28.8 (1.13) | 2,431.2 (95.72) |
| Average rainy days (≥ 0.1 mm) | 5.70 | 7.97 | 10.50 | 11.37 | 15.37 | 19.33 | 18.43 | 17.50 | 14.90 | 7.83 | 5.70 | 5.30 | 139.90 |
| Average relative humidity (%) | 74 | 79 | 82 | 83 | 83 | 82 | 81 | 81 | 78 | 73 | 72 | 70 | 78 |
| Average dew point °C (°F) | 11.7 (53.1) | 13.2 (55.8) | 16.1 (61.0) | 19.7 (67.5) | 23.0 (73.4) | 24.9 (76.8) | 25.2 (77.4) | 25.1 (77.2) | 23.6 (74.5) | 20.2 (68.4) | 16.7 (62.1) | 12.4 (54.3) | 19.3 (66.7) |
| Mean monthly sunshine hours | 145.8 | 101.7 | 100.0 | 113.2 | 138.8 | 144.3 | 197.3 | 182.1 | 174.4 | 197.8 | 172.3 | 161.6 | 1,829.3 |
| Percentage possible sunshine | 43 | 32 | 27 | 30 | 34 | 36 | 48 | 46 | 47 | 55 | 52 | 48 | 41 |
Source: Hong Kong Observatory

=== Environment ===
Air pollution in Hong Kong is considered a major problem. It became a concern soon after the start of the 2000s. According to the Environmental Protection Department (EPD), the major air pollutants in Hong Kong include nitrogen oxides (NO_{x}), sulphur dioxide (SO_{2}), respirable suspended particulates (RSP or PM_{10}), fine suspended particulates (FSP or PM_{2.5}), volatile organic compounds (VOC), carbon monoxide (CO), ozone and lead.

=== Architecture ===
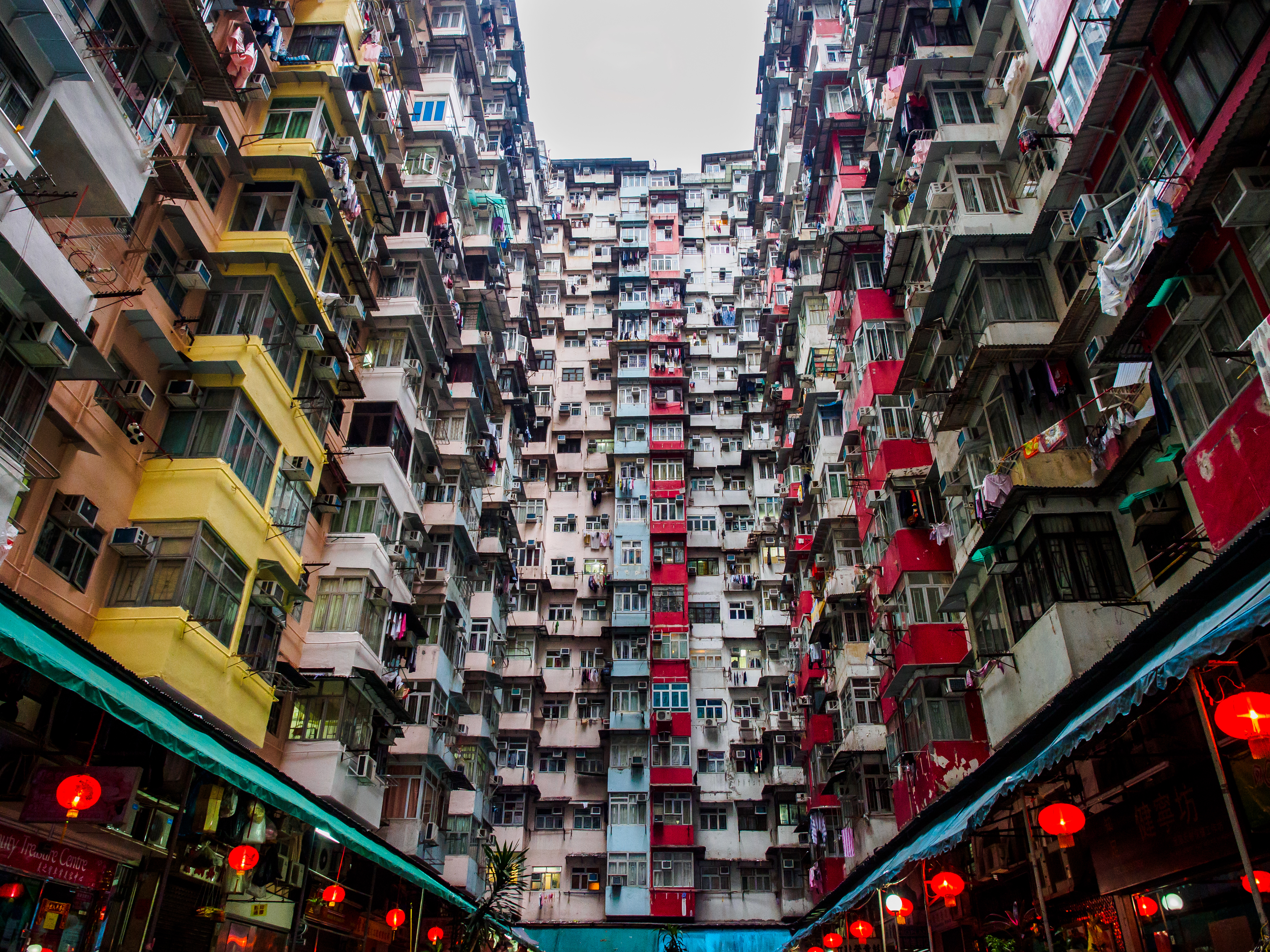
Monster Building, a famous group of residential buildings in Quarry Bay

Hong Kong has the world's largest number of skyscrapers, with 554 towers taller than 150 metres (490 ft), and the third-largest number of high-rise buildings in the world. The lack of available space restricted development to high-density residential tenements and commercial complexes packed closely together on buildable land. Single-family detached homes are uncommon and generally only found in outlying areas. The International Commerce Centre and Two International Finance Centre are the tallest buildings in Hong Kong and are among the tallest in the Asia-Pacific region. Other distinctive buildings lining the Hong Kong Island skyline include the HSBC Main Building, the anemometer-topped triangular Central Plaza, the circular Hopewell Centre, and the sharp-edged Bank of China Tower.

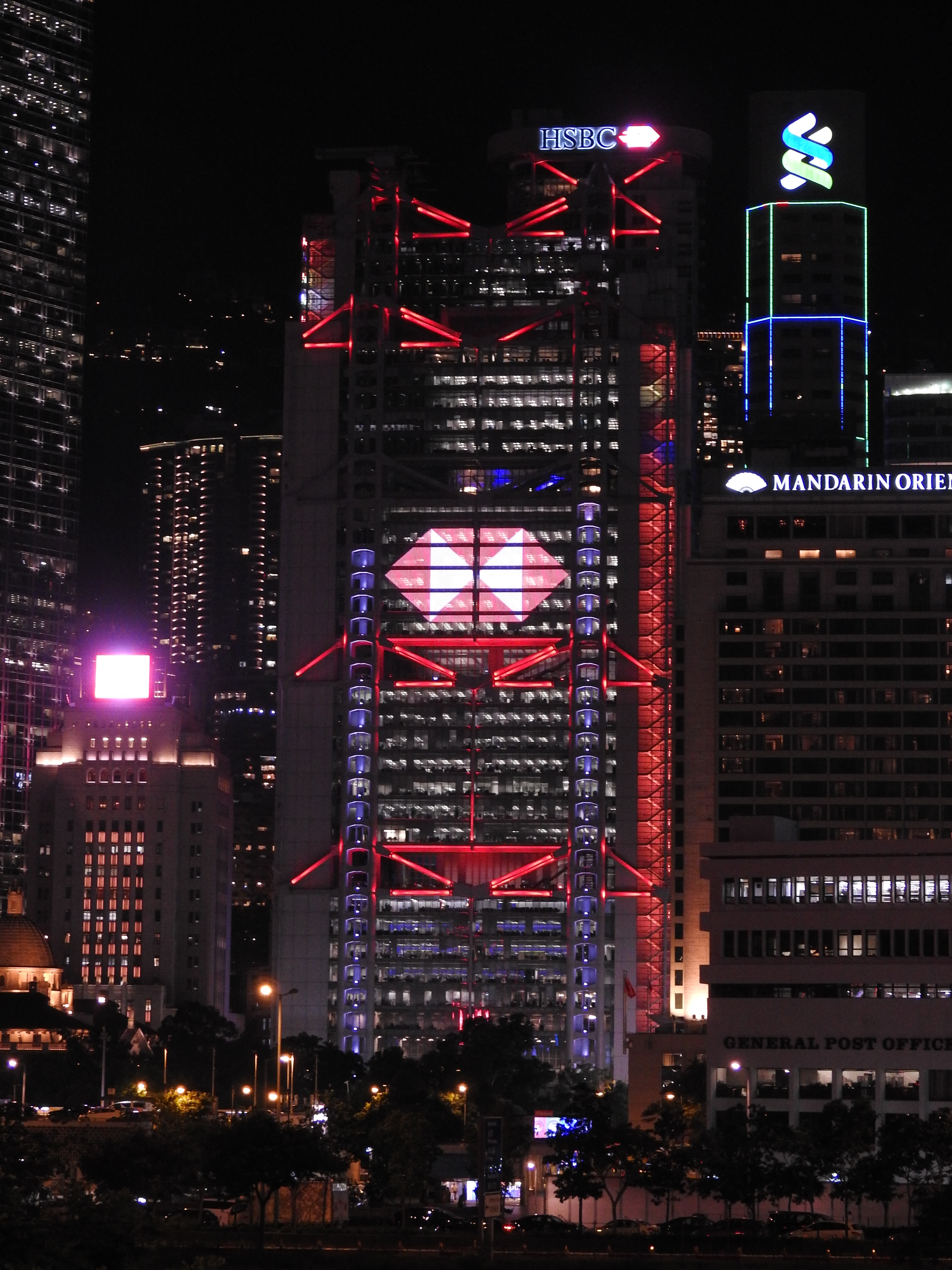
HSBC Building

Demand for new construction has contributed to the frequent demolition of older buildings, freeing space for modern high-rises. However, many examples of European and Lingnan architecture are still found throughout the territory. Older government buildings are examples of colonial architecture. The 1846 Flagstaff House, the former residence of the Commander of the British forces in Hong Kong, is the oldest Western-style building in Hong Kong. Some buildings, such as the Court of Final Appeal Building and the Hong Kong Observatory retain their original functions, and others have been adapted and reused; the Former Marine Police Headquarters was redeveloped into a commercial and retail complex, and Béthanie (built in 1875 as a sanatorium) houses the Hong Kong Academy for Performing Arts. The Tin Hau Temple, dedicated to the sea goddess Mazu (originally built in 1012 and rebuilt in 1266), is the territory's oldest existing structure. The Ping Shan Heritage Trail has architectural examples from several imperial Chinese dynasties, including the Tsui Sing Lau Pagoda (Hong Kong's only remaining pagoda).

Tong lau, mixed-use tenement buildings constructed during the colonial era, blended southern Chinese architectural styles with European influences. These were especially prolific during the immediate post-war period, when many were rapidly built to house large numbers of Chinese migrants. Examples include Lui Seng Chun, the Blue House in Wan Chai, and the Shanghai Street shophouses in Mong Kok. Mass-produced public-housing estates, built since the 1960s, are mainly constructed in modernist style.

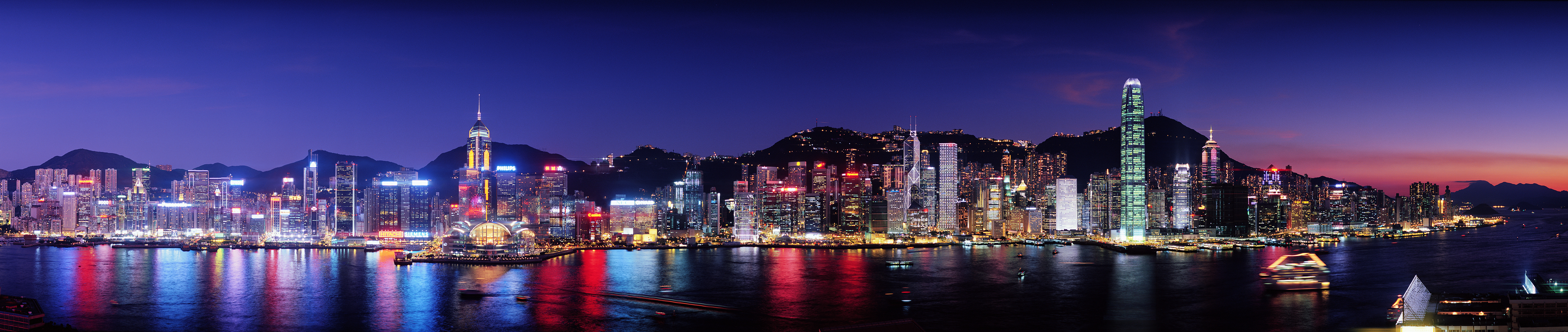
The Hong Kong Island skyline, viewed from the Victoria Harbour waterfront
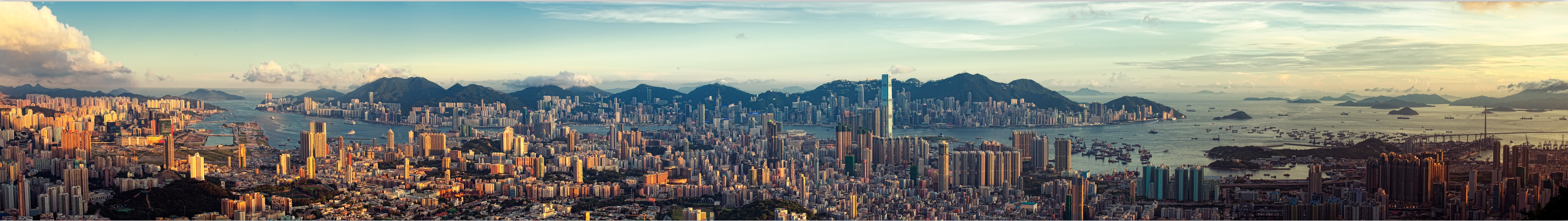
City view of Kowloon, Hong Kong Island, and the Hong Kong skyline

== Demographics ==
Death rates (No. of Deaths per 100,000 Population) by leading causes of death, based on ICD 10th Revision. Red: increased compared with 2001. Deaths from dementia increased more than 5 times from 2001 to 2021.
| Cause of Death | 2001 | 2011 | 2021 |
|---|---|---|---|
| 1. Malignant neoplasms | 169.9 | 187.2 | 203.8 |
| 2. Pneumonia | 45.1 | 87.8 | 132.6 |
| 3. Diseases of heart | 70 | 89.6 | 89 |
| 4. Cerebrovascular | 46.6 | 47.2 | 42.2 |
| 5. External causes of; morbidity and mortality | 27.5 | 22.2 | 26.7 |
| 6. Nephritis, nephrotic; syndrome and nephrosis | 15.7 | 21.8 | 24 |
| 7. Dementia | 3.8 | 10.6 | 20.2 |
| 8. Septicaemia | 6.3 | 10.8 | 16.8 |
| 9. Chronic lower; respiratory diseases | 31.5 | 27.8 | 14.3 |
| 10. Diabetes mellitus | 10.1 | 6.5 | 7.4 |
| All other causes | 69.7 | 85 | 118.1 |
| All causes | 496 | 596.6 | 695.2 |

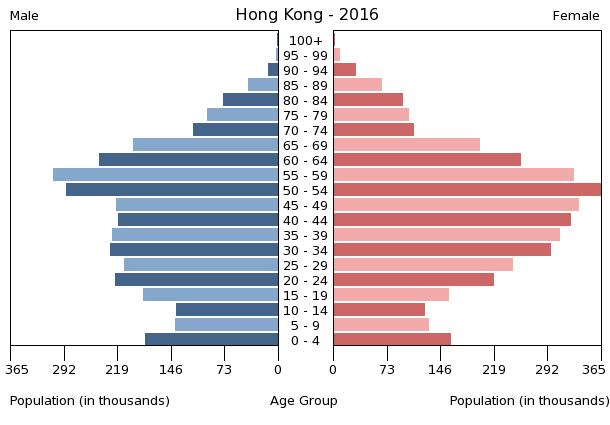
2016 population pyramid

The Census and Statistics Department estimated Hong Kong's population at 7,413,070 in 2021. The overwhelming majority (91.6%) is Chinese, most of whom are Taishanese, Teochew, Hakka, and other Cantonese peoples. The remaining 8.4% are non-ethnic Chinese minorities, primarily Filipinos, Indonesians, and South Asians. However, most Filipinos and Indonesians in Hong Kong are short-term workers. According to a 2021 thematic report by the Hong Kong government, after excluding foreign domestic helpers, the real number of non-Chinese ethnic minorities in the city was 301,344, or 4% of Hong Kong's population. About half the population have some form of British nationality, a legacy of colonial rule; 3.4 million residents have British National (Overseas) status, and 260,000 British citizens live in the territory. The vast majority also hold Chinese nationality, automatically granted to all ethnic Chinese residents at the handover. Headline population density exceeds 7,060 people/km^{2} It is the fourth-highest in the world.

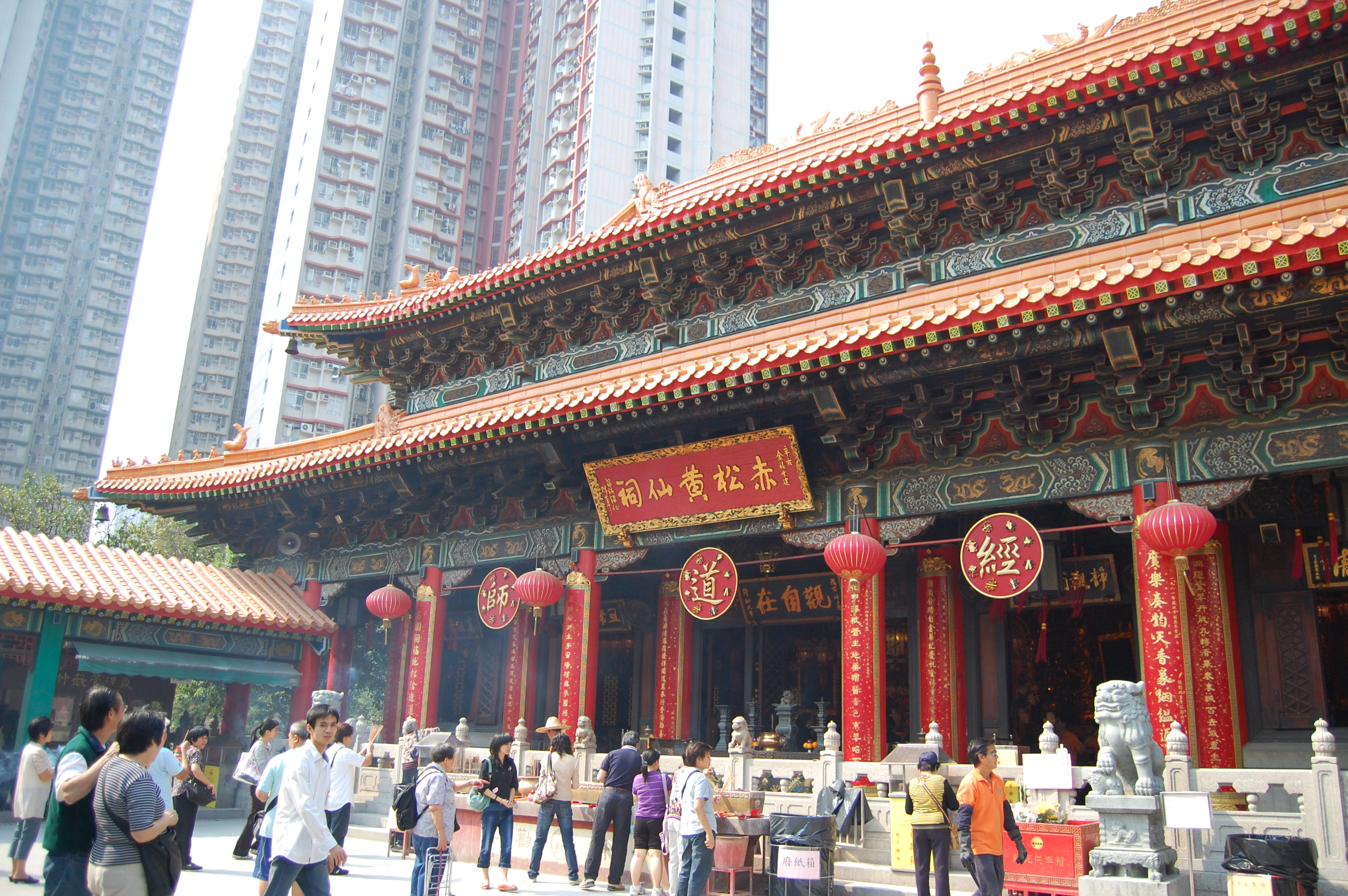
Wong Tai Sin Temple is dedicated to the Taoist deity Wong Tai Sin.

Among the religious population, the traditional "three teachings" of China, Buddhism, Confucianism, and Taoism, have the most adherents (20%), followed by Christianity (12%) and Islam (4%). Followers of other religions, including Sikhism, Hinduism, and Judaism, generally originate from regions where their religion predominates.

Life expectancy in Hong Kong was 82.8 years for males and 88.4 years for females at birth in 2024. The birth rate in 2023 was 0.751 per woman of child-bearing age. Cancer, pneumonia, heart disease, cerebrovascular disease, and accidents are the territory's five leading causes of death. The universal public healthcare system is funded by general-tax revenue, and treatment is highly subsidised; on average, 95% of healthcare costs are covered by the government.

The city has a severe amount of income inequality, which has risen since the handover, as the region's ageing population has gradually added to the number of nonworking people. Although median household income steadily increased during the decade to 2021, the wage gap remained high; the 90th percentile of earners receive 41% of all income. The city has the most billionaires per capita, with one billionaire per 109,657 people, as well as the second-highest number of billionaires of any city in the world, the highest number of billionaires of any city in Asia, and the second largest concentration of ultra high-net-worth individuals of any city in the world. Despite government efforts to reduce the growing disparity, median income for the top 10% of earners is 57 times that of the bottom 10%.

== Economy ==
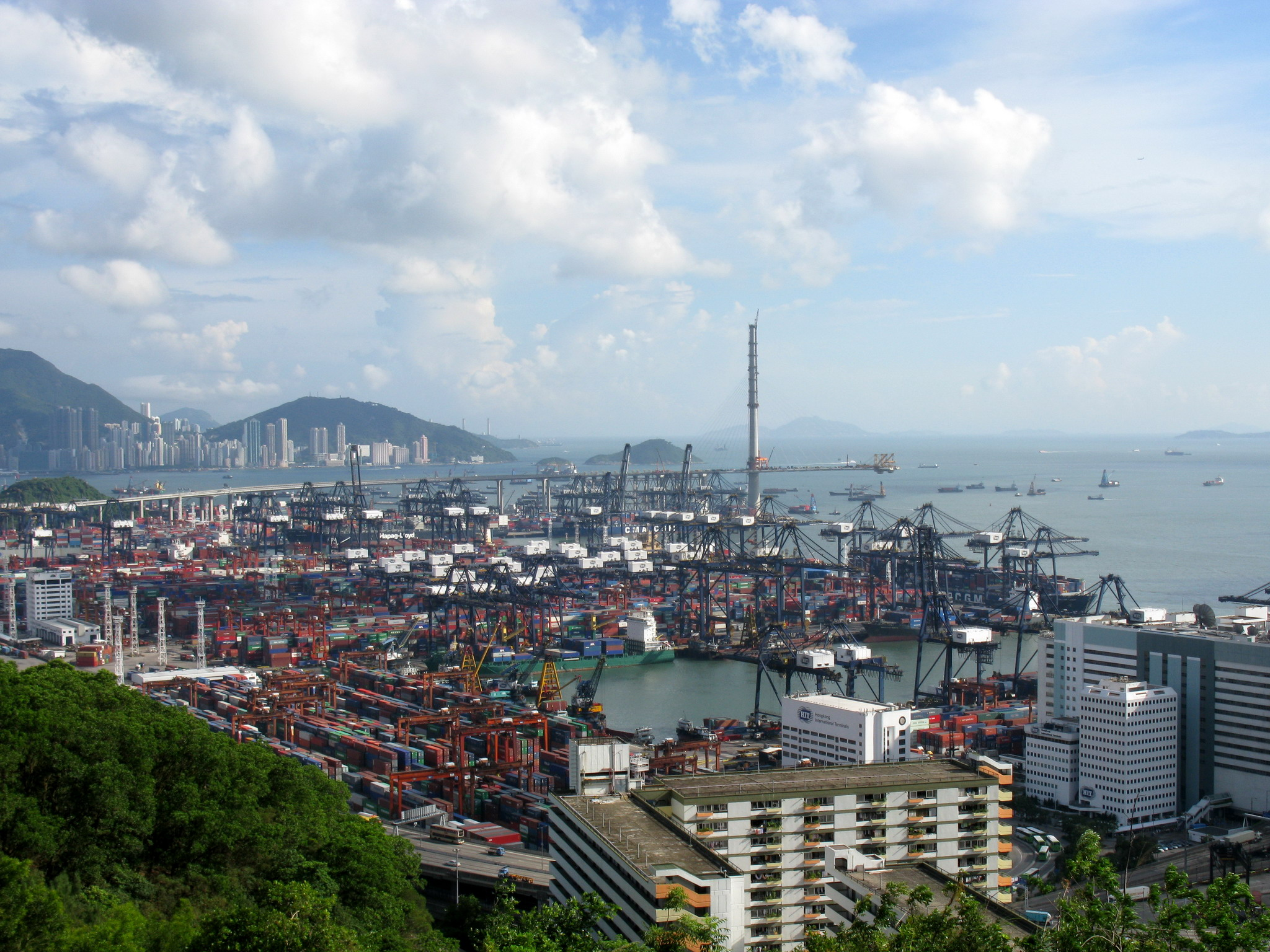
Hong Kong is one of the world's busiest container ports.

Along with Singapore, South Korea, and Taiwan, Hong Kong is one of the Four Asian Tigers.

One of the world's most significant financial centres and commercial ports, Hong Kong has a market economy focused on services, characterised by low taxation, minimal government market intervention, and an established international financial market. It is the world's 39th-largest economy, with a nominal GDP of approximately $446 billion USD. Hong Kong is highly developed, and ranks fourth on the UN Human Development Index. The Hong Kong Stock Exchange is the fifth-largest in the world, with a market capitalisation of HK$48.2 trillion (US$6.17 trillion) as of December 2025. Hong Kong was ranked as the 15th most innovative territory in the 2025 Global Innovation Index, and stepped ahead to the 14th position in 2026. Hong Kong was ranked 3rd in the Global Financial Centres Index. The city is sometimes referred to as "Silicon Harbour" in the 1990s, a nickname derived from Silicon Valley in California.

Hong Kong is the ninth largest trading entity in exports and eighth largest in imports (2021), trading more goods in value than its gross domestic product. Over half of its cargo throughput consists of transshipments (goods travelling through Hong Kong). Products from mainland China account for about 40% of that traffic. The city's location allowed it to establish a transportation and logistics infrastructure, which includes the world's seventh-busiest container port and the busiest airport for international cargo. The territory's largest export markets are mainland China and the United States. Hong Kong is a key part of the 21st Century Maritime Silk Road. It has little arable land and few natural resources, importing most of its food and raw materials. More than 90% of Hong Kong's food is imported, including nearly all of its meat and rice. Agricultural activity is 0.1% of GDP and consists of growing premium food and flower varieties.

Although the territory had one of Asia's largest manufacturing economies during the latter half of the colonial era, Hong Kong's economy is now dominated by the service sector. The sector generates 92.7% of economic output, with the public sector accounting for about 10%. Between 1961 and 1997, Hong Kong's gross domestic product increased by a factor of 180, and per capita GDP increased by a factor of 87. The territory's GDP relative to mainland China's peaked at 27% in 1993; it fell to less than 3% in 2017, as the mainland developed and liberalised its economy. Economic and infrastructure integration with China has increased significantly since the 1978 start of the reform and opening up on the mainland. Since the resumption of cross-boundary train service in 1979, many rail and road links have been improved and constructed, facilitating trade between regions. The Closer Economic Partnership Arrangement formalised a policy of free trade between the two areas, with each jurisdiction pledging to remove remaining obstacles to trade and cross-boundary investment. A similar economic partnership with Macau details the liberalisation of trade between the special administrative regions. Chinese companies have expanded their economic presence in the territory since the handover. Mainland firms represent over half of the Hang Seng Index value, up from 5% in 1997.

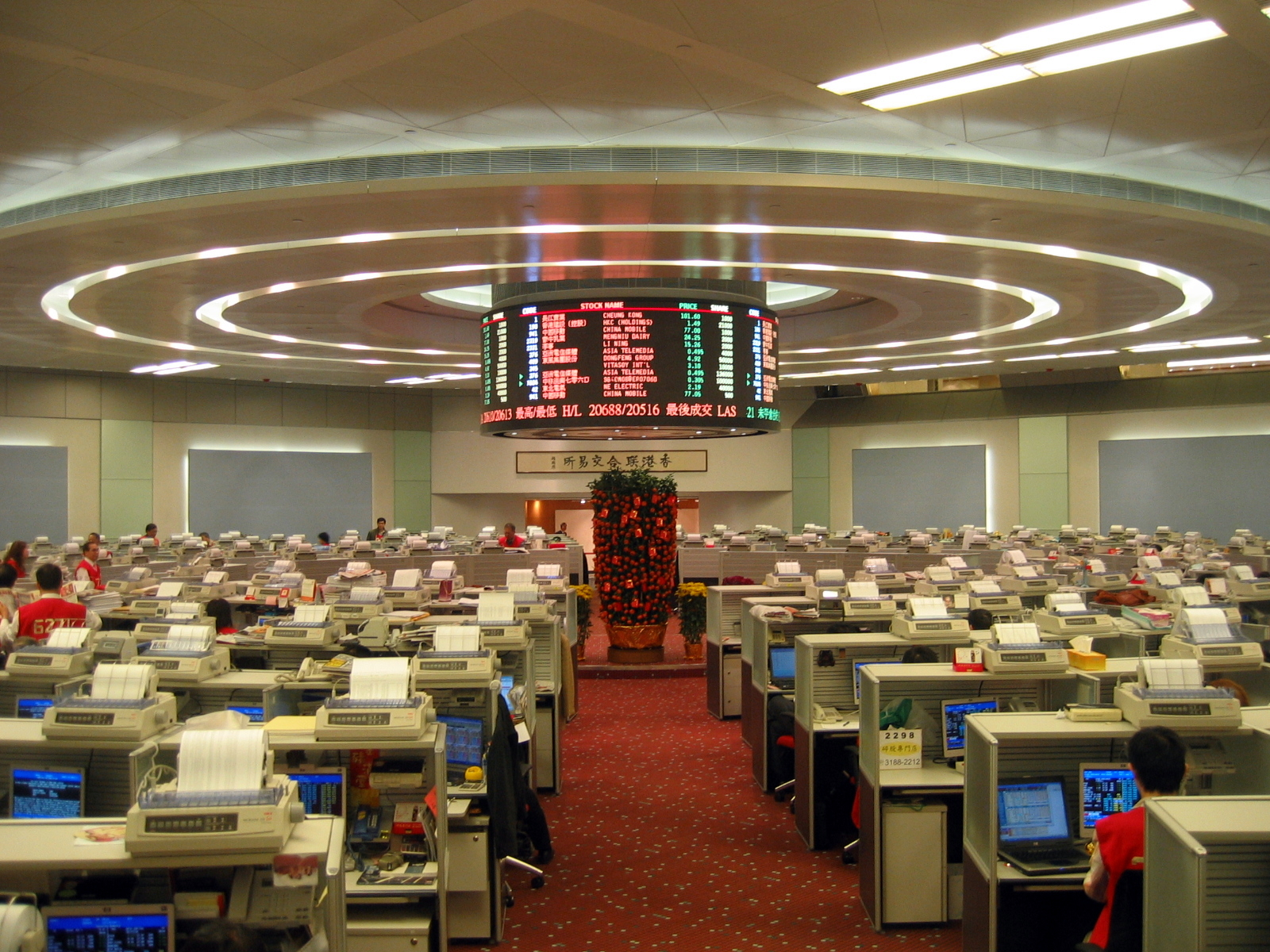
Former trading floor of the Hong Kong Stock Exchange

As the mainland economy liberalised, Hong Kong's shipping industry faced intense competition from other Chinese ports. Half of China's trade goods were routed through Hong Kong in 1997, dropping to about 13% by 2015. The territory's minimal taxation, common law system, and civil service attract overseas corporations wishing to establish a presence in Asia. The city has the second-highest number of corporate headquarters in the Asia-Pacific region. Hong Kong is a gateway for foreign direct investment in China, giving investors open access to mainland Chinese markets through direct links with the Shanghai and Shenzhen stock exchanges. The territory was the first market outside mainland China for renminbi-denominated bonds, and is one of the largest hubs for offshore renminbi trading. In November 2020, Hong Kong's Financial Services and the Treasury Bureau proposed a new law that will restrict cryptocurrency trading to professional investors only, leaving amateur traders (93% of Hong Kong's trading population) out of the market. The Hong Kong dollar, the local currency, is the eighth-most traded currency in the world. Due to extremely compact house sizes and the extremely high housing density, the city has the most expensive housing market in the world.

The government has had a passive role in the economy. Colonial governments had little industrial policy and implemented almost no trade controls. Under the doctrine of "positive non-interventionism", post-war administrations deliberately avoided direct resource allocation; active intervention was considered detrimental to economic growth. While the economy transitioned to a service basis during the 1980s, late colonial governments introduced interventionist policies. Post-handover administrations continued and expanded these programmes, including export-credit guarantees, a compulsory pension scheme, a minimum wage, anti-discrimination laws, and a state mortgage backer.

In April 2026, Hong Kong's Securities and Futures Commission launched a regulatory framework to enable secondary trading of tokenised investment products on licensed virtual asset platforms, aiming to broaden retail investors' access to regulated digital asset trading services.

=== Tourism ===
Tourism is a major part of Hong Kong's economy, accounting for 5% of its GDP. In 2016, 26.6 million visitors contributed HK$258 billion (US$32.9 billion) to the territory, making Hong Kong the 14th-most popular destination for international tourists. It is the most popular Chinese city for tourists, receiving over 70% more visitors than its closest competitor Macau. The city is ranked as one of the most expensive cities for expatriates. However, since 2020, there has been a sharp decline in incoming visitors due to tight COVID-19 travel restrictions. In an attempt to attract tourists back to Hong Kong, the Hong Kong government announced plans to give away 500,000 free airline tickets in 2023. Hong Kong was the second most visited city in the world with 23.2 million visitors in 2025.

Luxury hotels in Hong Kong include the Rosewood Hong Kong, Upper House, Mandarin Oriental Hong Kong, The Peninsula, Four Seasons Hotel Hong Kong, Island Shangri-La, Grand Hyatt Hong Kong, St. Regis Hong Kong and the Ritz-Carlton Hong Kong.

Victoria Peak is a major tourist attraction that offers views of Central and Victoria Harbour.

== Infrastructure ==
=== Transport ===
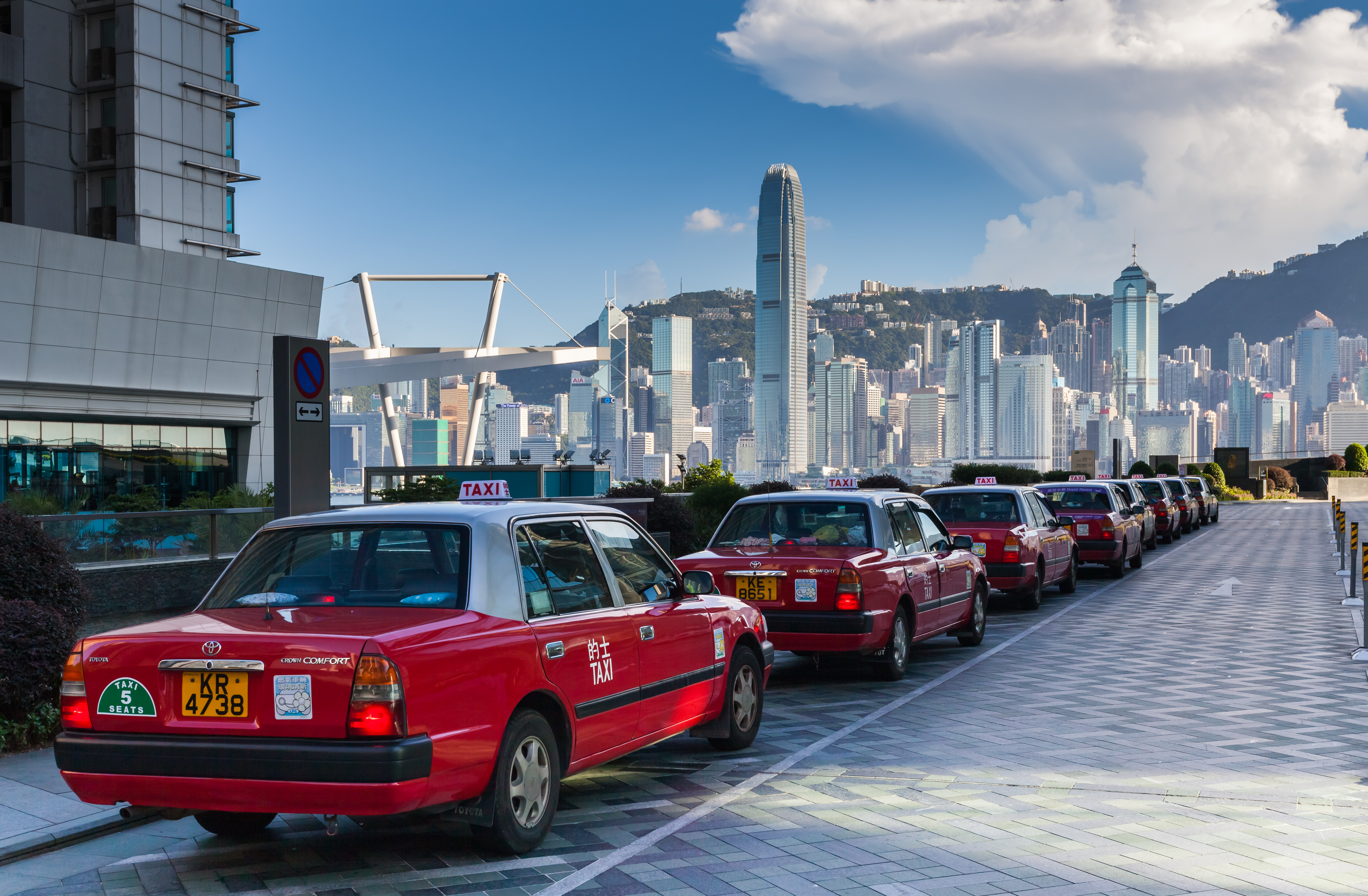
Hong Kong taxis

Hong Kong has a highly developed and sophisticated transport network. Over 90% of daily trips made by its residents are made with public transport, the highest percentage in the world. The Octopus card, a contactless smart payment card made for Hong Kong, is widely accepted on railways, trams, buses and ferries, and can also be used for payment in most retail stores. Alternative payments such as Apple Pay, AliPay, Mastercard, and Visa have also been gradually introduced as methods of payment for public transport.

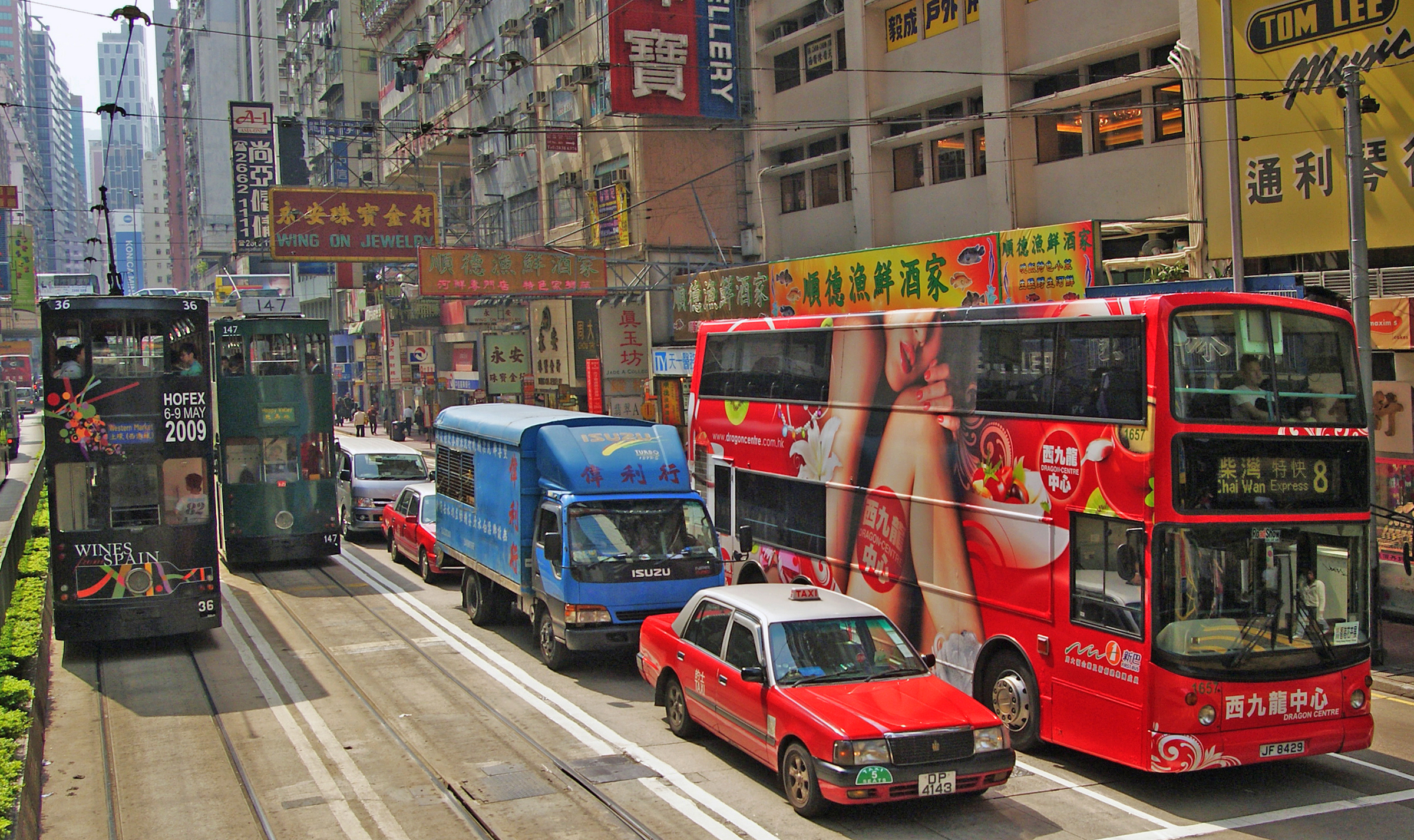
Hong Kong buses and trams

Hong Kong's EV policy, driven by the "Hong Kong Roadmap on Popularisation of Electric Vehicles," aims to achieve zero vehicular emissions before 2050. Key strategies include banning new registration of fuel-propelled private cars, including hybrids, by 2035 or earlier, expanding charging infrastructure, and offering significant, extended tax concessions such as the One-for-One Replacement Scheme (expiring 31 March 2026).

==== Land ====
The Peak Tram, Hong Kong's first public transport system, has provided funicular rail transport between Central and Victoria Peak since 1888.

The Central and Western District has an extensive system of escalators and moving pavements, which, together with the Mid-Levels escalator system, is the world's longest outdoor covered escalator system.

Hong Kong Tramways' tram network covers a portion of Hong Kong Island, covering from Kennedy Town to Shau Kei Wan, with a branch to Happy Valley. It operates 6 routes and had a ridership of 42,558 in 2022. It began servicing Hong Kong since 1904. Hong Kong Tramways currently holds the Guinness World Record as the "Largest double-decker tram fleet in service", certified on 30 July 2021, with a fleet of 165 double-decker trams. The fleet of trams was mostly built by Hong Kong Tramways.

The Mass Transit Railway (MTR) is an extensive passenger rail network, connecting 99 metro stations and 68 light-rail stops throughout the territory. With a daily ridership of almost five million, the system serves 41% of all public transit passengers in the city and has an on-time rate of 99.9%.

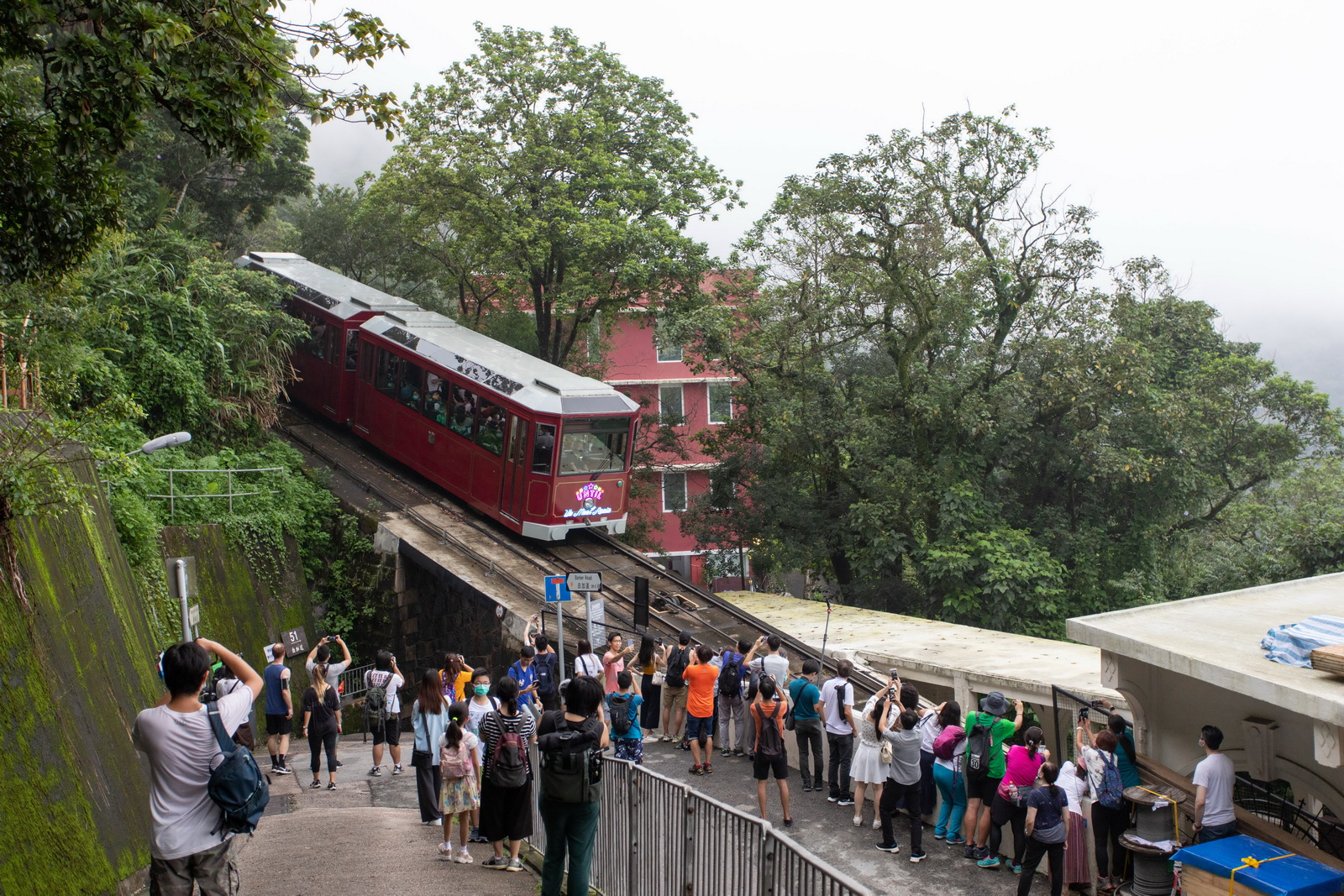
Hong Kong Peak Tram

The East Rail line offers metro services to Shenzhen. Its southern terminus is Admiralty. Connecting service to the national high-speed rail system is provided at West Kowloon railway station.

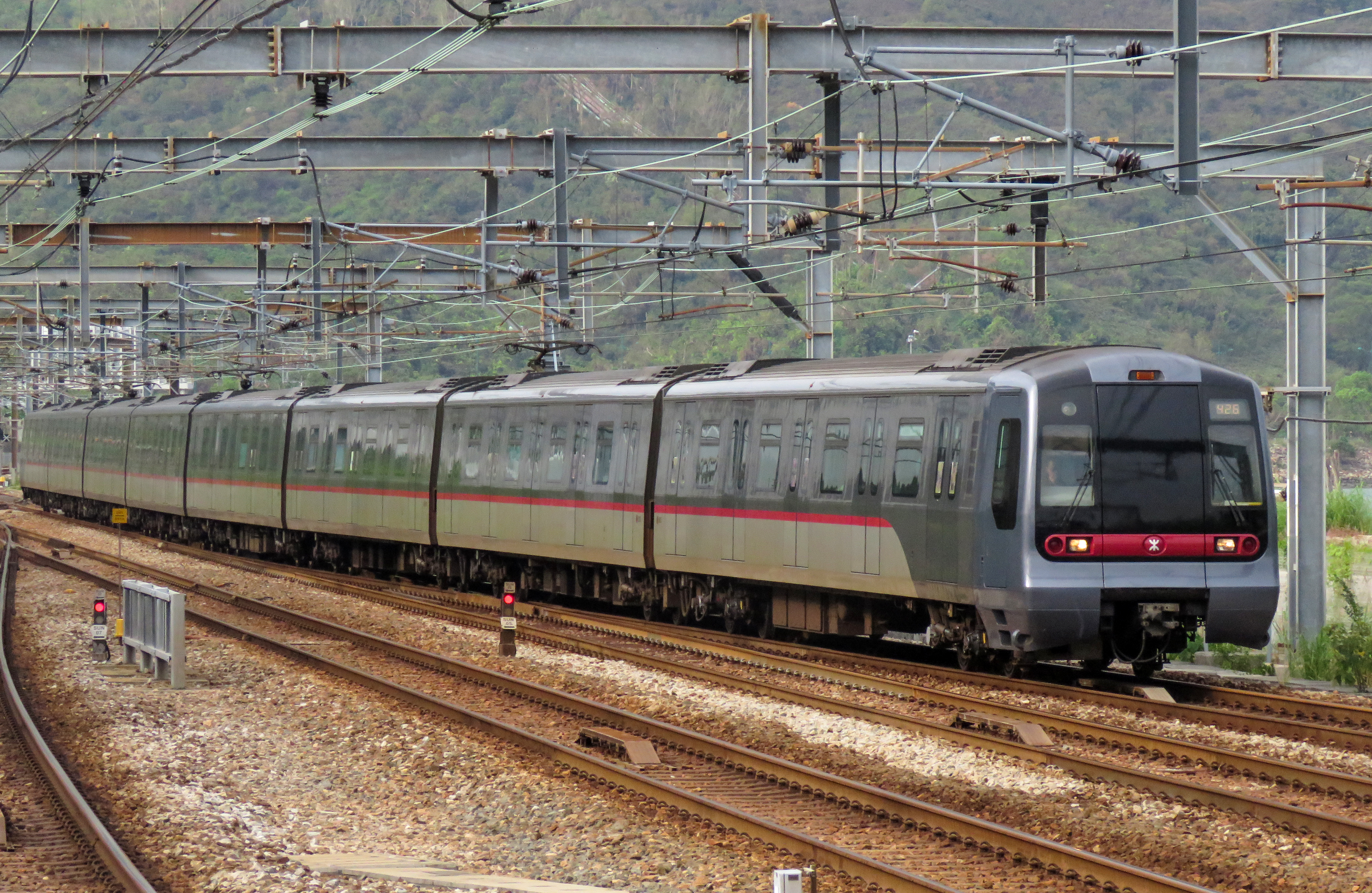
MTR train on the Tung Chung line

Although public transport systems handle most passenger traffic, over 500,000 private vehicles are registered in Hong Kong. Unlike in mainland China, automobiles in Hong Kong drive on the left due to the historical influence of the British Empire. Vehicle traffic is extremely congested in urban areas, exacerbated by limited space to expand roads and an increasing number of vehicles. More than 18,000 taxicabs, easily identifiable by their bright colours and taxi lights, are licensed to carry riders in the territory. Unlicensed ride-hailing services such as Uber exist in Hong Kong as well, with some operating with licensed taxis to legitimise their business in ride-sharing. Unlicensed drivers have been targeted by the government and taxi drivers in the past, mainly due to the lack of third-party insurance for passengers, and because taxi drivers feared competition from drivers of these ride-hailing services. In 2024, the government looked into legalising these services.Bus services operate more than 700 routes across the territory, with smaller public light buses (also known as minibuses) serving areas standard buses do not reach as frequently or directly. Expressways and truck roads, organised with the Hong Kong Strategic Route and Exit Number System, connect all major areas of the territory. The Hong Kong–Zhuhai–Macau Bridge provides a direct route to the western side of the Pearl River estuary.

==== Air ====
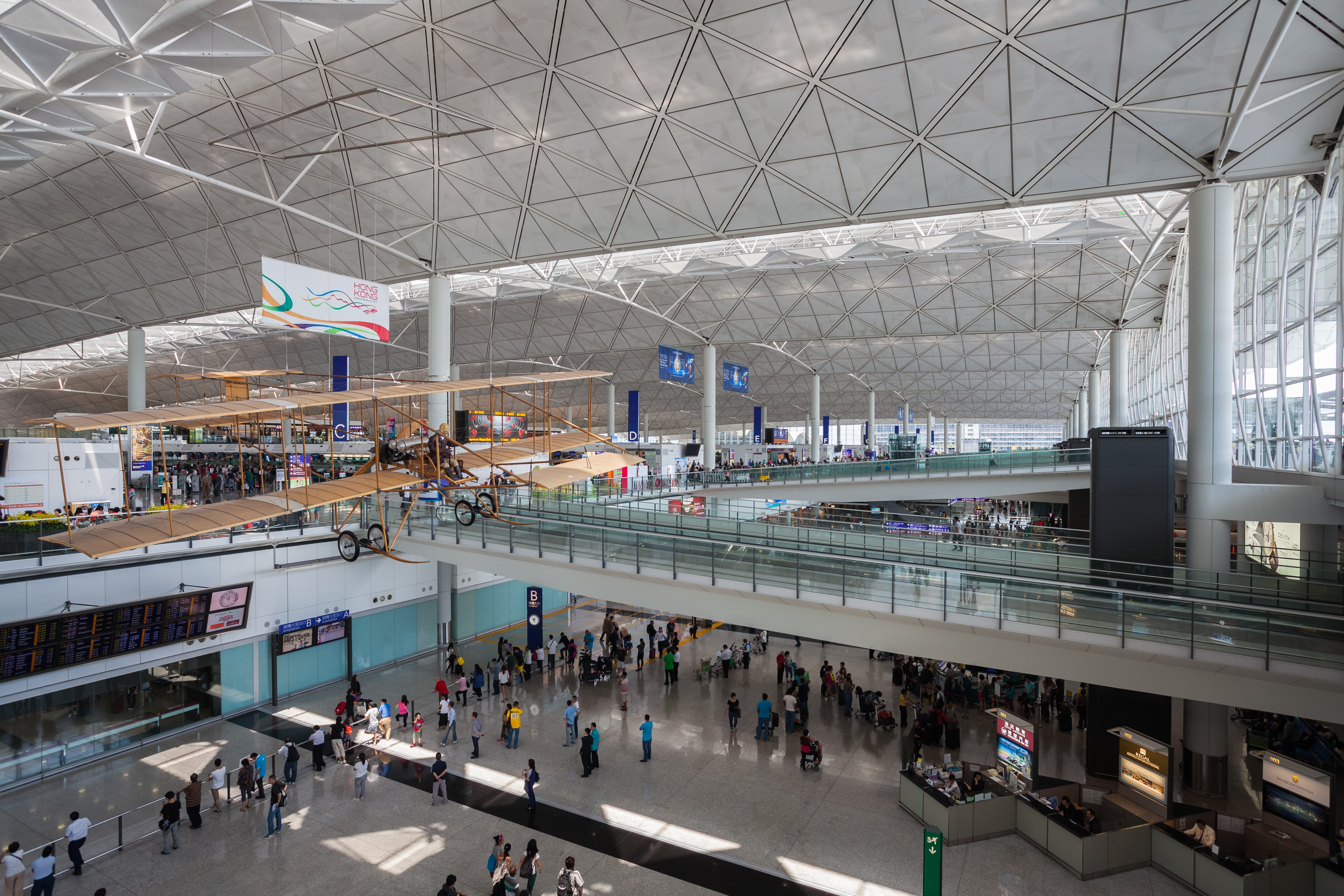
Hong Kong International Airport

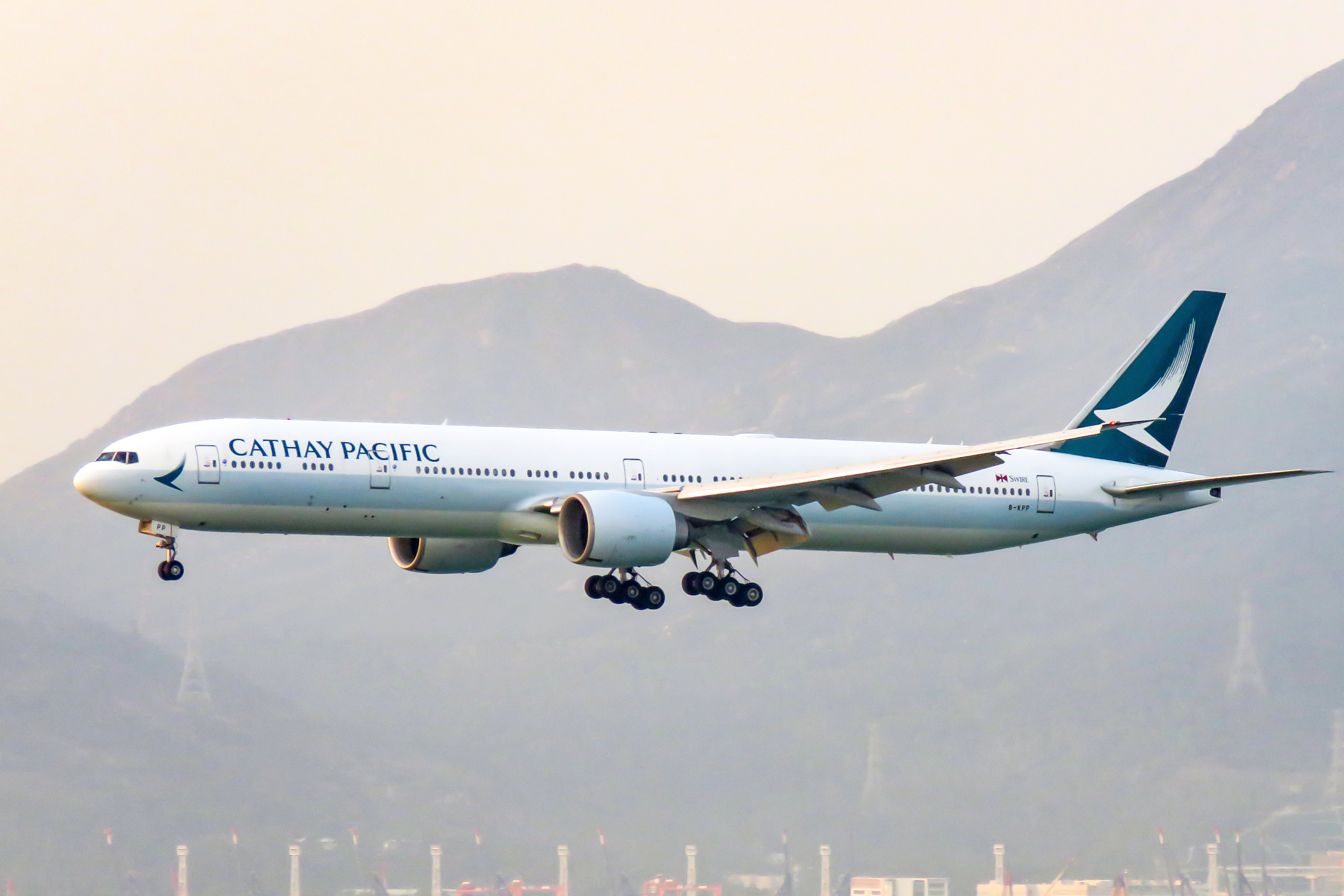
Cathay Pacific, Hong Kong's Flagcarrier

Hong Kong International Airport is the territory's primary airport, replacing Kai Tak International Airport which ended operations in 1998.

Over 100 airlines operate flights from the airport, including Cathay Pacific, the flag carrier of Hong Kong. It has been regarded as a 5-star airline by Skytrax and has been in the world's top 10 list of airlines for multiple consecutive years. Hong Kong Airlines, low-cost airline HK Express, low-cost airline Greater Bay Airlines, and cargo airline Air Hong Kong are all airlines based in Hong Kong.

Hong Kong International Airport was the eighth-busiest airport by passenger traffic pre-COVID and handles the most air-cargo traffic in the world.

Most private recreational aviation in Hong Kong, flies through Shek Kong Airfield, under the supervision of the Hong Kong Aviation Club.

==== Sea ====
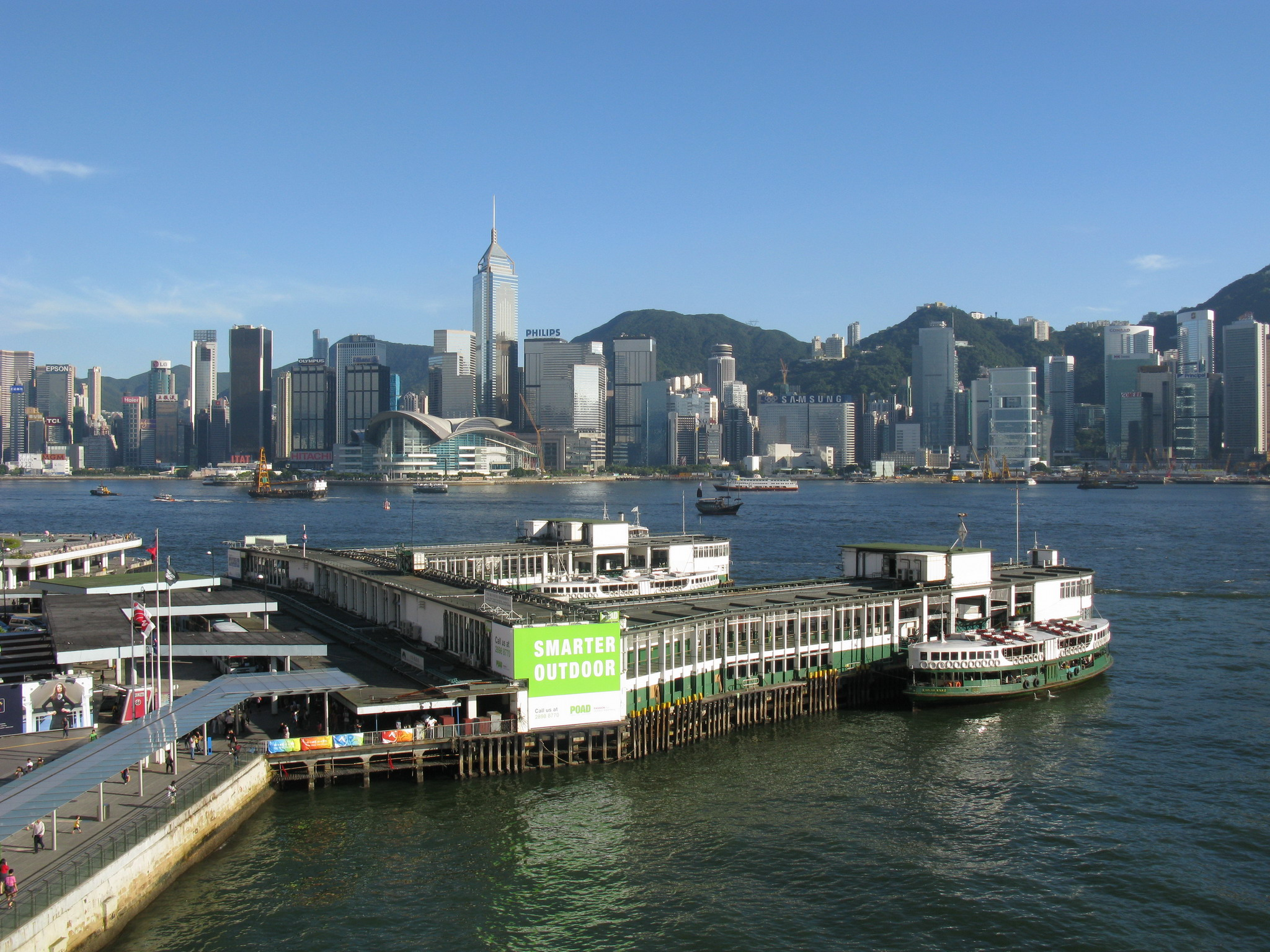
Tsim Sha Tsui Ferry Pier

The Port of Hong Kong, located by the South China Sea, is a deepwater seaport dominated by trade in containerised manufactured products. A key factor in the economic development of Hong Kong, the natural shelter and deep waters of Victoria Harbour provide ideal conditions for berthing and the handling of all types of vessels. It is one of the busiest ports in the world, in the three categories of shipping movements, cargo handled, and passengers carried. This makes Hong Kong a Large-Port Metropolis. The Star Ferry operates two lines across Victoria Harbour for its 53,000 daily passengers. Ferries also serve outlying islands inaccessible by other means. Smaller kai-to boats serve the most remote coastal settlements. Ferry travel to Macau and mainland China is also available. Junks, once common in Hong Kong waters, are no longer widely available and are used privately and for tourism. The large size of the port gives Hong Kong the classification of Large-Port Metropolis.

=== Utilities ===
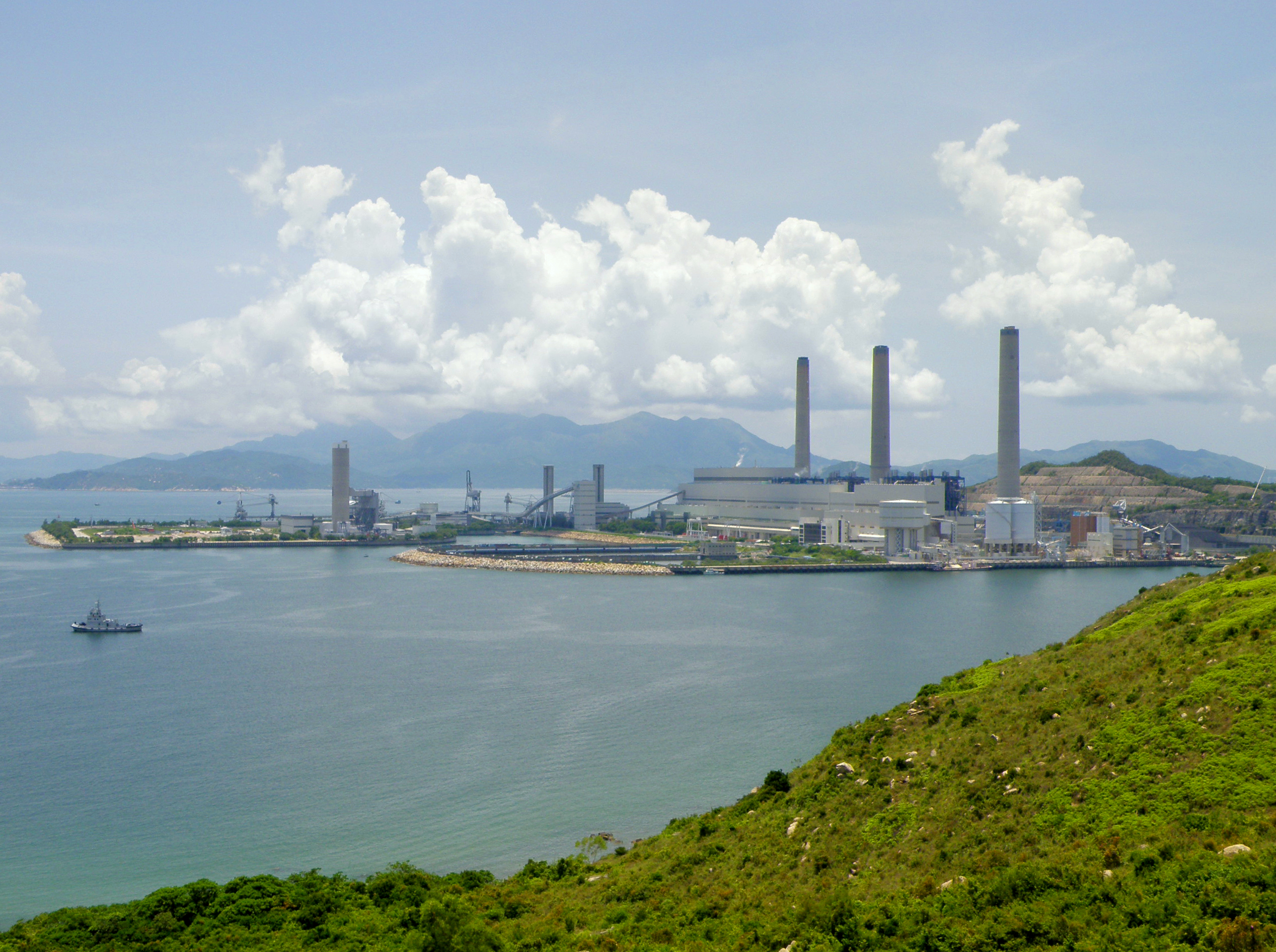
Lamma Power Station, a coal power plant on Lamma Island owned by Hongkong Electric

Hong Kong generates most of its electricity locally. The vast majority of this energy comes from fossil fuels, with 46% from coal and 47% from petroleum. The rest is from other imports, including nuclear energy generated in mainland China. Renewable sources account for a negligible amount of energy generated for the territory. Small-scale wind-power sources have been developed, and a small number of private homes and public buildings have installed solar panels.

With few natural lakes and rivers, high population density, inaccessible groundwater sources, and extremely seasonal rainfall, the territory lacks a reliable freshwater supply. The Dong River in Guangdong supplies 70% of the city's water, with the remaining demand met by harvesting rainwater locally. Toilets in most built-up areas of the territory flush with seawater, which reduces freshwater use.

Broadband Internet access is widely available, with 99.3% of households connected. Connections over fibre-optic infrastructure are increasingly prevalent, contributing to the high regional average connection speed of 21.9 Mbit/s (the world's fourth-fastest). Mobile-phone use is ubiquitous; there are almost 22 million mobile-phone accounts registered in Hong Kong, which is almost triple the territory's population.

== Culture ==
Hong Kong culture is characterised as a hybrid of Eastern and Western culture. Traditional Chinese values emphasising family and education blend with Western ideals, including economic liberty and the rule of law. Although the vast majority of the population is ethnically Chinese, Hong Kong has developed a distinct identity. The territory diverged from the mainland through its long period of colonial administration and a different pace of economic, social, and cultural development. Mainstream culture was derived from immigrants originating from various parts of China; it was then influenced by British-style education, a separate political system, and the territory's rapid development during the late 20th century. Most migrants of that era fled poverty and war, reflected in the prevailing attitude toward wealth; Hongkongers would tend to link self-image and decision-making to material benefits. Residents' sense of local identity has increased post-handover: polling in December 2022 had 32% of respondents identifying as "Hongkongers", 34.1% identifying as "Hongkongers in China" 45.9% purporting a "Mixed Identity", 20.5% identifying as "Chinese" and 11.9% identifying as "Chinese in Hong Kong".

Traditional Chinese family values, including family honour, filial piety, and a preference for sons, are prevalent. Nuclear families are the most common households, although multi-generational and extended families are not unusual. Spiritual concepts such as feng shui are observed; large-scale construction projects often hire consultants to ensure proper building positioning and layout. The degree of its adherence to feng shui is believed to determine a business's success. Bagua mirrors are regularly used to deflect evil spirits, and buildings often lack floor numbers with a 4; the number has a similar sound to the word for "die" in Cantonese.

=== Cuisine ===
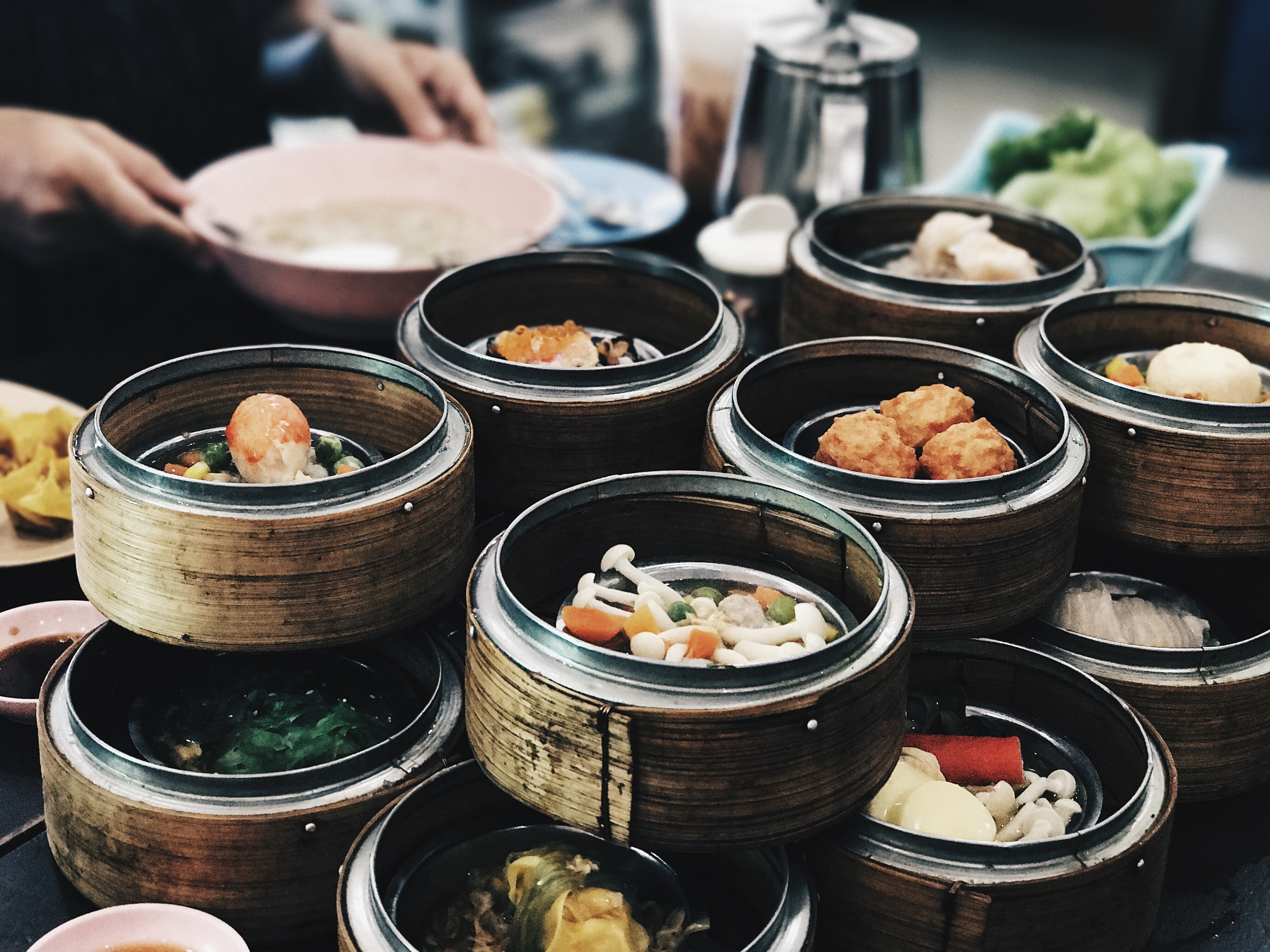
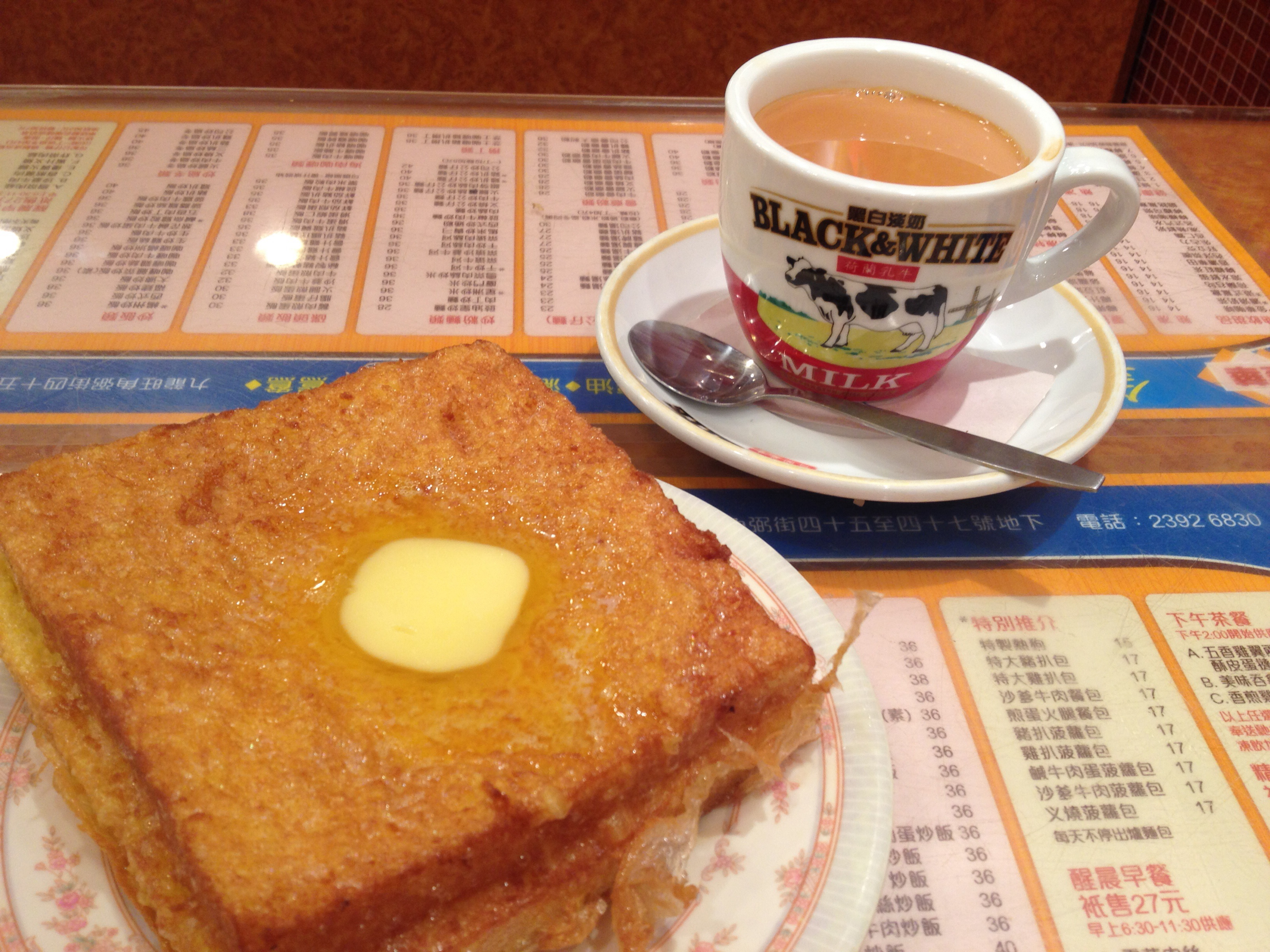
Typical fare at a dim sum restaurant (left); cha chaan teng breakfast food with Hong Kong-style milk tea (right)

Food in Hong Kong is primarily based on Cantonese cuisine, despite the territory's exposure to foreign influences and its residents' varied origins. Rice is the staple food and is usually served plain with other dishes. Freshness of ingredients is emphasised. Poultry and seafood are commonly sold live at wet markets, and ingredients are used as quickly as possible when still fresh. There are up to five daily meals: breakfast, lunch, afternoon tea, dinner, and siu yeh. Dim sum, as part of yum cha (brunch), is a dining-out tradition with family and friends. Dishes include congee, cha siu bao, siu yuk, egg tarts, and mango pudding. Local versions of Western food are served at cha chaan teng (Hong Kong-style cafes). Common cha chaan teng menu items include macaroni in soup, deep-fried French toast, and Hong Kong-style milk tea.

As of 2025, the Michelin Guide listed 76 starred restaurants in total. It awarded 7 restaurants 3 Michelin Stars, 11 restaurants with 2 Michelin Stars, and 58 restaurants with 1 Michelin Star. It also gave 4 Green Stars for sustainability: Amber, Feuille, Mora, and Roganic. Alongside the starred list, 65 restaurants received Bib Gourmand status for good quality food at good value.

=== Language ===
The predominant language today is Cantonese, a variety of Chinese originating in Guangzhou. It is spoken by 93.7% of the population, 88.2% as a first language and 5.5% as a second language. Slightly over half the population (58.7%) speaks English, the other official language; 4.6% are native speakers, and 54.1% speak English as a second language. Code-switching, mixing English and Cantonese in informal conversation, is common among the bilingual population. Post-handover governments have promoted Mandarin, which is currently about as prevalent as English; 54.2% of the population speaks Mandarin, with 2.3% native speakers and 51.9% as a second language. Traditional Chinese characters are used in writing, rather than the simplified characters used in the mainland.

Before the First Opium War, Hong Kong had no significant Cantonese-speaking population. Instead, most people spoke Hakka varieties. However, large areas with speakers of other Yue Chinese varieties, namely Weitou and Tanka, can be found in the northern New Territories and southern coastal areas, respectively. Hong Kong Hakka is a variety of Neo-Hakka, and belongs to the Mei-Hui Hakka subbranch of Yuetai Hakka, making it closely related to that of Meixian. Weitou Yue is a variety that is closely related to the Yue Chinese varieties spoken in Bao'an and Dongguan, and was the primary language of the Five Great Clans of the New Territories, brought into Hong Kong during the Song dynasty from Jiangxi. Some of the native Yue Chinese varieties were noticeably Hakka-influenced. Smaller communities of Hokkien speakers also existed, and many villages hosted more than one ethnolinguistic group.

Today, communities of speakers of other Chinese varieties (such as Teochew, Sze Yap, Hokkien, and Shanghainese) also live in Hong Kong. Southeast Asian languages such as Tagalog and Malay-Indonesian speaking communities also live in Hong Kong. Other minority languages with significant speaker bases in Hong Kong include French, Dutch, German, Italian, Spanish, Portuguese, Arabic, Hindustani, Japanese, and Korean, among others.

=== Cinema ===
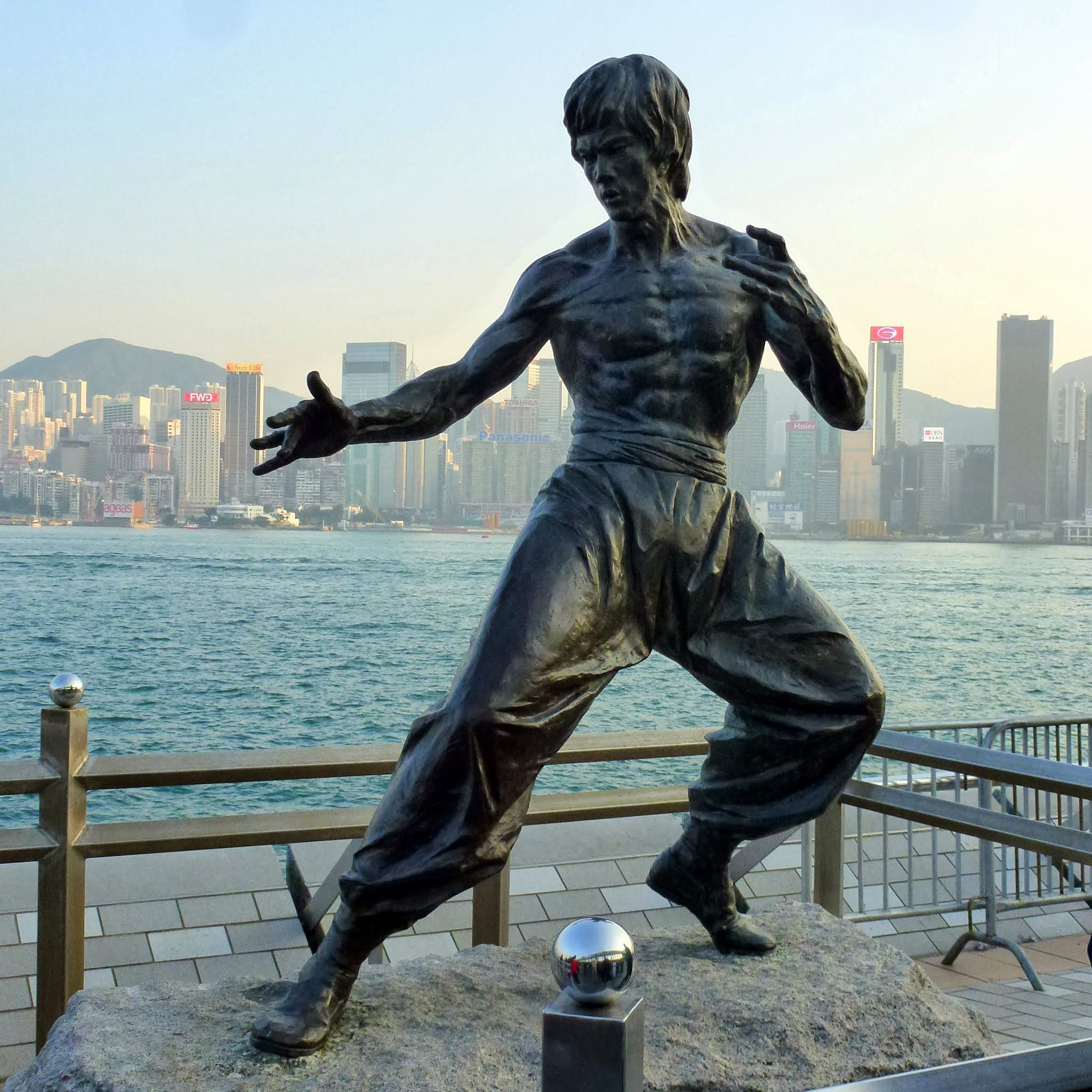
Statue of Bruce Lee on the Avenue of Stars, a tribute to the city's film industry

Hong Kong developed into a filmmaking hub during the late 1940s as a wave of Shanghai filmmakers migrated to the territory, and these movie veterans helped build the colony's entertainment industry over the next decade. By the 1960s, the city was well known to overseas audiences through films such as The World of Suzie Wong. When Bruce Lee's The Way of the Dragon was released in 1972 and Enter the Dragon in 1973, local productions became popular outside Hong Kong. During the 1980s and 1900s, films such as A Better Tomorrow, As Tears Go By, God of Gamblers, Police Story and Zu Warriors from the Magic Mountain expanded global interest beyond martial arts films; locally made gangster films, romantic dramas, and supernatural fantasies became popular.

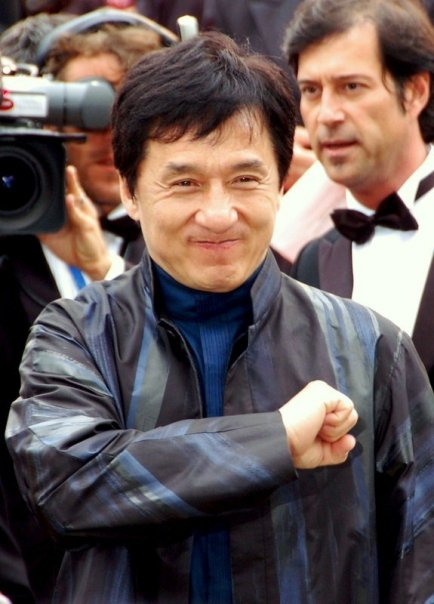
Jackie Chan

Hong Kong cinema continued to be internationally successful over the following decades with critically acclaimed movies and dramas such as Farewell My Concubine, To Live, Shaolin Soccer, Kung Fu Hustle, Ip Man, Drunken Master II, In the Mood for Love and Chungking Express. The city's martial arts film roots are evident in the roles of the most prolific Hong Kong actors. Bruce Lee, Jackie Chan, Stephen Chow, Jet Li, Chow Yun-fat, Donnie Yen, Tony Leung, Karen Mok, Maggie Q and Michelle Yeoh are some of the most popular and well-known actors and actresses. Hong Kong films have also grown popular in overseas markets such as Japan, South Korea, Indonesia, Taiwan and the US, earning the city the moniker "Hollywood of the East". At the height of the local movie industry in the early 1990s, over 400 films were produced each year; since then, industry momentum has shifted to mainland China. The number of films produced annually has declined to about 60 in 2017.

=== Music ===
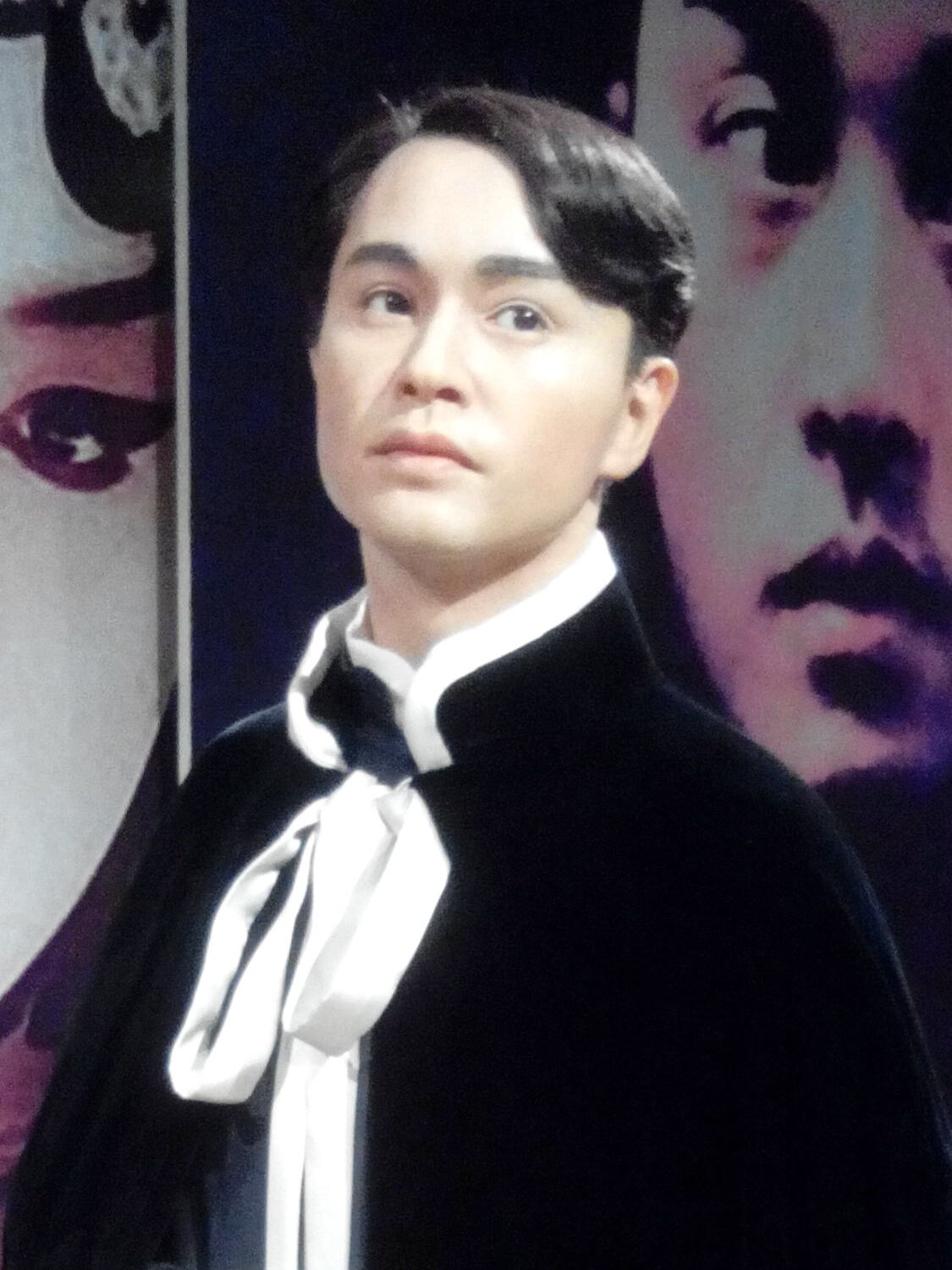
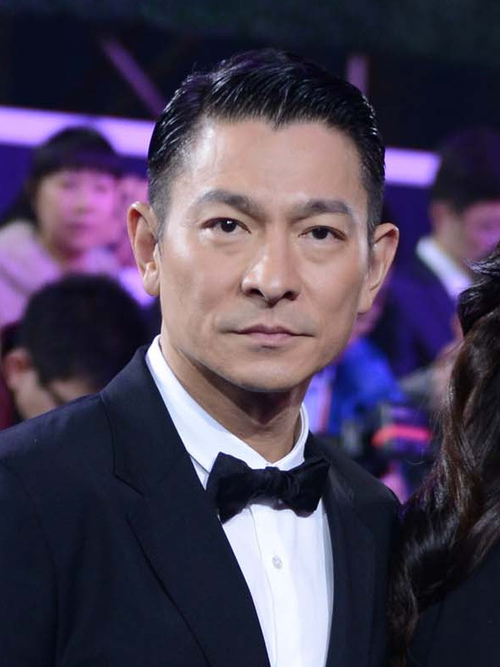
Leslie Cheung (left) is considered a pioneering Cantopop artist, and Andy Lau has been an icon of Hong Kong music and film for several decades as a member of the Four Heavenly Kings.

Cantopop is a genre of Cantonese popular music which emerged in Hong Kong during the 1970s. Evolving from Shanghai-style shidaiqu, it is also influenced by Cantonese opera and Western pop. Local media featured songs by artists and bands such as Sam Hui, Anita Mui, Leslie Cheung, Alan Tam, Hacken Lee and Beyond; during the 1980s, exported films and shows exposed Cantopop to a global audience. The genre's popularity peaked in the 1990s, when the Four Heavenly Kings dominated Asian record charts. Despite a general decline since late in the decade, Cantopop remains dominant in Hong Kong; contemporary artists such as Eason Chan, Jackson Wang, Joey Yung, G.E.M., Tyson Yoshi, Twins and Mirror are popular in the territory and around the world.

Western classical music has historically had a strong presence in Hong Kong and remains a large part of local musical education. The publicly funded Hong Kong Philharmonic Orchestra, the territory's oldest professional symphony orchestra, frequently hosts musicians and conductors from all over the world. The Hong Kong Chinese Orchestra, composed of classical Chinese instruments, is the leading Chinese ensemble and plays a significant role in promoting traditional music in the city.

Hong Kong has never had a separate national anthem from the country that controlled it; its current official national anthem is therefore that of the People's Republic of China, "March of the Volunteers". The song "Glory to Hong Kong" has been used by protestors as an unofficial anthem of the city.

=== Galleries and museums ===
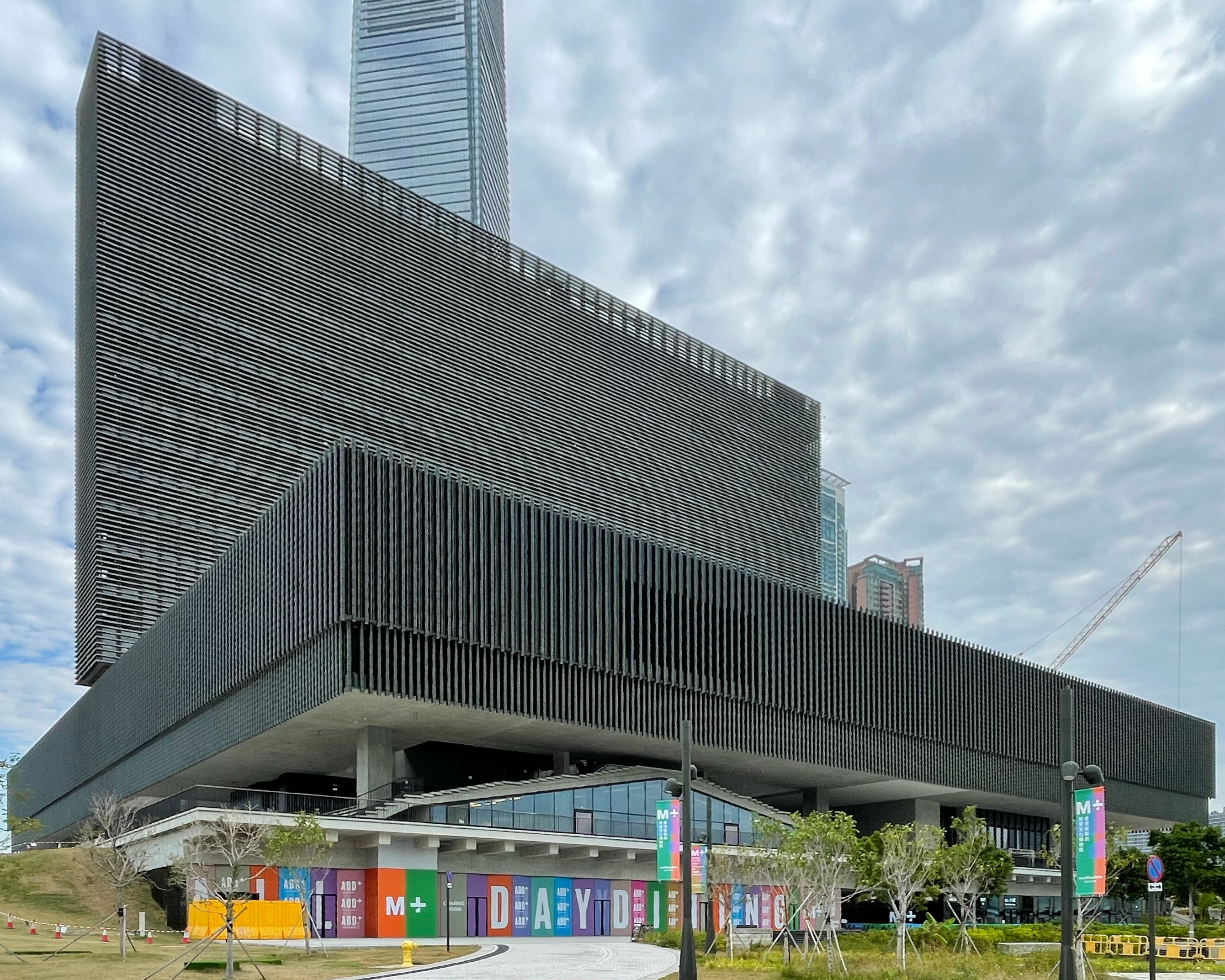
M+

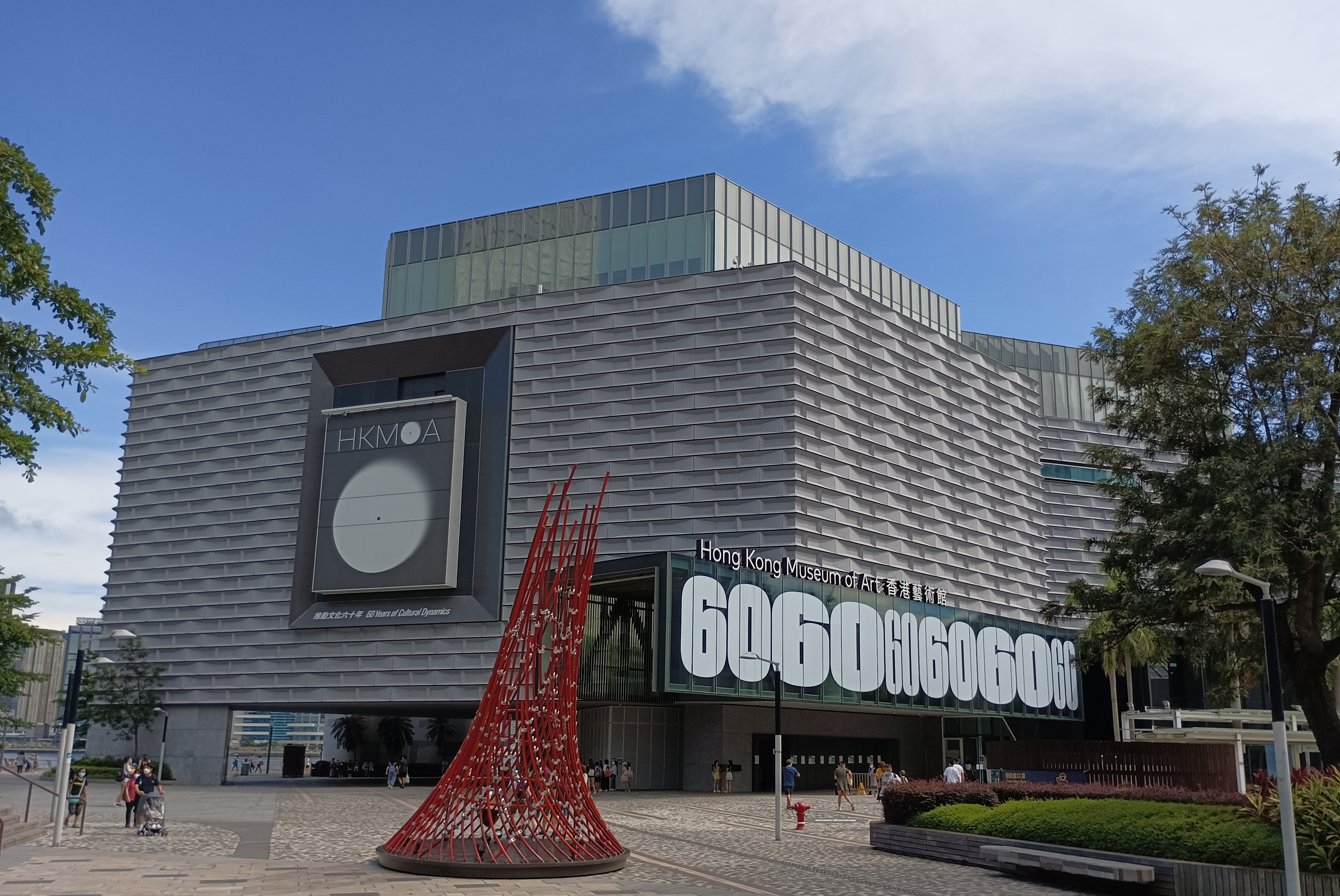
Hong Kong Museum of Art

Hong Kong is home to a wide range of museums, galleries, and cultural institutions, and is regarded as one of Asia's leading centres for art, heritage, and visual culture. Major cultural development in the city has taken place in the West Kowloon Cultural District, a large arts and museum quarter on reclaimed land in Kowloon. Its best-known institutions include M+, a museum of visual culture focused on 20th and 21st-century art, design, architecture, and moving image, and the Hong Kong Palace Museum, which displays Chinese artworks and artifacts. Apart from West Kowloon, Hong Kong has many additional museums across the territory. The Hong Kong Museum of Art in Tsim Sha Tsui houses collections of Chinese antiquities, calligraphy, painting, and Hong Kong art. The Hong Kong Heritage Museum in Sha Tin focuses on history, art, and local popular culture, with exhibitions on Cantonese opera, film, and design. The Hong Kong Museum of History presents the development of Hong Kong from prehistoric times to the present, while the Hong Kong Science Museum and Hong Kong Space Museum are among the city's main public institutions devoted to science and education. Tai Kwun, a former police station and prison compound in Central, has been revitalised as a centre for heritage and contemporary art, and hosts exhibitions, performances, and public programmes.

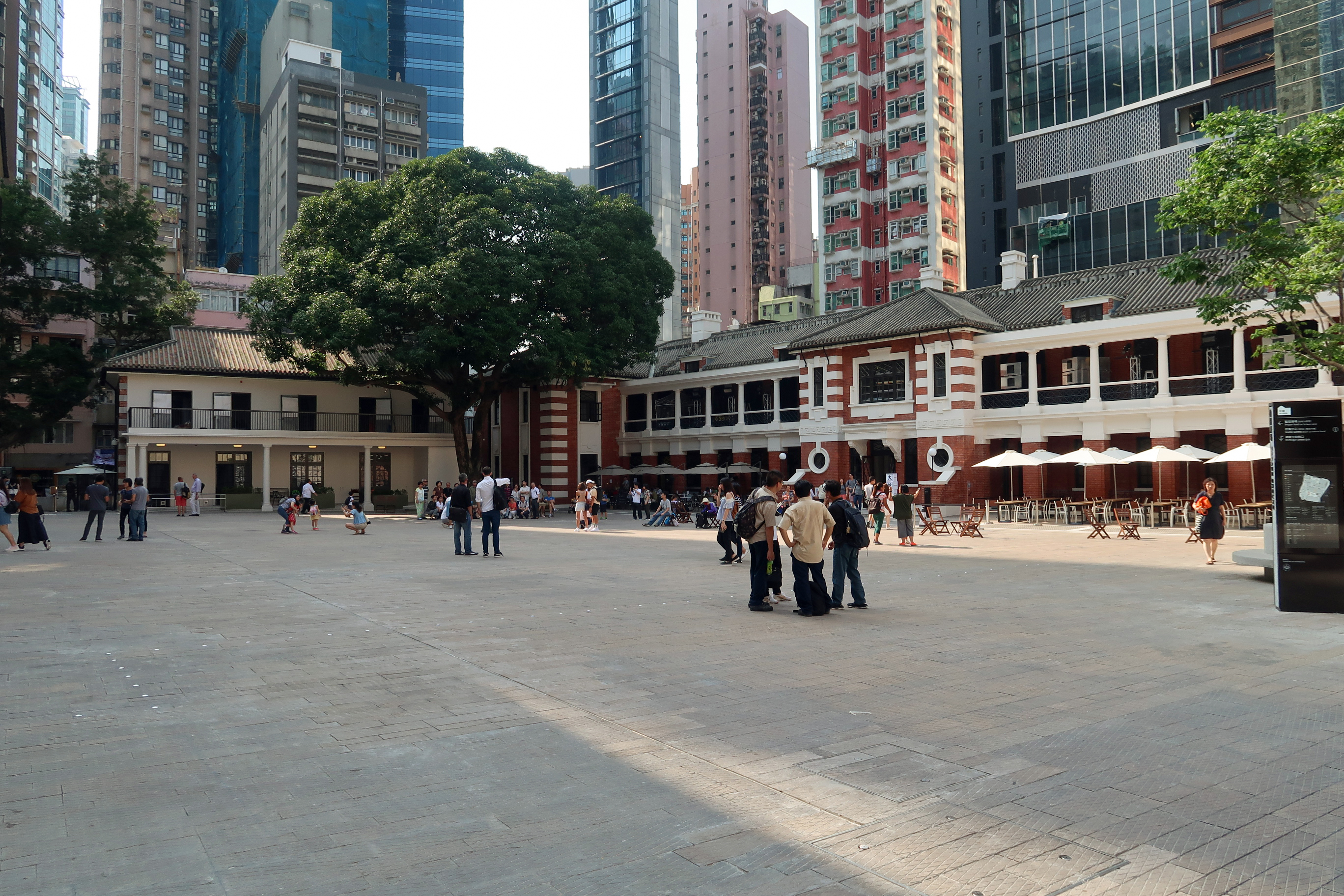
Tai Kwun

Hong Kong also has a large commercial and independent gallery scene. Central district has long been the city's main gallery district, with international auction houses and global galleries operating alongside local art spaces. Wong Chuk Hang has developed into another important arts area, with former industrial buildings converted into galleries, studios, and exhibition venues. The city hosts major international art events, including Art Basel Hong Kong and Art Central, which attract galleries, collectors, and artists from around the world.

=== Sport ===
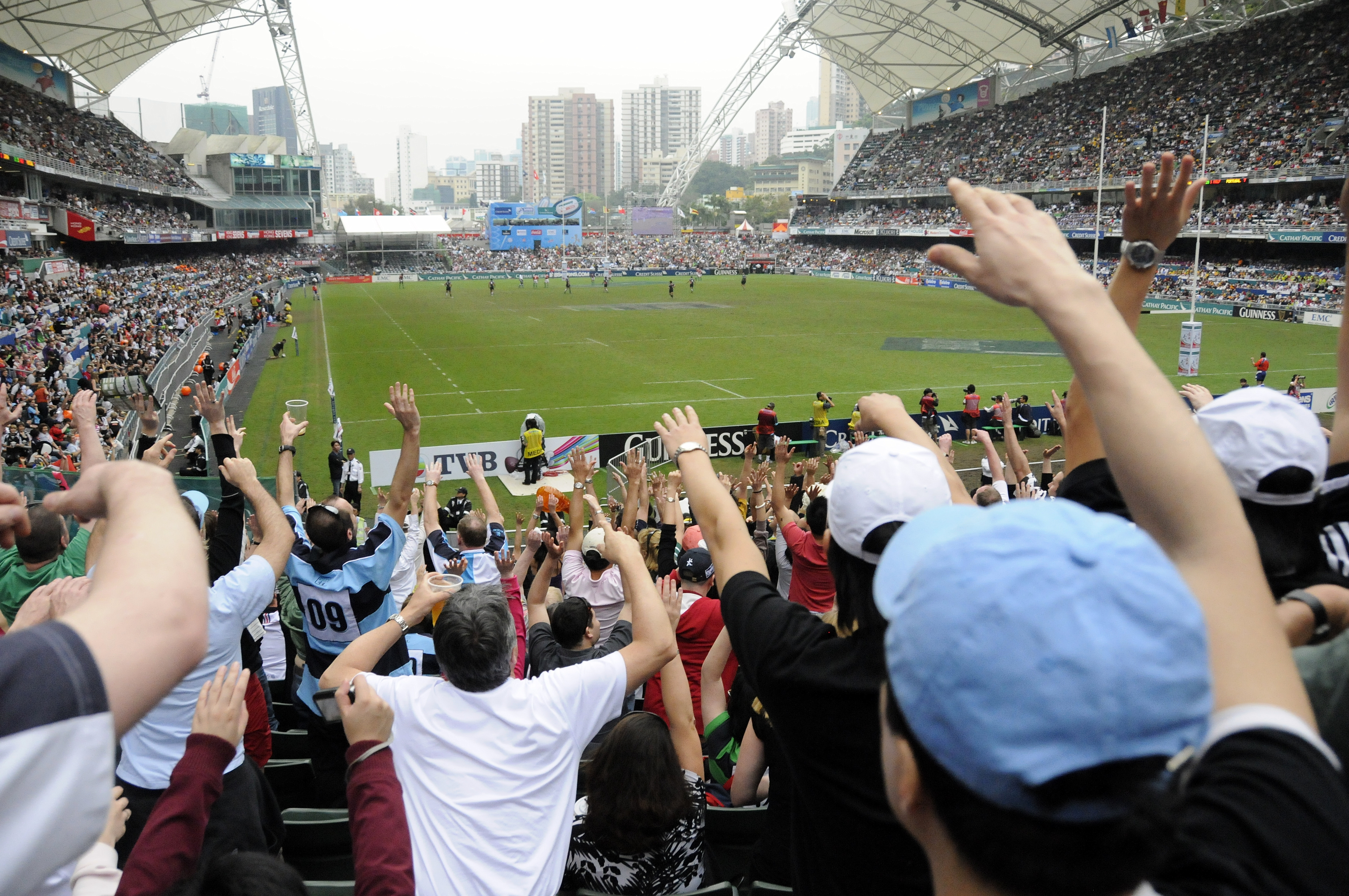
The Hong Kong Sevens, considered the premier tournament of the World Rugby Sevens Series

The city has hosted numerous major sporting events, including the inaugural AFC Asian Cup, the 2008 Summer Olympics equestrian events, the 2009 East Asian Games, the Rugby World Cup Sevens in 1997 and 2005, the 2005 World Squash Championships and 2025 World Grand Prix (snooker).

The territory regularly hosts the Hong Kong Sevens, Hong Kong Marathon, Hong Kong Open (tennis), Hong Kong Tennis Classic and LIV Golf Hong Kong. Hong Kong represents itself separately from mainland China, with its own sports teams in international competitions. The territory has participated in almost every Summer Olympics since 1952 (with the exception of its support of the 1980 Summer Olympics boycott) and has earned nine medals. Lee Lai-shan won the territory's first Olympic gold medal at the 1996 Atlanta Olympics, and Cheung Ka Long won the second one in Tokyo 2020. Hong Kong athletes have won 126 medals at the Paralympic Games and 17 at the Commonwealth Games. Although they are no longer part of the Commonwealth of Nations, the city's last appearance was in 1994.

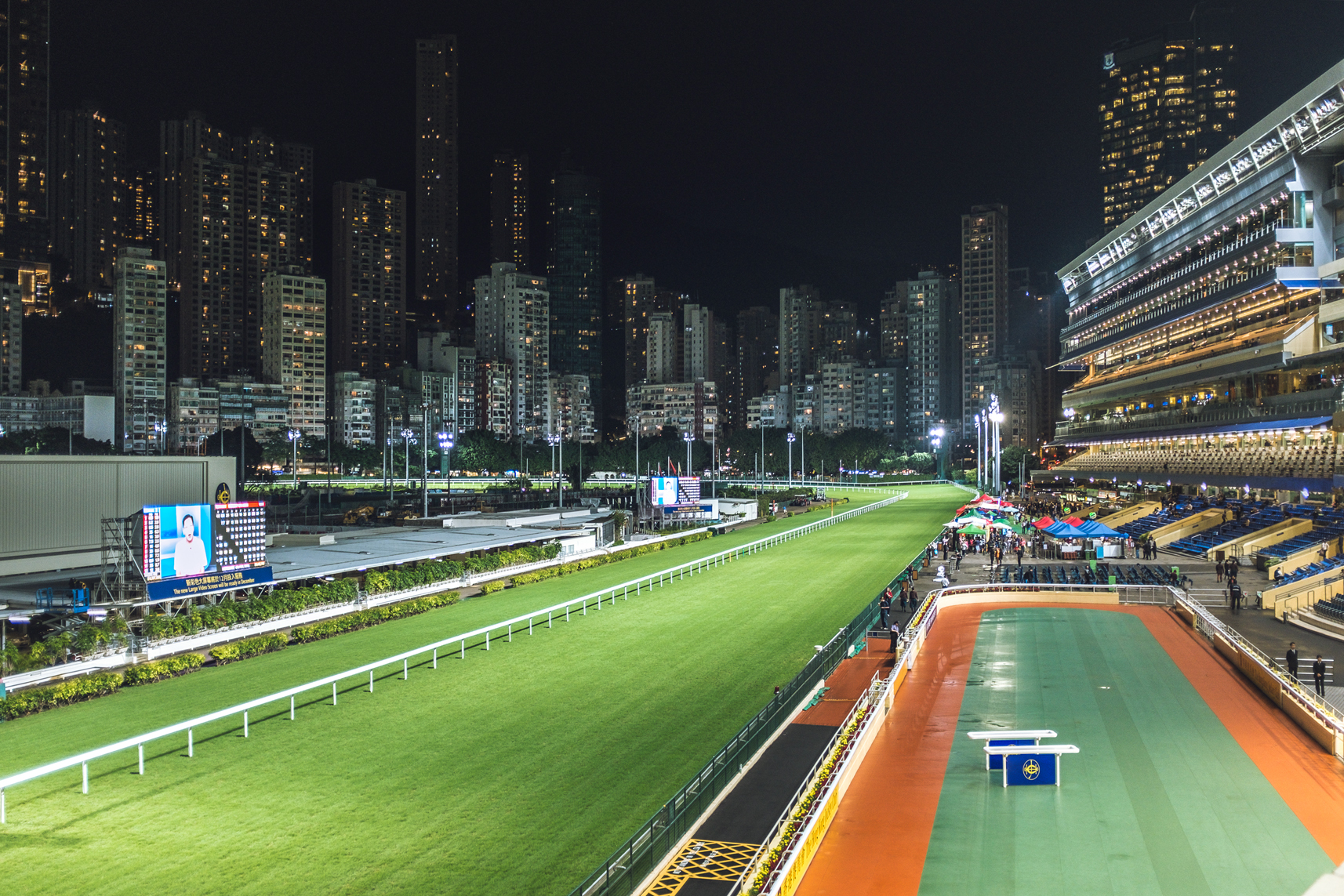
Happy Valley Racecourse and Hong Kong Jockey Club

Sporting leagues in Hong Kong include Hong Kong Premier League, Hong Kong Premiership (rugby union), Hong Kong A1 Division Championship, and the Hong Kong Ice Hockey League. Famous local sporting clubs include Hong Kong Football Club, South China Athletic Association, Kitchee SC, and Hong Kong Eastern.

Hong Kong sports have been described as "Club Life". Some clubs have documented their history thoroughly, while others have disappeared along with their past.

- Hong Kong Cricket Club
- Craigengower Cricket Club
- Kowloon Cricket Club
- Kowloon Bowling Green Club
- Indian Recreation Club
- Chinese Recreation Club
- Filipino Club
- United Services Recreation Club
- Club de Recreio
- Club Lusitano
- Royal Hong Kong Yacht Club
- Aberdeen Boat Club

Dragon boat races originated as a religious ceremony conducted during the annual Tuen Ng Festival. The race was revived as a modern sport as part of the Tourism Board's efforts to promote Hong Kong's image abroad. The first modern competition was organised in 1976, and overseas teams began competing in the first international race in 1993.

The Hong Kong Jockey Club, the territory's largest taxpayer, has a monopoly on gambling and provides over 7% of government revenue. Three forms of gambling are legal in Hong Kong: lotteries, horse racing, and football.

=== Entertainment and leisure ===
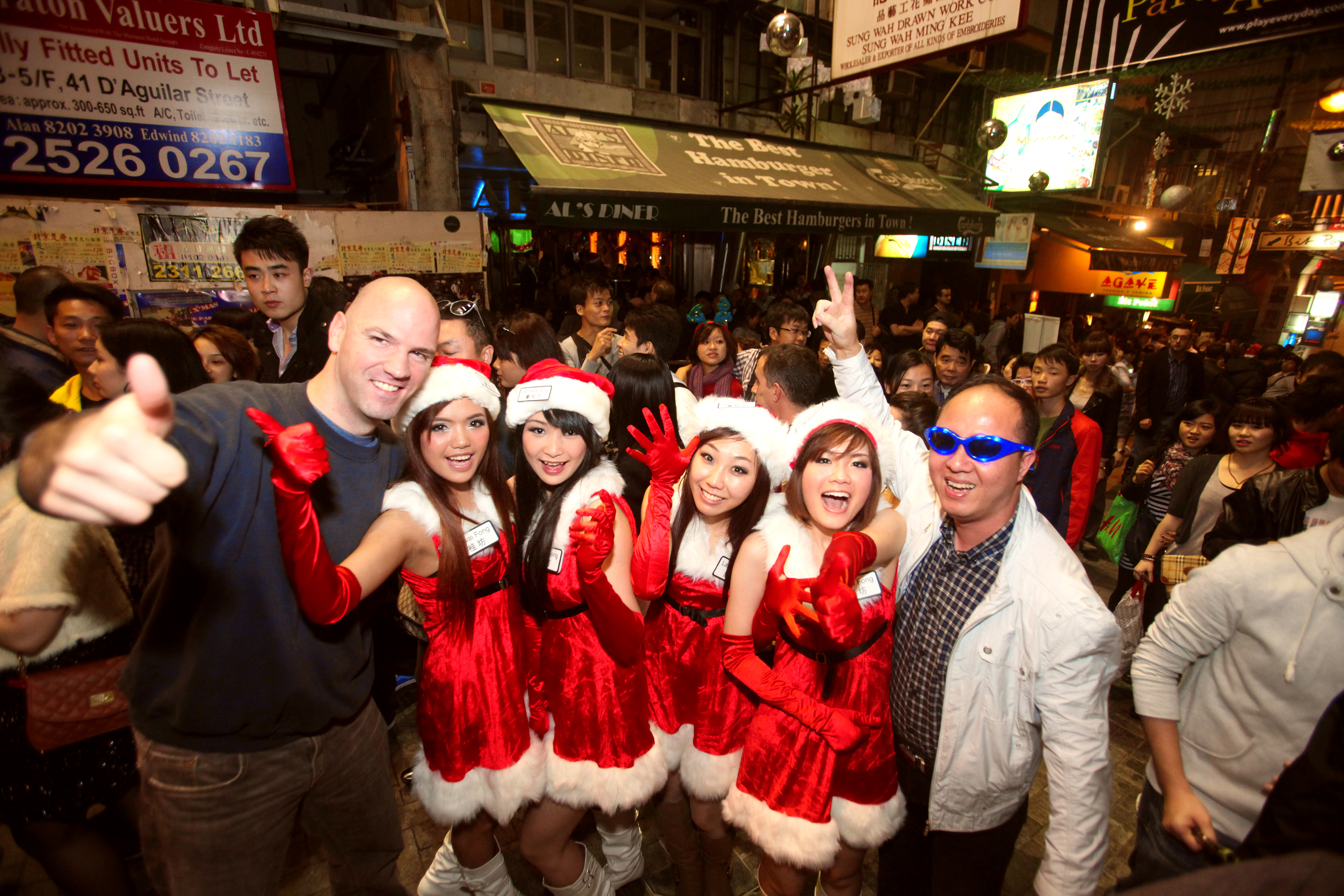
Lan Kwai Fong

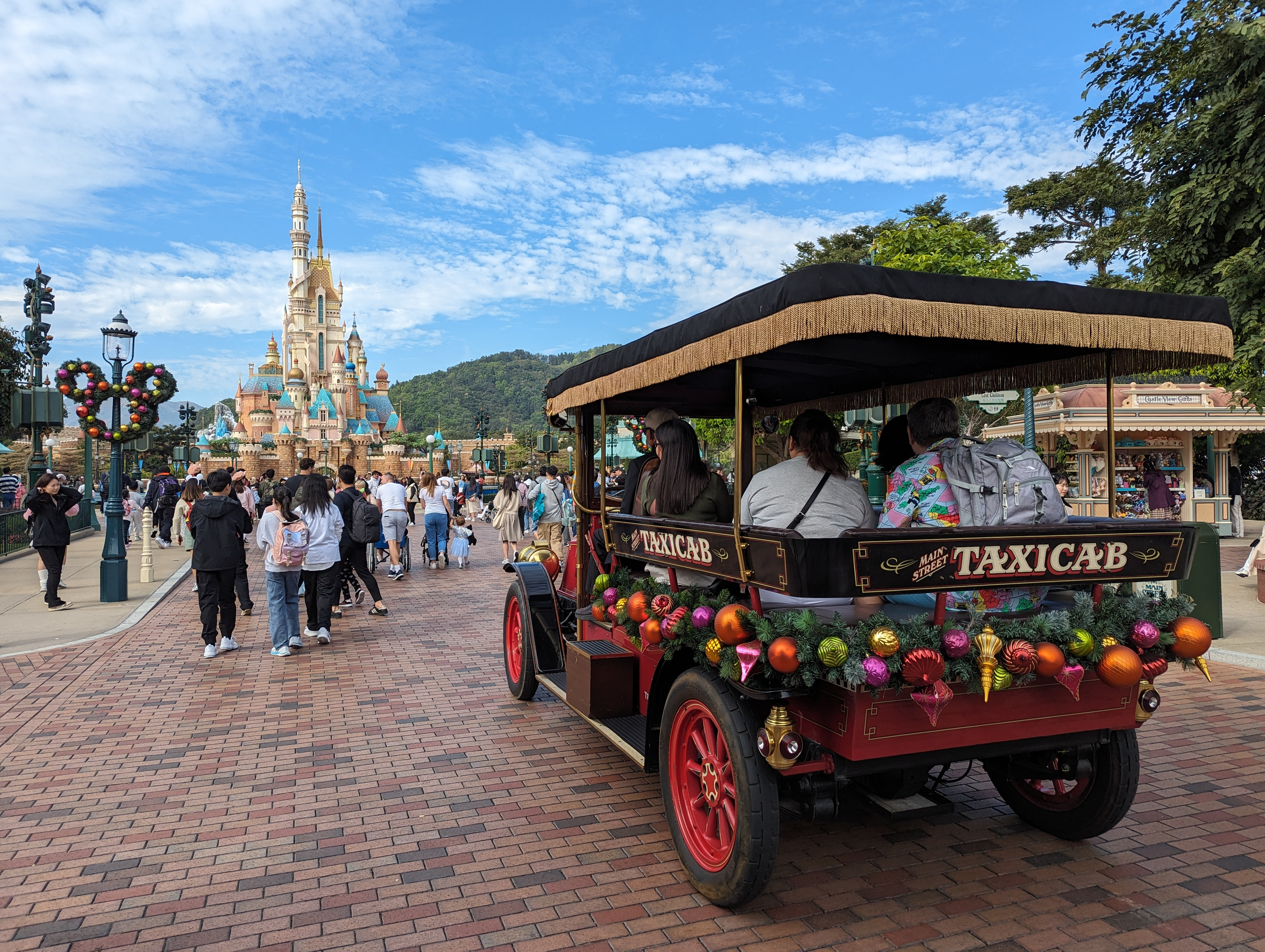
Hong Kong Disneyland

Hong Kong has two theme parks. Hong Kong Disneyland on Lantau Island is a major theme park and resort destination. Ocean Park Hong Kong combines rides and animal exhibits, with zones across the Waterfront and Summit areas.

For big events, Kai Tak Sports Park anchors the city's newest entertainment hub, built on the former airport site, with a 50,000-seat main stadium and a retractable roof. Hong Kong Stadium remains a key venue for football and major fixtures in Causeway Bay, with a capacity of 40,116. AsiaWorld-Expo near the airport hosts concerts, exhibitions, and large-scale conventions across multiple halls and an arena-style space. Hong Kong Convention and Exhibition Centre is the core waterfront venue in Wan Chai for exhibitions, meetings, and shows.

== Spectator sports ==
=== Badminton ===
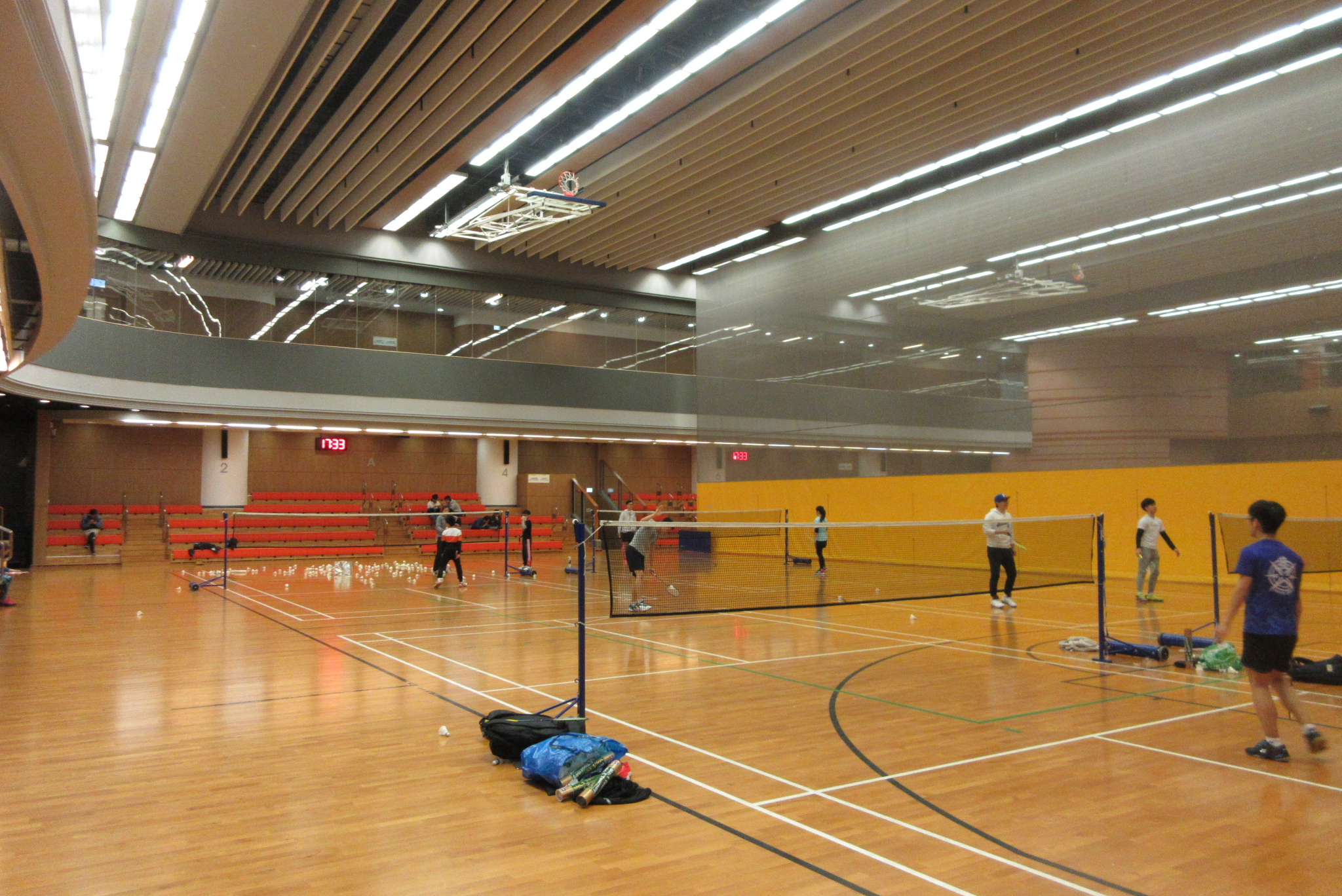
Tiu Keng Leng Sports Centre Badminton courts

Badminton stands as one of the most popular and historically significant sports in Hong Kong, governed by the Badminton Association of Hong Kong, China, since its establishment in 1934. The sport is designated as a Tier A elite discipline at the Hong Kong Sports Institute, which provides world-class training and scientific support to the national squad. This institutional backing has allowed the city to consistently produce top-tier talent capable of competing at the BWF World Tour and the Olympic Games.

The current professional landscape is highlighted by the mixed doubles pairing of Tang Chun-man and Tse Ying-suet, who achieved a career-high world ranking of number two. The duo remains a dominant force on the international circuit, recently securing a historic gold medal at the 2025 Badminton Asia Championships and a podium finish at the 2026 All England Open. In the men's singles discipline, Ng Ka-long Angus has been a mainstay of the global top ten, reaching a peak ranking of number six. He is supported by teammate Lee Cheuk-yiu. This former Hong Kong Open champion has maintained a strong international presence with a career-high ranking of thirteen. On the local front, the sport enjoys immense participation through a robust network of community clubs and school programs. The annual Hong Kong Open, a BWF World Tour Super 500 event, is held at the Hong Kong Coliseum.

=== Basketball ===
Basketball is one of the most popular sports in Hong Kong, with the A1 Division Championship serving as the city's top-tier amateur league since 1954. Historically, the sport gained regional prominence through the success of clubs like Regal, which won the 1997 ABC Champions Cup, and more recently, Hong Kong Eastern.

=== Cricket ===
Cricket in Hong Kong has been played since at least 1841. Like most cricketing nations, it was part of the British Empire. The national cricket team has been active since 1866, and the Hong Kong Cricket Association was granted associate membership of the International Cricket Council (ICC) in 1969. Hong Kong hosted the Hong Kong Cricket Sixes, an ICC-sanctioned event that features teams of six players in a six-over competition annually till 2012. The Hong Kong Cricket Team qualified for 2014 ICC World Twenty20 and caused a major upset by defeating hosts Bangladesh.

=== Fencing ===
The sport reached its peak during the 2020 and 2024 Olympic Games. Cheung Ka-long became a national icon by winning back-to-back gold medals in men's individual foil, while Vivian Kong secured gold in women's individual épée in Paris 2024.

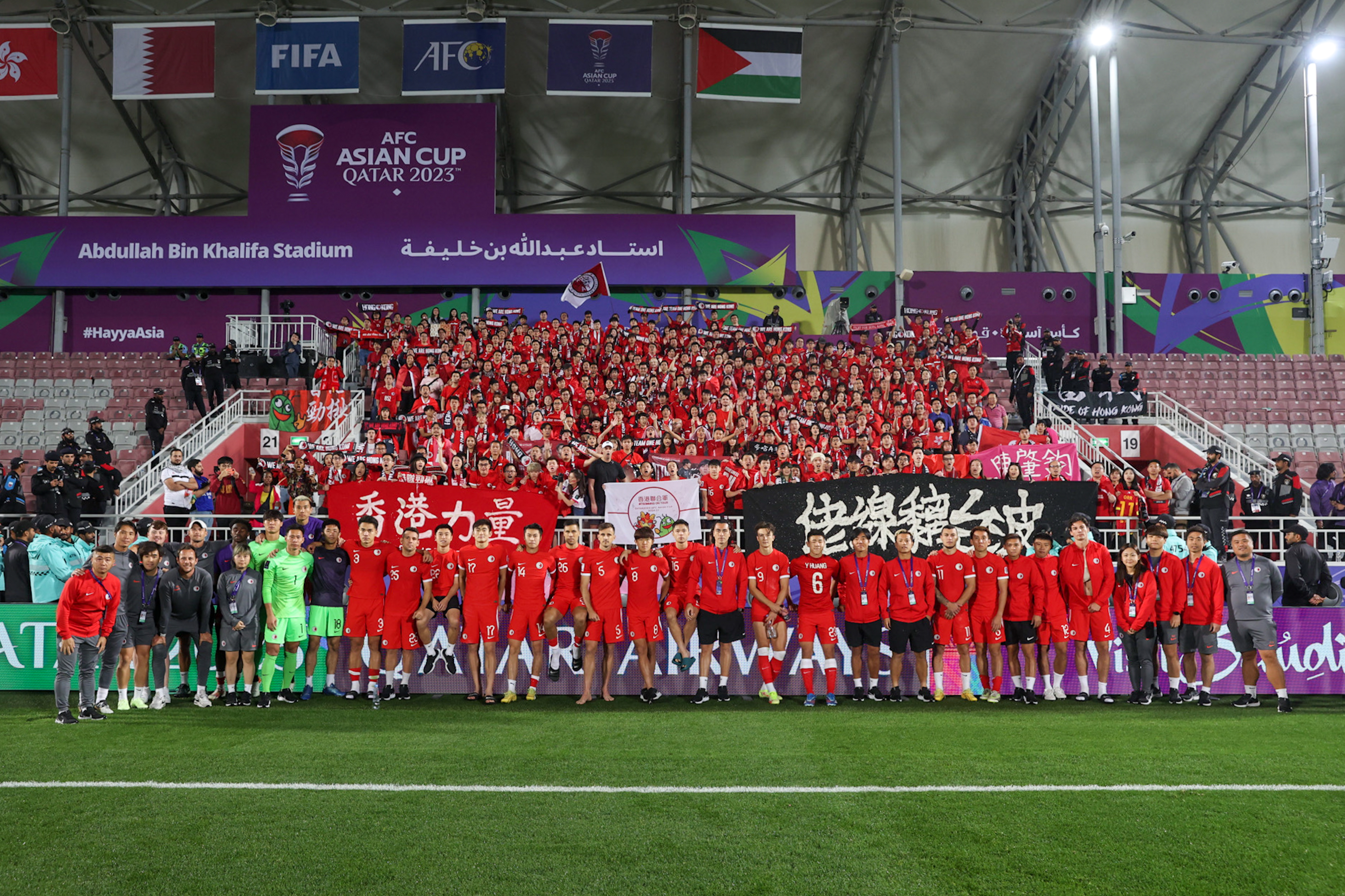
Hong Kong National Football Team

=== Football ===
Football is one of the most popular sports in Hong Kong, with the Hong Kong Premier League being the only fully professional sports league in the city.

Hong Kong has never qualified for the FIFA World Cup. They hosted the first AFC Asian Cup in 1956 and won third place, also reaching the semifinals in 1964. Hong Kong did not qualify for another AFC tournament until 2023. They have also qualified for the EAFF E-1 Football Championship five times, in 2003, 2010, 2019, 2022 and 2025.

Hong Kong also hosted and won the inaugural FIFA ASEAN Challenge Cup in 2026.

=== Horse racing ===
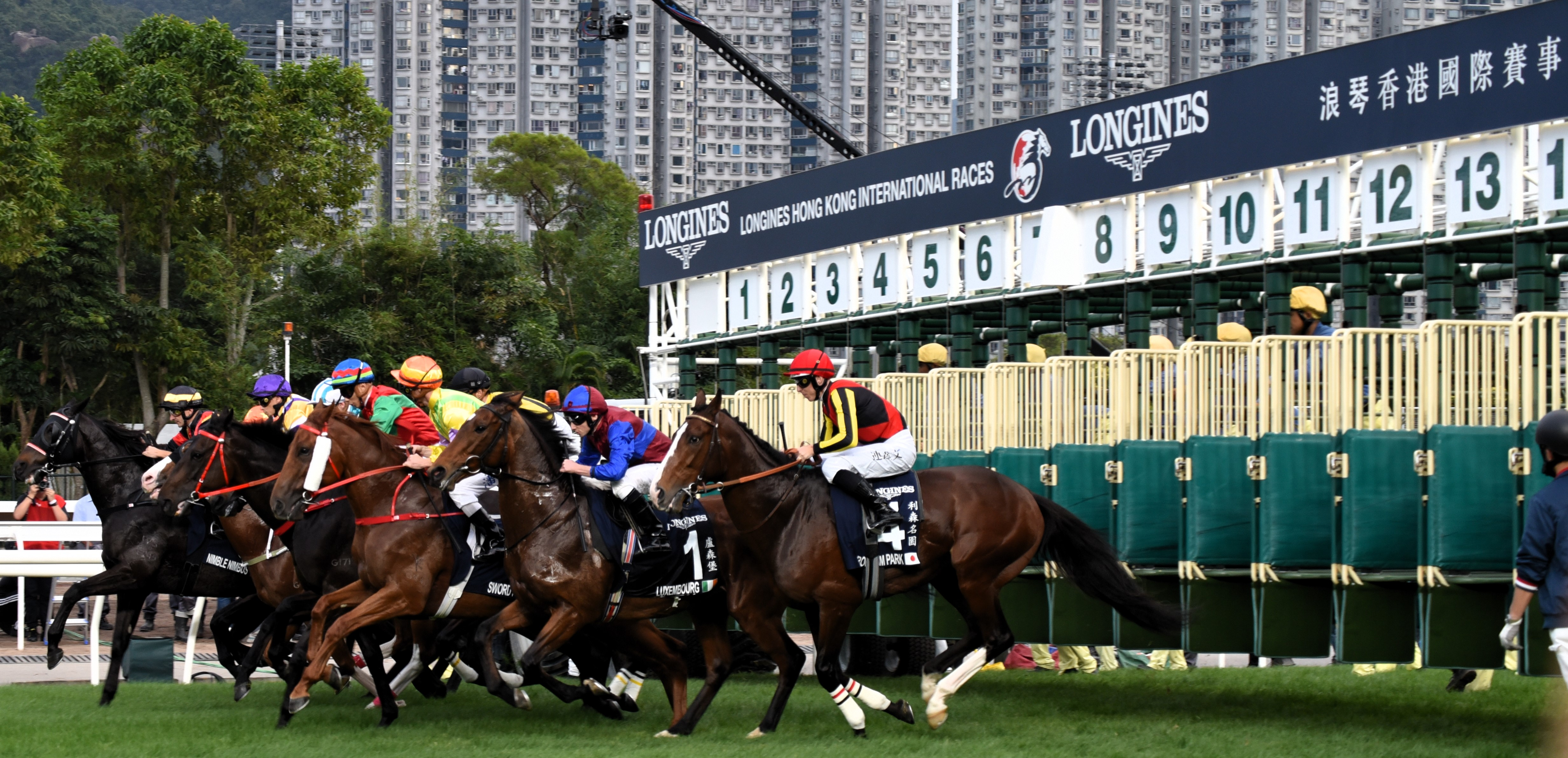
Longines Hong Kong International Races

Horse racing is by far the most popular spectator sport in Hong Kong and generates the largest horse race gambling turnover in the world. British tradition left its mark as one of the most important entertainment and gambling institutions in Hong Kong. Established as the Royal Hong Kong Jockey Club in 1884, the non-profit organization conducts nearly 700 races every season at the two race tracks in Happy Valley and Sha Tin. The sport annually draws in over 11% of Hong Kong's tax revenue. Off-track betting is available from overseas bookmakers. In 2009, betting on horse races generated an average US$12.7 million in gambling turnover per race, 6 times larger than its closest rival France at US$2 million, while the United States only generated $250,000. Some consider betting on horse races an investment.

=== Rugby union ===
The Hong Kong Rugby Football Union was founded in 1953. Rugby is long established, partly as a result of its being a British colony.

Hong Kong Sevens is held annually in Hong Kong and is considered the premier tournament on the World Rugby Sevens Series competition.

Hong Kong national rugby union team is ranked 23rd in the world with a peak rating of 21st (2018–2022). Hong Kong is one of the best teams in Asia and has finished first in the Asia Rugby Championship in 2018, 2019, 2022, 2023, 2024, and 2025. They qualified for the 2027 Rugby World Cup for the first time by winning the 2025 Asia Rugby Championship.

The Hong Kong national rugby sevens team is widely regarded as the best rugby sevens team in Asia and a regular participant in the Rugby World Cup Sevens. Hong Kong has won the Asian Sevens Series a record 8 times and the Asian Games 3 times.

== Education ==
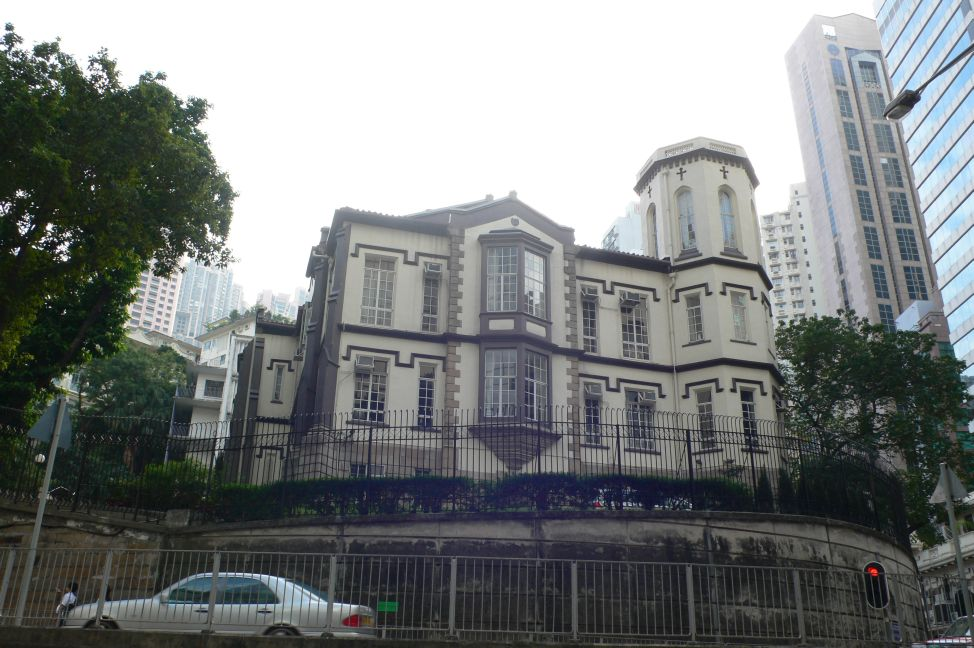
Former campus of St. Paul's College, the first school established in the colonial era

Education in Hong Kong is managed primarily by the Education Bureau. It is largely modelled on that of the United Kingdom, particularly the English system. Children are required to attend school from age 6 until the completion of secondary education, generally at age 18. At the end of secondary schooling, local school students take a public examination and are awarded the Hong Kong Diploma of Secondary Education upon successful completion of the exam.

Of residents aged 15 and older, 81% completed lower-secondary education, 66% graduated from an upper secondary school, 32% attended a non-degree tertiary program, and 24% earned a bachelor's degree or higher.

Mandatory education within the city has contributed to an adult literacy rate of around 99.9%.

Comprehensive schools fall into three categories: government-run public schools; subsidised schools, including government-aided and grant schools; and private schools, often run by religious organisations, that base admissions on academic merit. These schools are subject to the Education Bureau's curriculum guidelines. Private schools subsidised under the Direct Subsidy Scheme, and international schools fall outside of this system and may elect to use differing curricula and teach using other languages.

Hong Kong students perform exceptionally well in global benchmarks. In PISA 2022 (latest available results), Hong Kong ranked in the top tier worldwide: 4th in mathematics and top 10 in reading and science. This places it well above the OECD average and among the highest-performing systems globally.

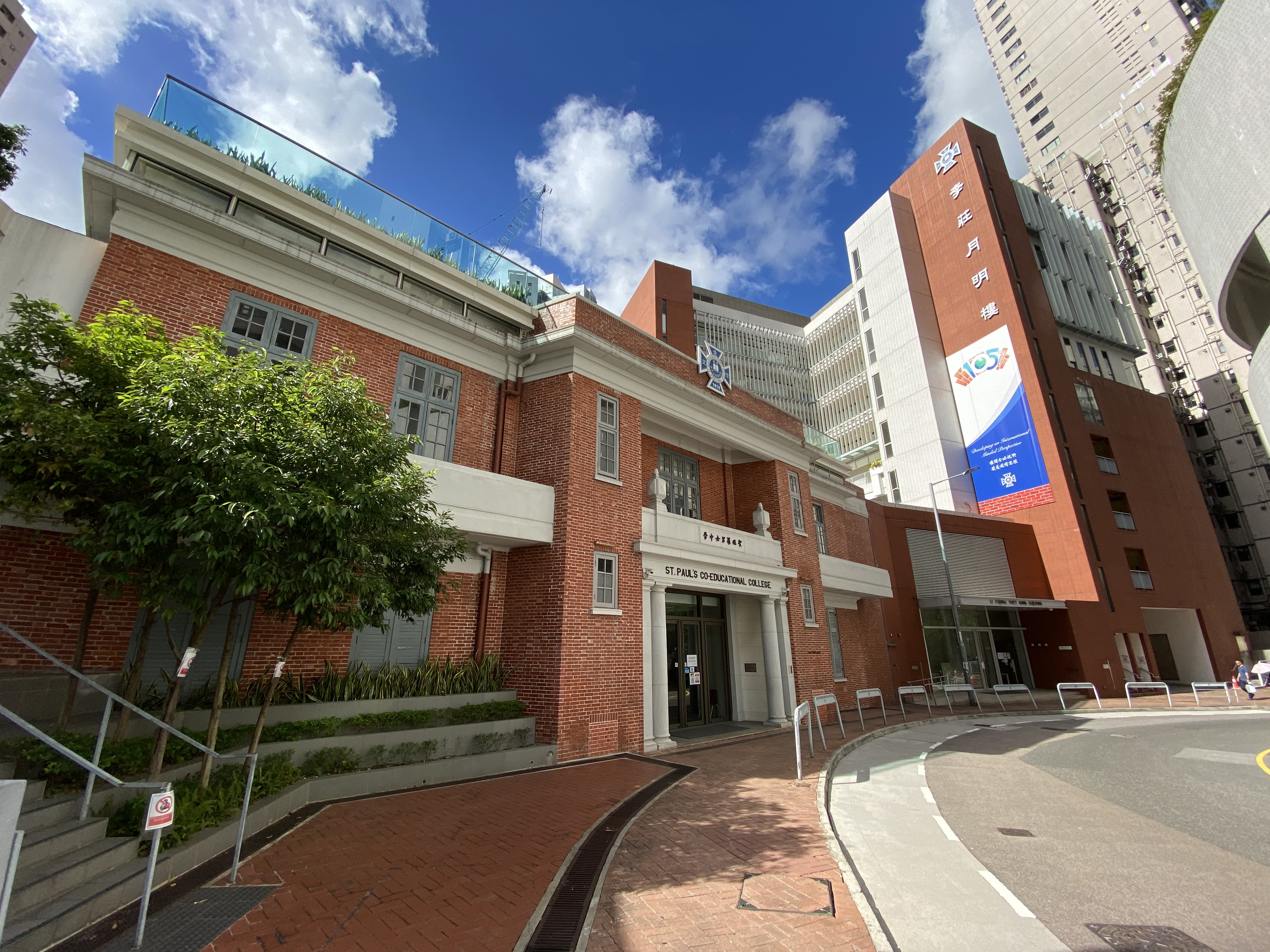
St. Paul's Co-educational College

Secondary schools in Hong Kong offer a wide range of curricula. Apart from the Hong Kong Diploma of Secondary Education, international curricula such as the International Baccalaureate, GCE A-level, IGCSEs, and Advanced Placement are prevalent.

Hong Kong secondary schools offer world-class education, with top-tier, high-ranking schools such as St Paul's Co-educational College, ranked 2nd in Global Top IB Schools 2025 with a 42.4 average score. While schools such as Diocesan Boys' School and German Swiss International School respectively also rank within the top 10.

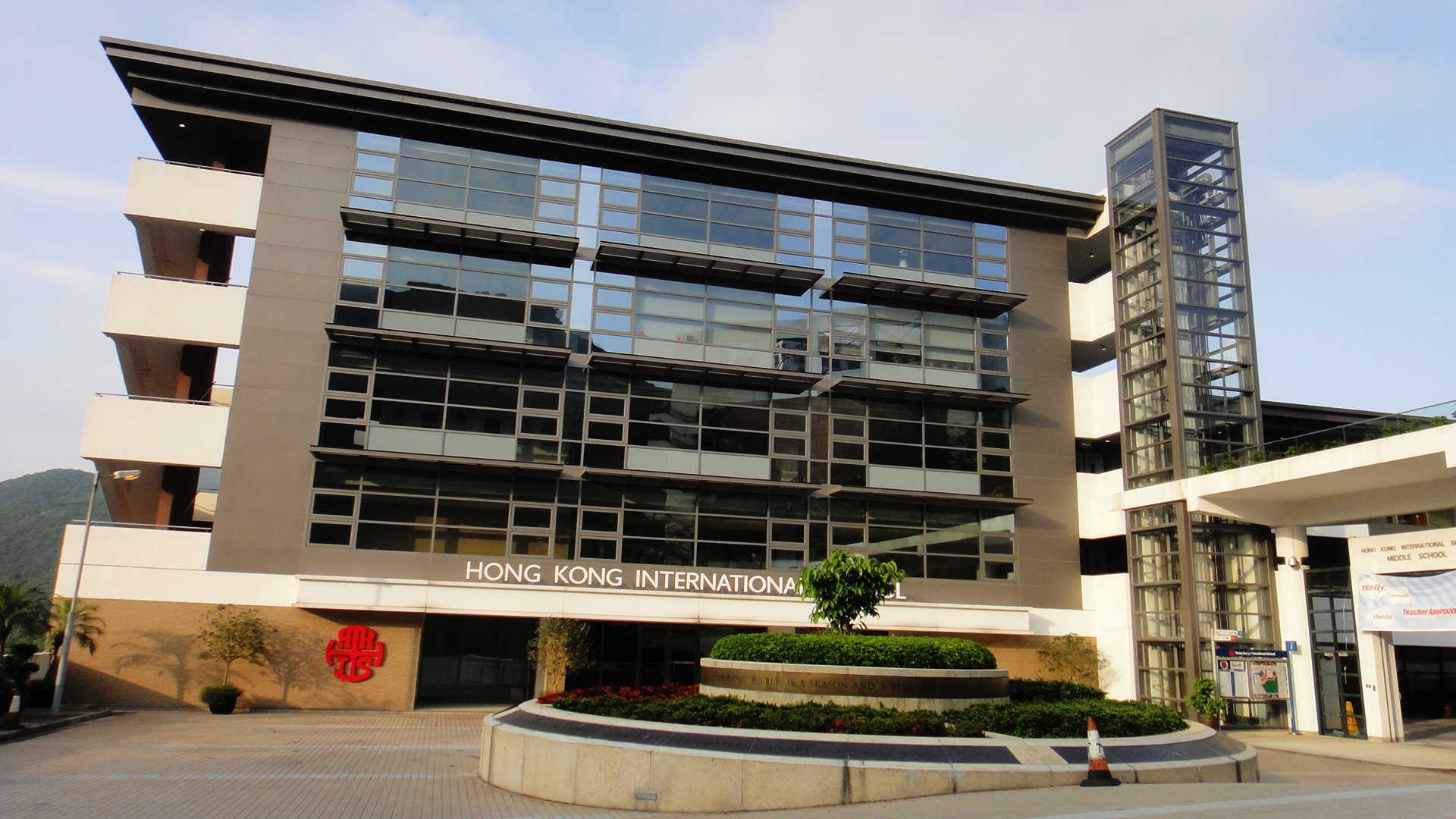
Hong Kong International School

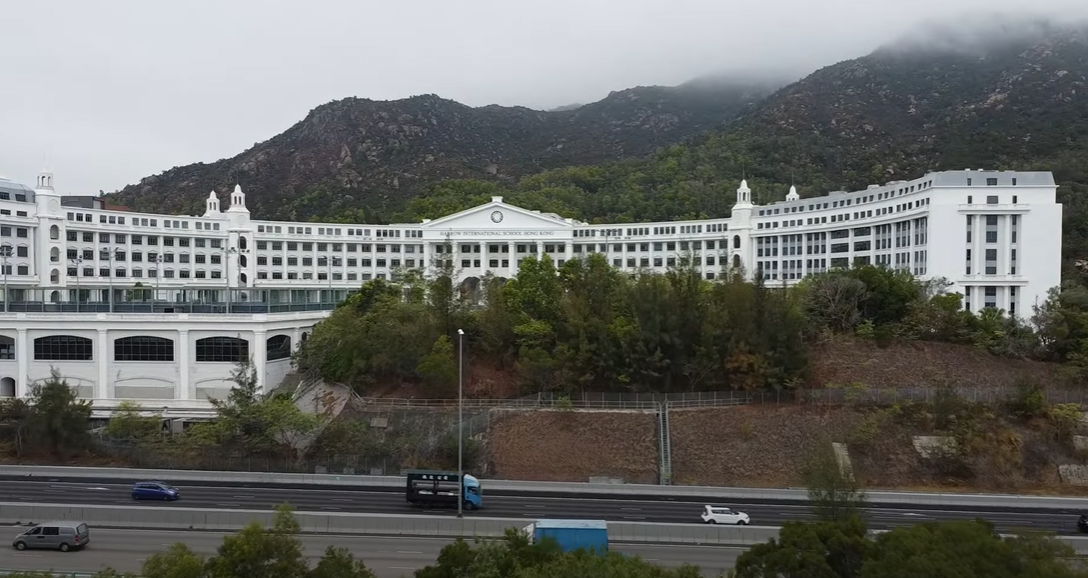
Harrow International School Hong Kong

There are also many overseas British independent schools in Hong Kong, such as Harrow International School Hong Kong, where 94% of students received grades (A*-B), Wycombe Abbey School Hong Kong, Malvern College Hong Kong, and Shrewsbury International School Hong Kong.

Moreover, many schools cover various regions of the world, such as Australian International School, American International School, Canadian International School, French International School, and Korean International School, among others.

Local schools in Hong Kong are categorized into three "bands" based on academic performance, with Band 1 schools being the most prestigious and competitive. These institutions are often criticized for being high-pressure environments. Band 1 schools include Diocesan Boys' School, Diocesan Girls' School, Ying Wa College, St. Paul's College and La Salle College.

=== Medium of instruction ===
At primary and secondary school levels, the government maintains a policy of "mother tongue instruction"; most schools use Cantonese as the medium of instruction, with written education in both Chinese and English. Other languages used as the medium of instruction in non-international school education include English and Putonghua (Mandarin Chinese). Secondary schools emphasise "bi-literacy and tri-lingualism", which has encouraged the proliferation of spoken Mandarin language education.

English is the official medium of instruction and assessment for most university programmes in Hong Kong, although Cantonese is predominant in informal discussions among local students and professors.

=== Tertiary education ===
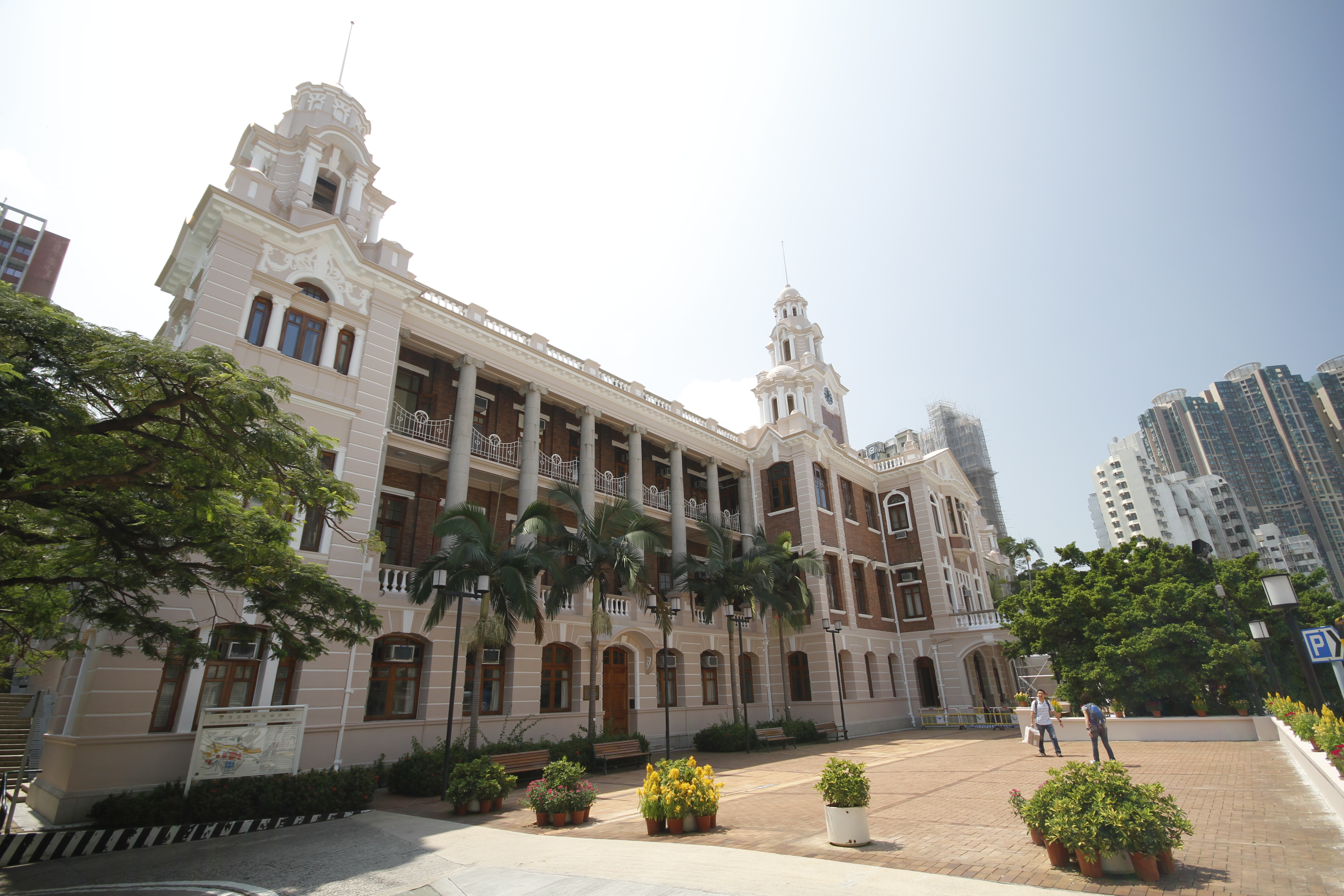
University of Hong Kong main building

Hong Kong has twelve universities. The University of Hong Kong (HKU), ranked QS Asia #1, was founded as the city's first institute of higher education in 1911 during the early colonial period. The Chinese University of Hong Kong (CUHK) was established in 1963 to fill the need for a university that taught using Chinese as its primary language of instruction. Along with the Hong Kong University of Science and Technology (HKUST) established in 1991, these universities are consistently ranked among the top 20 or top 50 universities worldwide.

The Hong Kong Polytechnic University (PolyU) and City University of Hong Kong (CityU), both granted university status in 1994, are consistently ranked among the top 50 or top 100 universities worldwide. The Hong Kong Baptist University (HKBU) was granted university status in 1994 and is a liberal arts institution. Hong Kong Metropolitan University (formerly the Open University of Hong Kong before 2021) (attaining status in 1997), Lingnan University (in 1999), Hong Kong Shue Yan University (in 2006), Education University of Hong Kong (in 2016), Hang Seng University of Hong Kong (in 2018) and Saint Francis University (in 2024) all attained full university status in subsequent years.

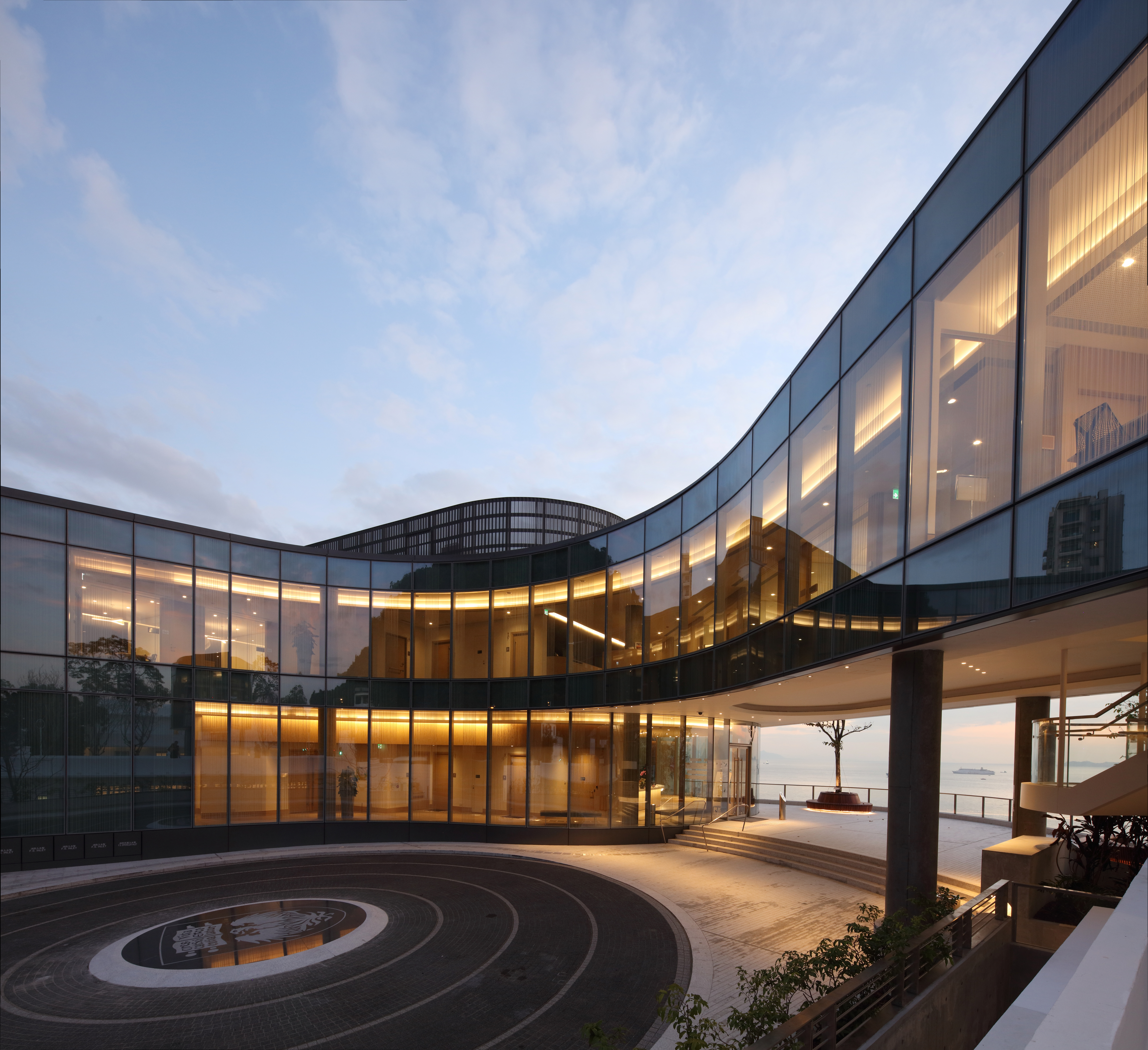
University of Chicago Hong Kong

Overseas universities in Hong Kong often operate as branch campuses or partnerships offering accredited degrees, such as the University of Chicago Hong Kong, University of Sunderland, and University of Wollongong in Hong Kong. These institutions provide local and internationally recognized qualifications.

In 2026, QS Best Student Cities ranked Hong Kong as the 17th best city for university students. 7th in Asia for best student cities. Noting high scores in employer activity, desirability, and diverse student population.

Subject Rankings

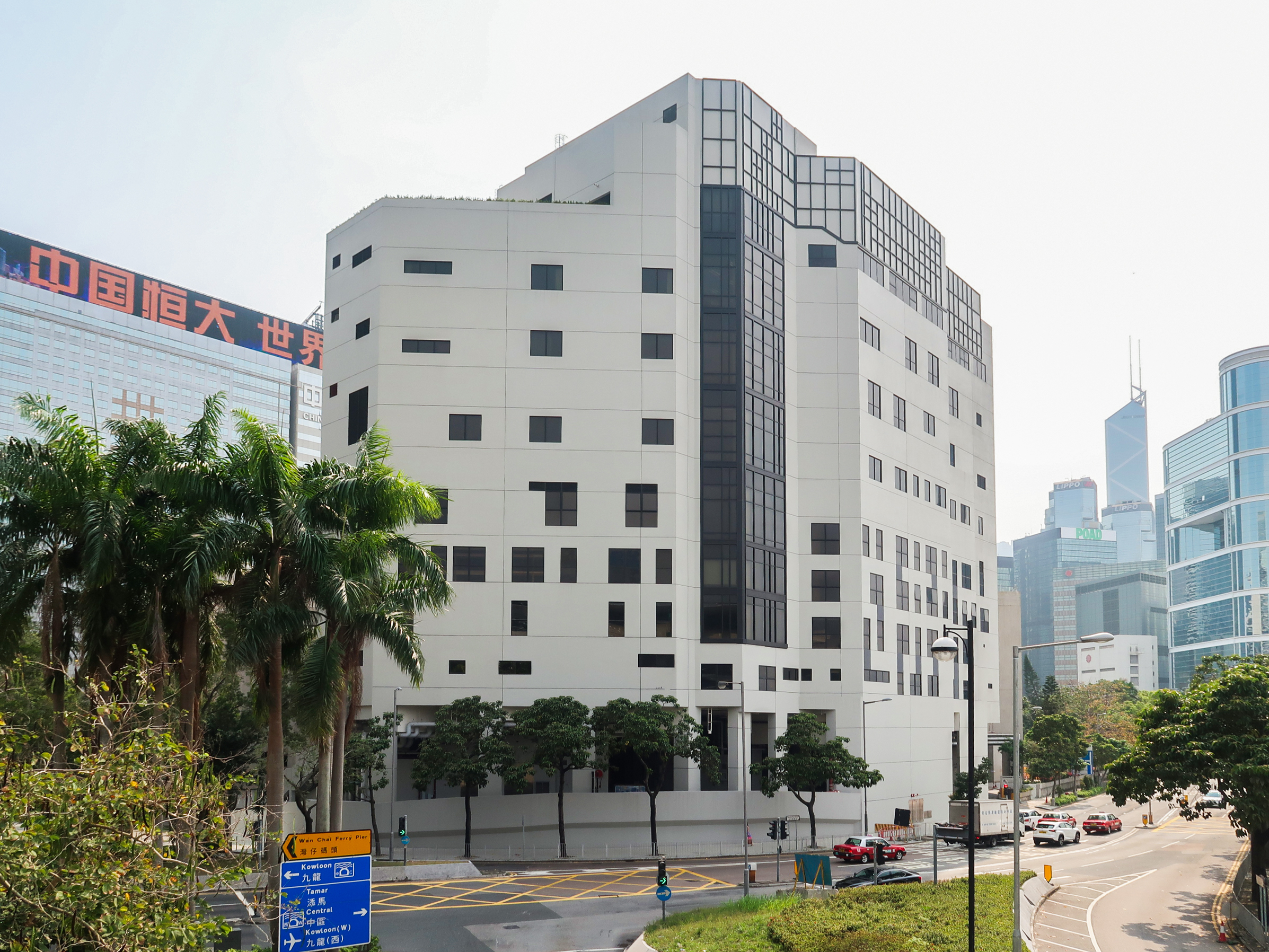
Hong Kong Academy for Performing Arts

In the 2026 QS World University Rankings by Subject, Hong Kong's higher education sector demonstrated significant global competitiveness, with five academic programs placing within the world's top 10. The University of Hong Kong (HKU) maintained its status as the city's most decorated institution, securing global 2nd and 5th positions for Dentistry and Education, respectively. Other top-tier performances included the Chinese University of Hong Kong (CUHK) ranking 6th globally for Nursing, the Education University of Hong Kong (EdUHK) placing 7th in Education, and the Hong Kong Academy for Performing Arts (HKAPA) breaking into the top 10 for Performing Arts—the highest-ranked performing arts institution in Asia.

== Healthcare ==
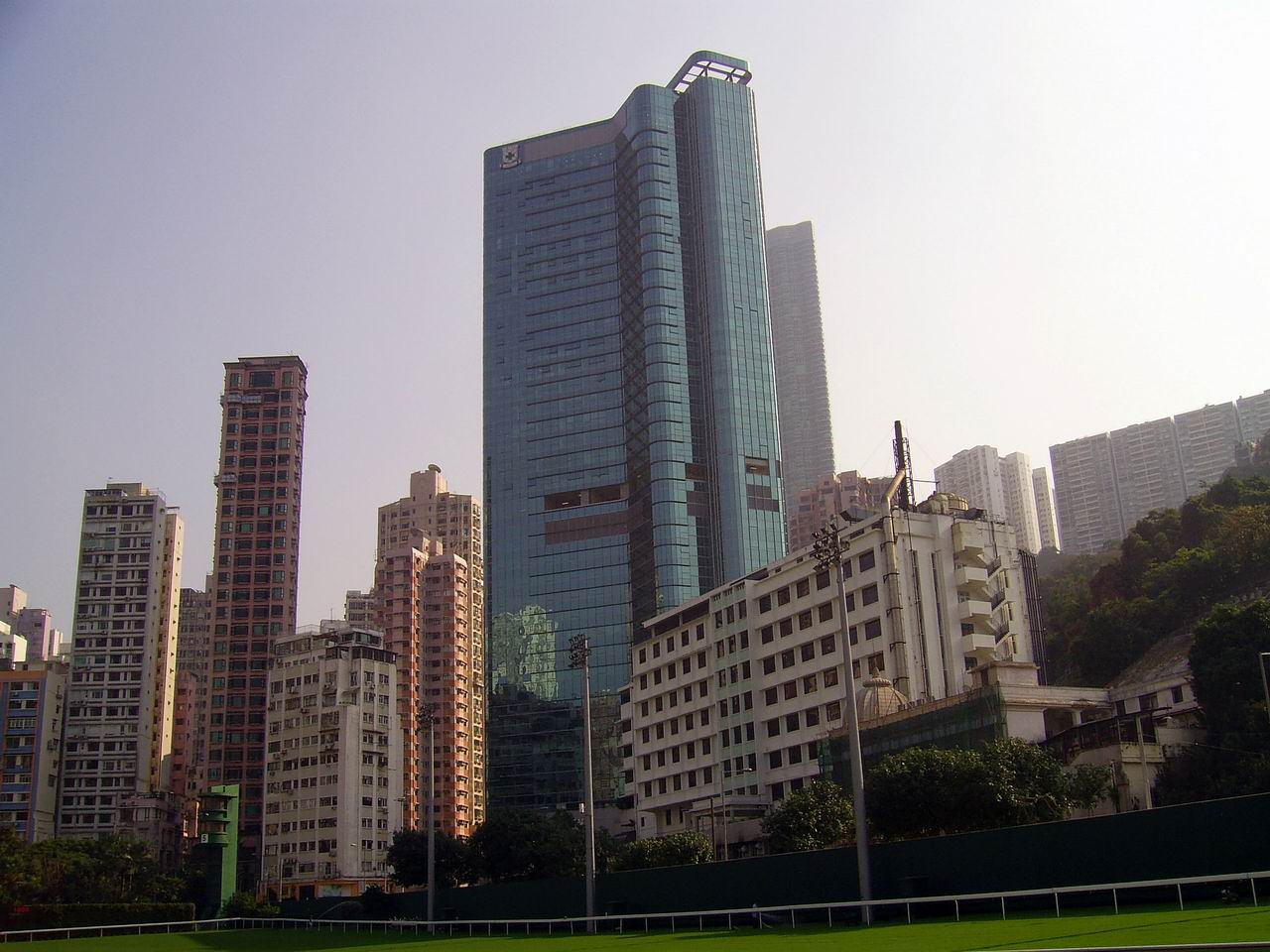
Hong Kong Sanatorium and Hospital (7th Tallest Hospital in the world)

Hong Kong is one of the healthiest places in the world, due to early health education, professional health services, and a well-developed healthcare and medication system.

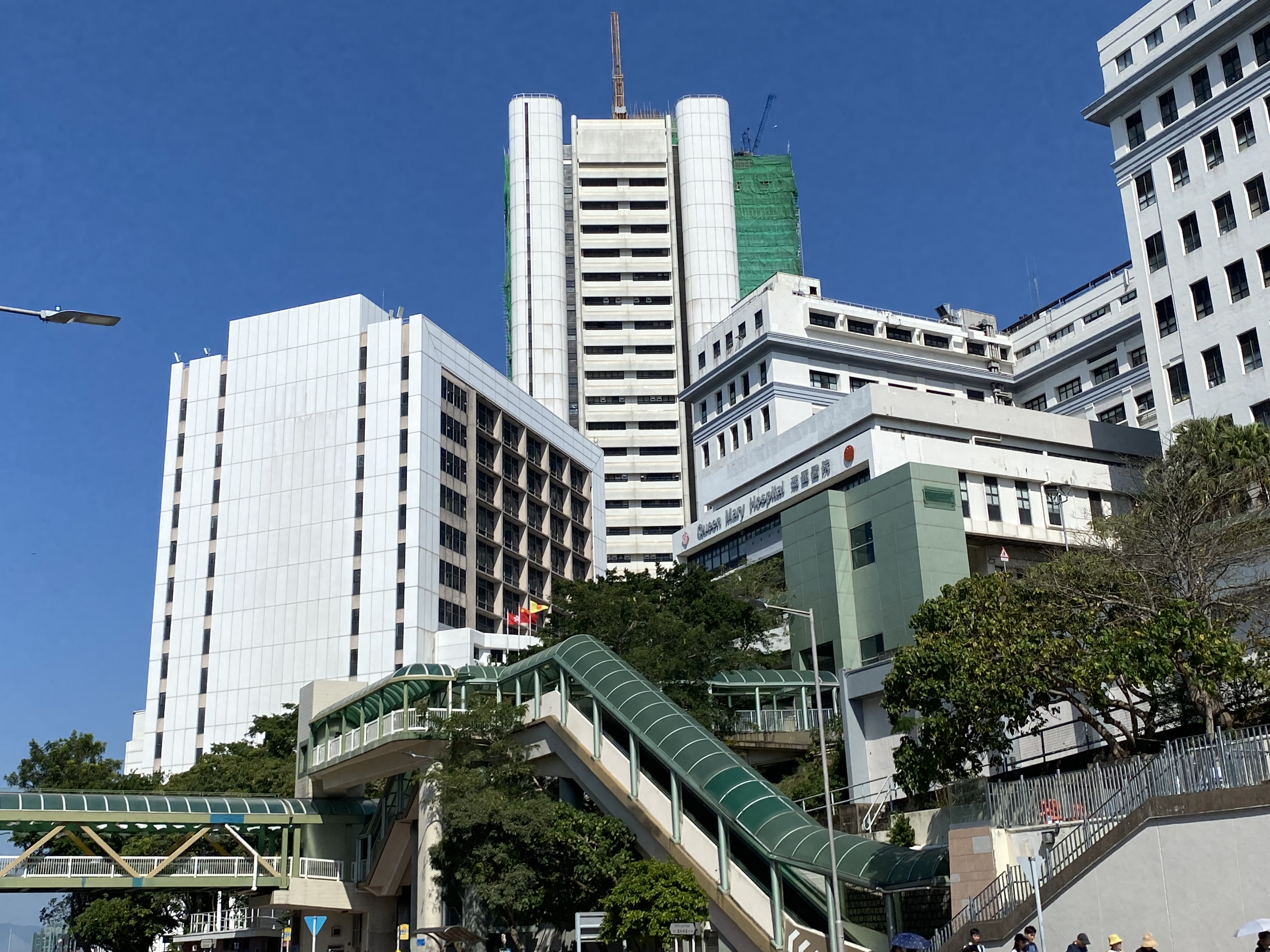
Queen Mary Hospital

Public healthcare in Hong Kong is recognized for its high-quality medical outcomes. The territory has the highest life expectancy in the world at 85.9 years. Hong Kong has one of the lowest infant mortality rates in the world, with recent estimates placing it around 1.7 to 2.5 deaths per 1,000 live births. However, the public system also faces challenges, including high patient volumes, overcrowding in emergency departments, and long wait times for specialist appointments and elective procedures.

Healthcare in Hong Kong is provided through two categories, consisting of public and private hospitals. While private hospital services cater to patients seeking shorter wait times and personalized care, the majority of the population relies on the extensive public healthcare system. Public hospitals and clinics are heavily subsidized by the government, ensuring affordable access to a wide range of medical services.

Hong Kong's healthcare system is managed primarily by the Hospital Authority, which was established in 1990 to oversee and operate all public hospitals in the region. The system is organized into seven geographic clusters that group hospitals and associated healthcare facilities based on their distribution across the territory. As of 2026, Hong Kong has a total of 42 public hospitals and 11 private hospitals.

The University of Hong Kong (HKU) Li Ka Shing Faculty of Medicine is consistently ranked among the top medical schools globally and is a leader in Asia, ranking 18th worldwide in the Times Higher Education 2026 Rankings for Clinical and Health and 24th in the QS World University Rankings Medicine.

== Media ==
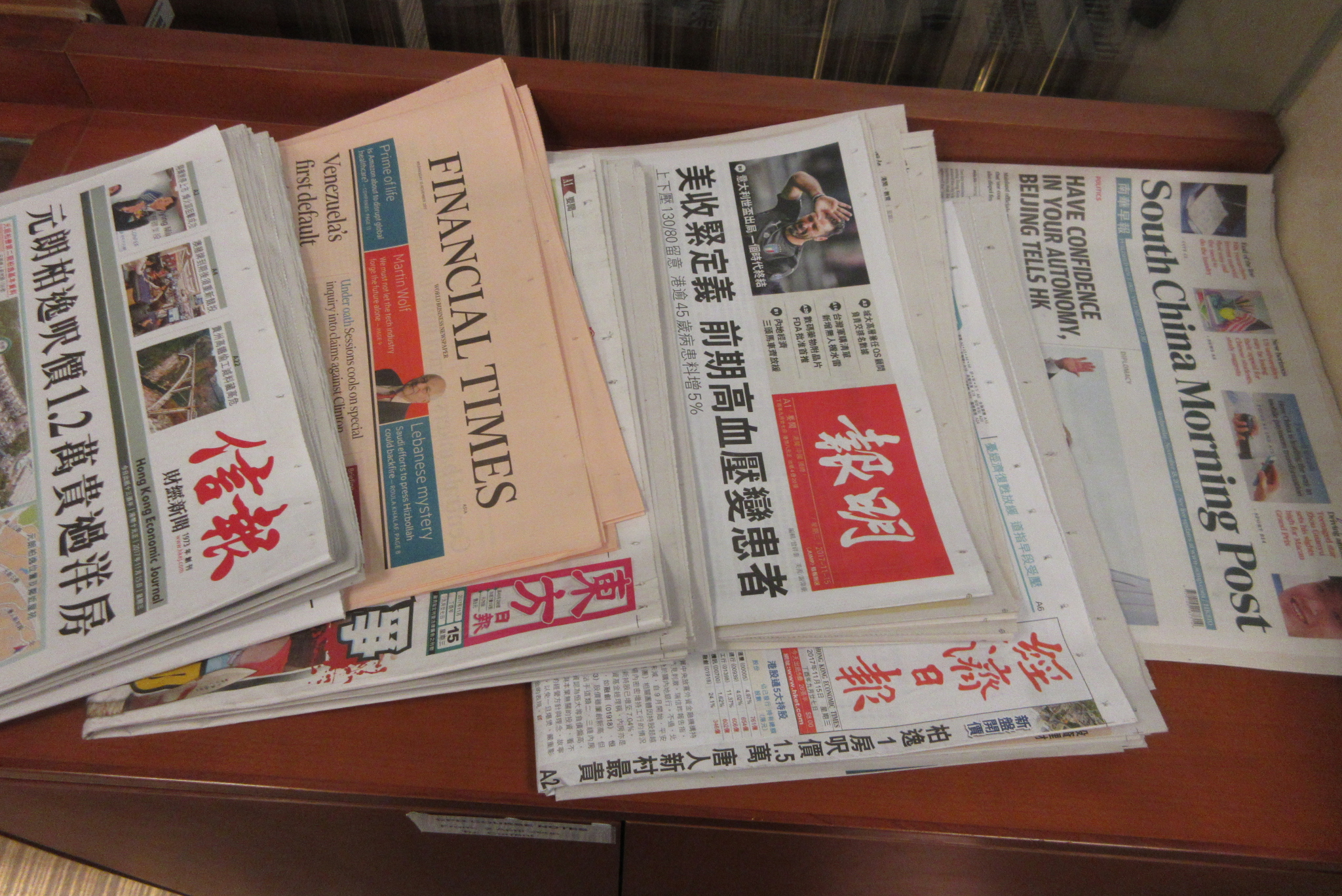
Hong Kong Newspapers

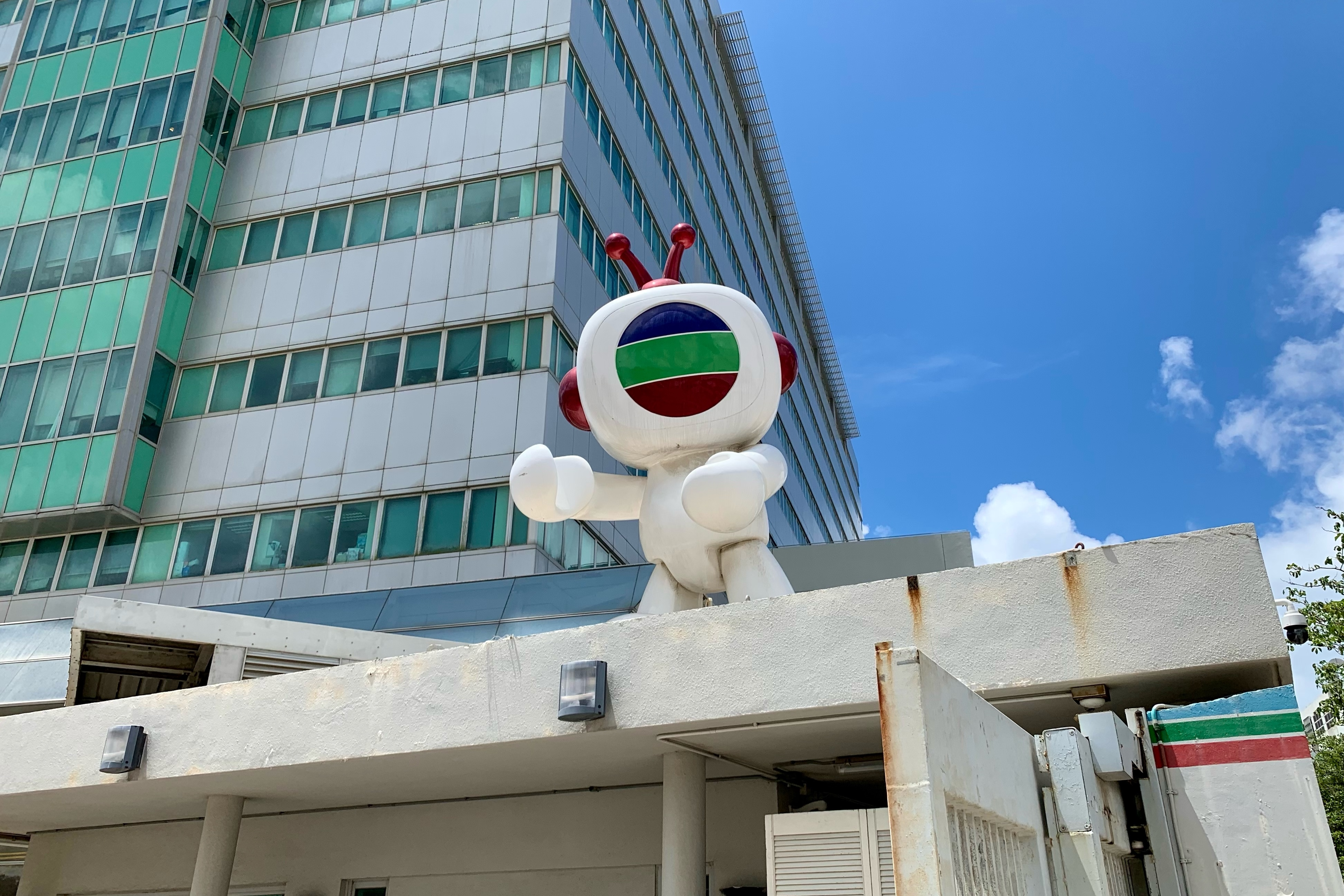
TVB City, headquarters of Hong Kong's first over-the-air television station

Most newspapers in Hong Kong are written in Chinese. There are also English-language newspapers, the major one being the South China Morning Post, with The Standard serving as a business-oriented alternative. A variety of Chinese-language newspapers are published daily; the most prominent are Ming Pao and Oriental Daily News. Local publications are often partisan, with pro-Beijing or pro-democracy sympathies. The central government has a print-media presence in the territory through the state-owned Ta Kung Pao and Wen Wei Po. Several international publications have regional operations in Hong Kong, including The Wall Street Journal, the Financial Times, USA Today, TimeOut, The Nikkei and Vogue Hong Kong.

Four free-to-air television broadcasters operate in the territory; TVB, HKTVE, HOY and Phoenix Television air eight digital channels. TVB, Hong Kong's dominant television network, has an 80% viewer share. Paid television services operated by PCCW offer hundreds of additional channels and cater to a variety of audiences. RTHK is the public broadcaster, providing seven radio channels and six free-to-air television channels. Ten non-domestic broadcasters air programming for the territory's foreign population. Access to media and information over the Internet is not subject to mainland Chinese regulations, including the Great Firewall, but local internet censorship applies.

== In popular culture ==
Hong Kong is mentioned in various popular culture movies, series, and books.

== See also ==
- Index of articles related to Hong Kong
- Macau – Special administrative region of China
- Outline of Hong Kong

== Sources ==
=== Print ===
- Ban, Biao 班彪; Ban, Gu 班固; Ban, Zhao 班昭 (111). 地理志 [Treatise on geography]. Book of Han (in Chinese). Vol. 28. OCLC 4342548.
- Barber, Nicola (2004). Hong Kong. Gareth Stevens. ISBN 978-0-8368-5198-4.
- Bishop, Kevin; Roberts, Annabel (1997). China's Imperial Way. Odyssey Publications. ISBN 978-962-217-511-2.
- Buckley, Roger (1997). Hong Kong: The Road to 1997. Cambridge University Press. ISBN 978-0-521-46979-1.
- Carroll, John (2007). A Concise History of Hong Kong. Rowman & Littlefield. ISBN 978-0-7425-3422-3.
- Chan, Cecilia; Chow, Amy (2006). Death, Dying and Bereavement: a Hong Kong Chinese Experience. Hong Kong University Press. ISBN 978-962-209-787-2.
- Chan, Shun-hing; Leung, Beatrice (2003). Changing Church and State Relations in Hong Kong, 1950–2000. Hong Kong University Press. ISBN 962-209-612-3.
- Chu, Cindy Yik-yi (2005). Foreign Communities in Hong Kong, 1840s–1950s. Palgrave Macmillan. ISBN 978-1-4039-8055-7.
- Chu, Yiu-wai (2017). Hong Kong Cantopop: A Concise History. Hong Kong University Press. ISBN 978-988-8390-58-8.
- Courtauld, Caroline; Holdsworth, May; Vickers, Simon (1997). The Hong Kong Story. Oxford University Press. ISBN 978-0-19-590353-9.
- Curry, Janel; Hanstedt, Paul (2014). Reading Hong Kong, Reading Ourselves. City University of Hong Kong Press. ISBN 978-962-937-235-4.
- Cushman, Jennifer Wayne (1993). Fields from the Sea: Chinese Junk Trade with Siam During the Late Eighteenth and Early Nineteenth Centuries. Cornell Southeast Asia Program. ISBN 978-0-87727-711-8.
- Davis, Sir John Francis (1841). Sketches of China: partly during an inland journey of four months, between Peking, Nanking, and Canton; with notices and observations relative to the present war. Vol. 1. Charles Knight & Co. OCLC 491627420.
- Dodsworth, John; Mihaljek, Dubravko (1997). Hong Kong, China: Growth, Structural Change, and Economic Stability During the Transition. International Monetary Fund. ISBN 978-1-55775-672-5.
- Edmonds, Richard L. (2002). China and Europe Since 1978: A European Perspective. Cambridge University Press. ISBN 978-0-521-52403-2.
- Empson, Hal (1992). Mapping Hong Kong: A Historical Atlas. Government Information Services. OCLC 29939947.
- Erni, John Nguyet; Leung, Lisa Yuk-ming (2014). Understanding South Asian Minorities in Hong Kong. Hong Kong University Press. ISBN 978-988-8208-34-0.
- Fowler, Jeaneane D.; Fowler, Merv (2008). Chinese Religions: Beliefs and Practices. Sussex Academic Press. ISBN 978-1-84519-172-6.
- Gittings, Danny (2009). "Hong Kong Judiciary". In Gaylord, Mark S.; Gittings, Danny; Traver, Harold (eds.). Introduction to Crime, Law and Justice in Hong Kong. Hong Kong University Press. pp. 147–168. ISBN 978-962-209-978-4.
- Ho, Wai-chung (2011). School Music Education and Social Change in mainland China, Hong Kong and Taiwan. Brill Publishers. ISBN 978-90-04-18917-1.
- Hoe, Susanna; Roebuck, Derek (1999). The Taking of Hong Kong: Charles and Clara Elliot in China Waters. Routledge. ISBN 978-0-7007-1145-1.
- Horne, John; Manzenreiter, Wolfram (2002). Japan, Korea and the 2002 World Cup. Routledge. ISBN 978-0-415-27563-7.
- Hu, Qi-ming (2003). "Preface". Rare and Precious Plants of Hong Kong. Agriculture, Fisheries and Conservation Department. ISBN 978-988-201-616-3. OCLC 491712858. Archived from the original on 22 May 2020.
- Ingham, Michael (2007). Hong Kong: A Cultural History. Oxford University Press. ISBN 978-0-19-531496-0.
- Keat, Ooi Gin (2004). Southeast Asia: A Historical Encyclopedia. ABC-CLIO. ISBN 978-1-57607-770-2.
- Lam, S.F.; Chang, Julian W. (2005). The Quest for Gold: Fifty Years of Amateur Sports in Hong Kong, 1947–1997. Hong Kong University Press. ISBN 978-962-209-765-0.
- Lam, Wai-man (2015). Understanding the Political Culture of Hong Kong: The Paradox of Activism and Depoliticization: The Paradox of Activism and Depoliticization. Routledge. ISBN 978-1-317-45301-7.
- Lee, S.H. (2006). SARS in China and Hong Kong. Nova Science Publishers. ISBN 978-1-59454-678-5.
- Leung, Julian Y.M. (2016). "Education in Hong Kong and China: Towards Convergence?". In Chan, Ming K.; Postiglione, Gerard A. (eds.). The Hong Kong Reader: Passage to Chinese Sovereignty: Passage to Chinese Sovereignty. Routledge. ISBN 978-1-315-48835-6.
- Li, Guo (2012). "A Site Catchment Analysis of Hong Kong's Neolithic Subsistence". In Cheng, Pei-kai; Fan, Ka Wai (eds.). New Perspectives on the Research of Chinese Culture. Springer. pp. 17–43. doi:10.1007/978-981-4021-78-4_2. ISBN 978-981-4021-77-7.
- Littlewood, Michael (2010). Taxation Without Representation: The History of Hong Kong's Troublingly Successful Tax System. Hong Kong University Press. ISBN 978-962-209-099-6.
- Long, Lucy M. (2015). Ethnic American Food Today: A Cultural Encyclopedia. Rowman & Littlefield. ISBN 978-1-4422-2730-9.
- Morton, Brian; Harper, Elizabeth (1995). An Introduction to the Cape d'Aguilar Marine Reserve, Hong Kong. Hong Kong University Press. ISBN 978-962-209-388-1.
- Owen, Bernie; Shaw, Raynor (2007). Hong Kong Landscapes: Shaping the Barren Rock. Hong Kong University Press. ISBN 978-962-209-847-3.
- Porter, Jonathan (1996). Macau, the Imaginary City: Culture and Society, 1557 to the Present. Westview Press. ISBN 978-0-8133-2836-2.
- Preston, Peter Wallace; Haacke, Jürgen (2003). Contemporary China: The Dynamics of Change at the Start of the New Millennium. RoutledgeCurzon. ISBN 978-0-7007-1637-1.
- Ren, Hai (4 October 2010). Neoliberalism and Culture in China and Hong Kong: The Countdown of Time. Oxford: Routledge. ISBN 978-1-136-92364-7.
- Schottenhammer, Angela (2007). The East Asian Maritime World 1400–1800: Its Fabrics of Power and Dynamics of Exchanges. Harrassowitz Verlag. ISBN 978-3-447-05474-4.
- Room, Adrian (2005). Placenames of the World. McFarland & Company. ISBN 978-0-7864-2248-7.
- Scott, Ian (1989). Political Change and the Crisis of Legitimacy in Hong Kong. University of Hawaiʻi Press. ISBN 978-0-8248-1269-0.
- Shen, Jianfa; Kee, Gordon (2017). Development and Planning in Seven Major Coastal Cities in Southern and Eastern China. Springer. doi:10.1007/978-3-319-46421-3. ISBN 978-3-319-46420-6.
- Smith, Gareth Dylan; Moir, Zack; Brennan, Matt; Rambarran, Shara; Kirkman, Phil (2017). The Routledge Research Companion to Popular Music Education. Routledge. ISBN 978-1-4724-6498-9.
- Snow, Philip (2003). The Fall of Hong Kong: Britain, China and the Japanese Occupation. Yale University Press. ISBN 978-0-300-10373-1.
- Tam, Maria Wai-chu; Chan, Eugene Kin-keung; Choi Kwan, Janice Wing-kum; Leung, Gloria Chi-kin; Lo, Alexandra Dak-wai; Tang, Simon Shu-pui (2012). "Basic Law – the Source of Hong Kong's Progress and Development" ( (PDF)). The Basic Law and Hong Kong – The 15th Anniversary of Reunification with the Motherland. Working Group on Overseas Community of the Basic Law Promotion Steering Committee. OCLC 884571397. Archived from the original on 12 June 2018.
- Tsang, Steve (2007). A Modern History of Hong Kong. I.B. Tauris. ISBN 978-1-84511-419-0.
- von Glahn, Richard (1996). Fountain of Fortune: Money and Monetary Policy in China, 1000–1700. University of California Press. ISBN 978-0-520-91745-3.
- Wasserstrom, Jeffrey. Vigil: Hong Kong on the Brink (2020) Online review
- Wills, John E. (1998). "Relations with Maritime Europe, 1514–1662". In Twitchett, Denis; Mote, Frederick W. (eds.). The Cambridge History of China: Volume 8, The Ming Dynasty, 1368–1644. Vol. 2. Cambridge University Press. pp. 333–375. doi:10.1017/CHOL9780521243339.009. ISBN 978-0-521-24333-9.
- Wiltshire, Trea (1997). Old Hong Kong Volume II: 1901–1945 (5th ed.). FormAsia Books. ISBN 978-962-7283-13-3.
- Wong, Siu Lun (1992). Emigration and stability in Hong Kong (PDF). University of Hong Kong. ISBN 978-962-7558-09-5.
- Wordie, Jason (2007). Streets: Exploring Kowloon. Hong Kong University Press. ISBN 978-962-209-813-8.
- Magalhães, Bianca dos Santos (2017). UNWTO Tourism Highlights: 2017 Edition. World Tourism Organization. doi:10.18111/9789284419029. ISBN 978-92-844-1901-2.
- Xi, Xu; Ingham, Mike (2003). City Voices: Hong Kong writing in English, 1945–present. Hong Kong University Press. ISBN 978-962-209-605-9.
- Xue, Charlie Q.L. (2016). Hong Kong Architecture 1945–2015: From Colonial to Global. Springer. doi:10.1007/978-981-10-1004-0. ISBN 978-981-10-1003-3.
- Yanne, Andrew; Heller, Gillis (2009). Signs of a Colonial Era. Hong Kong University Press. ISBN 978-962-209-944-9.
- Yeung, Rikkie (2008). Moving Millions: The Commercial Success and Political Controversies of Hong Kong's Railways. Hong Kong University Press. ISBN 978-962-209-963-0.
- Young, Simon N.M.; Cullen, Richard (2010). Electing Hong Kong's Chief Executive. Hong Kong University Press. ISBN 978-988-8028-39-9.
- Zhihong, Shi (2006). "China's Overseas Trade Policy and Its Historical Results: 1522–1840". In Latham, A.J.H.; Kawakatsu, Heita (eds.). Intra-Asian Trade and the World Market. Routledge. pp. 4–23. ISBN 978-0-415-37207-7.

==== Legislation and case law ====
- Amendment to the Basic Law Annex I (Instrument A111)
- Basic Law Chapter II
- Basic Law Chapter III
- Basic Law Chapter IV
- Basic Law Chapter V
- Basic Law Chapter VII
- Chief Executive of the Hong Kong Special Administrative Region and Another v the President of the Legislative Council HCAL 185/2016 at para. 20
- Constitution of the People's Republic of China (Instrument A1)
- District Councils Ordinance (Cap. 547) Schedule 3
- Emergency Regulations Ordinance (Cap. 241)
- Hong Kong Baptist University Ordinance (Cap. 1126)
- Hong Kong Special Administrative Region Passports Ordinance (Cap. 539)
- Lingnan University Ordinance (Cap. 1165)
- Ng Ka Ling and Another v the Director of Immigration FACV 14/1998 at para. 63
- Official Languages Ordinance (Cap. 5) § 3(1)
- Sino-British Joint Declaration (Instrument A301)
- Standing Committee Interpretation Concerning Implementation of Chinese Nationality Law in Hong Kong (Instrument A204)
- The Education University of Hong Kong Ordinance (Cap. 444)
- The Hong Kong Polytechnic University Ordinance (Cap. 1075)
- The Open University of Hong Kong Ordinance (Cap. 1145)

==== Academic publications ====
- Chen, Li (2011). "Universalism and Equal Sovereignty as Contested Myths of International Law in the Sino-Western Encounter". Journal of the History of International Law. 13 (1): 75–116. doi:10.1163/157180511X552054. SSRN 1672526.
- Cheng, Edmund W. (June 2016). "Street Politics in a Hybrid Regime: The Diffusion of Political Activism in Post-colonial Hong Kong". The China Quarterly. 226: 383–406. doi:10.1017/S0305741016000394.
- Cheng, Sheung-Tak; Lum, Terry; Lam, Linda C. W.; Fung, Helene H. (2013). "Hong Kong: Embracing a Fast Aging Society With Limited Welfare". The Gerontologist. 53 (4): 527–533. doi:10.1093/geront/gnt017. PMID 23528290.
- Cullinane, S. (2002). "The relationship between car ownership and public transport provision: a case study of Hong Kong". Transport Policy. 9 (1): 29–39. doi:10.1016/S0967-070X(01)00028-2.
- Fan, Shuh Ching (1974). "The Population of Hong Kong" (PDF). World Population Year: 1–2. OCLC 438716102. Archived from the original (PDF) on 18 July 2011.
- Forrest, Ray; La Grange, Adrienne; Yip, Ngai-ming (2004). "Hong Kong as a Global City? Social Distance and Spatial Differentiation". Urban Studies. 41 (1): 207–227. Bibcode:2004UrbSt..41..207F. doi:10.1080/0042098032000155759. S2CID 154042413.
- Fu, Poshek (2008). "Japanese Occupation, Shanghai Exiles, and Postwar Hong Kong Cinema". The China Quarterly. 194 (194): 380–394. doi:10.1017/S030574100800043X. JSTOR 20192203. S2CID 154730809.
- Fulton Commission (1963). "Report of the Fulton Commission, 1963: Commission to Advise on the Creation of a Federal-Type Chinese University in Hong Kong". Minerva. 1 (4): 493–507. doi:10.1007/bf01107190. JSTOR 41821589. S2CID 189763965.
- Jordan, Ann D. (1997). "Lost in the Translation: Two Legal Cultures, the Common Law Judiciary and the Basic Law of the Hong Kong Special Administrative Region". Cornell International Law Journal. 30 (2): 335–380.
- Lee, John (2012). "A Corpus-Based Analysis of Mixed Code in Hong Kong Speech". 2012 International Conference on Asian Language Processing. pp. 165–168. doi:10.1109/IALP.2012.10. ISBN 978-1-4673-6113-2. S2CID 16210378.
- Lee, Kwai Sang; Leung, Wai Mun (2012). "The status of Cantonese in the education policy of Hong Kong". Multilingual Education. 2 (2): 2. doi:10.1186/2191-5059-2-2. hdl:10397/98877.
- Lee, Nelson K. (2013). "The Changing Nature of Border, Scale and the Production of Hong Kong's Water Supply System since 1959". International Journal of Urban and Regional Research. 38 (3): 903–921. doi:10.1111/1468-2427.12060.
- McKercher, Bob; Ho, Pamela S.Y.; du Cros, Hilary (2004). "Attributes of Popular Attractions in Hong Kong". Annals of Tourism Research. 31 (2): 393–407. doi:10.1016/j.annals.2003.12.008. hdl:10397/29409.
- Meacham, William (1999). "Neolithic to Historic in the Hong Kong Region". Indo-Pacific Prehistory Association Bulletin. 18 (2): 121–128. doi:10.7152/bippa.v18i0.11707 (inactive 6 November 2026). eISSN 0156-1316. hdl:10722/208530.
- Ming, Sing (2006). "The Legitimacy Problem and Democratic Reform in Hong Kong". Journal of Contemporary China. 15 (48): 517–532. doi:10.1080/10670560600736558. S2CID 154949190.
- Poon, Simpson; Chau, Patrick (2001). "Octopus: The Growing E-payment System in Hong Kong" (PDF). Electronic Markets. 11 (2): 97–106. doi:10.1080/101967801300197016. S2CID 18766585. Archived from the original (PDF) on 27 June 2018.
- Sofield, Trevor H.B.; Sivan, Atara (2003). "From Cultural Festival to International Sport – The Hong Kong Dragon Boat Races". Journal of Sport & Tourism. 8 (1): 9–20. doi:10.1080/14775080306242. S2CID 144106613.
- Tong, C. O.; Wong, S. C. (1997). "The advantages of a high density, mixed land use, linear urban development". Transportation. 24 (3): 295–307. doi:10.1023/A:1004987422746. S2CID 152365622.
- Wong, Eliza L.Y.; Yeoh, Eng-kiong; Chau, Patsy Y.K.; Yam, Carrie H.K.; Cheung, Annie W.L.; Fung, Hong (2015). "How shall we examine and learn about public-private partnerships (PPPs) in the health sector? Realist evaluation of PPPs in Hong Kong". Social Science & Medicine. 147: 261–269. doi:10.1016/j.socscimed.2015.11.012. PMID 26605970.

=== Institutional reports ===
- A List of Licensed Broadcasting Services in Hong Kong (PDF) (Report). Office of the Communications Authority. 1 June 2018.
- Adaptation of Laws Programme – Guiding Principles and Guideline Glossary of Terms (PDF) (Report). Legislative Council. November 1998.
- Agriculture and Fisheries (PDF). Hong Kong: The Facts (Report). Hong Kong Government. May 2017.
- Airport Traffic Report (PDF) (Report). Port Authority of New York and New Jersey. 14 April 2017. Archived from the original (PDF) on 25 May 2017.
- Akamai's State of the Internet – Q1 2017 Report (PDF) (Report). Akamai Technologies. 2017.
- Annual Report 2016/17 (PDF) (Report). Airport Authority Hong Kong. 12 June 2017.
- Annual Report 2016–17 (PDF) (Report). Inland Revenue Department. 2017.
- Annual Report 2017 (PDF) (Report). Hongkong and Shanghai Hotels. 2017.
- Annual Report and Accounts 2011 (PDF) (Report). The Hongkong and Shanghai Banking Corporation. 2011.
- APAC Regional Headquarters (PDF) (Report). Cushman & Wakefield. April 2016. Archived from the original (PDF) on 12 June 2018.
- Béthanie – The Academy's Landmark Heritage Campus (PDF) (Report). Hong Kong Academy for Performing Arts. September 2015. Archived from the original (PDF) on 1 August 2020.
- Developing a Supplementary Guide to the Chinese Language Curriculum for Non-Chinese Speaking Students (PDF) (Report). Legislative Council. January 2008.
- District Administration (PDF). Hong Kong: The Facts (Report). Hong Kong Government. April 2016. Archived from the original (PDF) on 7 September 2008.
- Economic development: Statistical Highlights (PDF) (Report). Legislative Council. 26 April 2017.
- Family Survey 2013 (PDF) (Report). Legislative Council. July 2014.
- The UK's relations with Hong Kong: 30 years after the Joint Declaration (PDF) (Report). Parliament of the United Kingdom. 6 March 2015.
- Foreign and Commonwealth Office (October 2014). Written evidence from Foreign and Commonwealth Office (PDF) (Report). Parliament of the United Kingdom.
- Geography and Climate (PDF) (Report). Census and Statistics Department. 2010.
- Guidelines on the Legislative Council Election (PDF) (Report). Electoral Affairs Commission. 2016. Archived from the original (PDF) on 22 November 2018.
- Health Facts of Hong Kong: 2017 Edition (PDF) (Report). Department of Health. 2017.
- Hong Kong as a Service Economy (PDF). Hong Kong: The Facts (Report). Hong Kong Government. April 2016.
- Hong Kong Energy Statistics – 2016 Annual Report (PDF) (Report). Census and Statistics Department. April 2017.
- The Hong Kong Government Gazette (PDF) (Report). 3 September 1926 – via University of Hong Kong.
- Human Development Indices and Indicators – Statistical Update 2018 (PDF) (Report). United Nations Development Programme. 2018.
- Jiang, Guorong; Tang, Nancy; Law, Eve; Sze, Angela (September 2003). The Profitability of the Banking Sector in Hong Kong (PDF) (Report). Hong Kong Monetary Authority.
- June 2019 (PDF). Hong Kong Monthly Digest of Statistics (Report). Census and Statistics Department. June 2019.
- List of Political Affiliations of LegCo Members and DC Members (PDF) (Report). District Councils. 19 June 2017.
- Literacy Rates Continue to Rise from One Generation to the Next (PDF) (Report). UNESCO. September 2017. Archived from the original (PDF) on 29 March 2020.
- Lung, Charles C P; Sung, Y F (2010). A Century of Railway Development – The Hong Kong Story (PDF) (Report). Institution of Railway Signal Engineers. Archived from the original (PDF) on 11 April 2019.
- Main Results (PDF). 2021 Population By-Census (Report). Census and Statistics Department. 2021.
- Market Statistics 2018 (PDF) (Report). Hong Kong Stock Exchange. 2018.
- Panel on Education (8 January 2007). Grant to the Hong Kong Shue Yan University for Establishing a General Development Fund (PDF) (Report). Legislative Council.
- Panel on Home Affairs (June 2007). "List of Historical Buildings Declared as Monuments from 1997 to 2006" (PDF). The Queen's Pier (Report). Legislative Council.
- Public Finance (PDF). Hong Kong: The Facts (Report). Hong Kong Government. May 2018.
- Public Transport Strategy Study (PDF) (Report). Transport Department. June 2017.
- Radio Television Hong Kong (PDF). The 2018–2019 Budget (Report). Hong Kong Government. 2018.
- Railway Network (PDF). Hong Kong: The Facts (Report). Hong Kong Government. April 2018.
- Registration and Licensing of Vehicles by Class of Vehicles (PDF) (Report). Transport Department. January 2018.
- Religion and Custom (PDF). Hong Kong: The Facts (Report). Hong Kong Government. May 2016.
- Subcommittee on Matters Relating to Railways (2014). Follow-ups on the Service Suspension of Tseung Kwan O Line and Part of Kwun Tong Line on 16 December 2013, and Report on Subsequent Major Incidents on East Rail Line and Light Rail (PDF) (Report). Legislative Council.
- Reclamation Outside Victoria Harbour (PDF) (Report). Development Bureau. 2017.
- Report of the Task Force on Population Policy (PDF) (Report). Hong Kong Government. 2002.
- The Global Financial Centres Index 22 (PDF) (Report). China Development Institute. September 2017.
- The Media (PDF). Hong Kong: The Facts (Report). Hong Kong Government. December 2017.
- Thematic Report: Household Income Distribution in Hong Kong (PDF). 2021 Population By-Census (Report). Census and Statistics Department. May 2023.
- Tourism (PDF). Hong Kong: The Facts (Report). Hong Kong Government. May 2016.
- Transport (PDF). Hong Kong: The Facts (Report). Hong Kong Government. May 2016.
- Report on Study of Road Traffic Congestion in Hong Kong (PDF) (Report). Transport and Housing Bureau. December 2014. Archived from the original (PDF) on 23 April 2022.
- Transport and Housing Bureau (19 April 2017). Technical Legislative Amendments on Traffic Arrangements for the Hong Kong-Zhuhai-Macao Bridge (PDF) (Report). Legislative Council.
- Transport: Statistical Highlights (PDF) (Report). Legislative Council. 28 October 2016.
- Triennial Central Bank Survey: Foreign exchange turnover in April 2016 (PDF) (Report). Bank for International Settlements. September 2016.
- Usage of Information Technology and the Internet by Hong Kong Residents, 2000 to 2016 (PDF) (Report). Census and Statistics Department. November 2017.
- Use of Chinese in Court Proceedings (PDF) (Report). Legislative Council. 2011. Archived from the original (PDF) on 9 August 2020.
- Water Supplies (PDF). Hong Kong: The Facts (Report). Hong Kong Government. May 2016.
- Women and Men in Hong Kong Key Statistics (PDF) (Report). Census and Statistics Department. July 2017.
- Yu, Jian Zhen; Huang, Hilda; Ng, Wai Man (June 2013). Final Report for Provision of Service for Fine Particulate Matter (PM_{2.5}) Sample Chemical Analysis (PDF) (Report). Environmental Protection Department.

=== News and magazine articles ===
- Baldwin, Clare; Lee, Yimou; Jim, Clare (30 December 2014). "Special Report: The mainland's colonisation of the Hong Kong economy". Reuters.
- Bland, Ben (31 July 2016). "Hong Kong ban on pro-independence candidates sparks backlash". Financial Times. Archived from the original on 10 December 2022.
- Chan, Bernice (17 July 2017). "Hong Kong villagers using solar energy to help power their homes – and show its potential as a source of electricity for city". South China Morning Post.
- Chao, York (25 May 2013). "Racist Hong Kong is still a fact". South China Morning Post.
- Cheung, Stephanie (23 March 2015). "The case for extending Hong Kong's 2047 deadline". South China Morning Post.
- Cheung, Tony (10 May 2016). "Too soon to talk about 2047? Legal experts split on when Hong Kong should debate its future". South China Morning Post.
- Cheung, Tony (28 February 2017). "Who goes there? Hong Kong's participation in China's 'two sessions' explained". South China Morning Post.
- Cheung, Tony; Ho, Lauren (19 January 2013). "CY Leung insists housing policy won't cause property crash". South China Morning Post.
- Chow, Vivienne (16 March 2017). "Hong Kong's TVB Targeting New Revenues With OTT Platform, Productions". Variety.
- Darrach, Amanda (14 June 2019). "How many really marched in Hong Kong? And how should we best guess crowd size?". Columbia Journalism Review.
- "End of an experiment". The Economist. 15 July 2010.
- Frank, Robert (5 September 2018). "Hong Kong topples New York as world's richest city". CNBC.
- Gargan, Edward A. (1 July 1997). "China Resumes Control of Hong Kong, Concluding 156 Years of British Rule". The New York Times.
- Ge, Celine (28 July 2017). "It's fade out for Hong Kong's film industry as China moves into the spotlight". South China Morning Post.
- Gold, Anne (6 July 2001). "Hong Kong's Mile-Long Escalator System Elevates the Senses: A Stairway to Urban Heaven". The New York Times. Archived from the original on 22 March 2017.
- Griffiths, James; Lazarus, Sarah (22 October 2018). "World's longest sea-crossing bridge opens between Hong Kong and China". CNN.
- Haas, Benjamin (14 July 2017). "Hong Kong pro-democracy legislators disqualified from parliament". The Guardian.
- He, Huifeng (13 January 2013). "Forgotten stories of the great escape to Hong Kong". South China Morning Post.
- Hollingsworth, Julia; Zheng, Sarah (27 March 2017). "Top 10 Hong Kong skyscraper nicknames, from the Big Syringe to the Hong Kong Finger". South China Morning Post.
- Huang, Echo (15 November 2016). "A Hong Kong court has disqualified two legislators who refused to take their oath "correctly"". Quartz.
- Kaiman, Jonathan (30 September 2014). "Hong Kong's umbrella revolution – the Guardian briefing". The Guardian.
- Kong, Daniel (8 August 2013). "Hong Kong Imports Over 90% of Its Food. Can It Learn to Grow?". Modern Farmer. Archived from the original on 29 October 2013.
- Kwok, Donny (22 September 2018). "All aboard: Hong Kong bullet train signals high-speed integration with China". Reuters.
- Labarre, Suzanne (15 June 2010). "Ingenious Flipper Bridge Melds Left-Side Drivers With Right-Side Drivers". Fast Company.
- Lendon, Brad (29 June 2017). "China makes its military more visible in Hong Kong". CNN.
- Lhatoo, Yonden (17 September 2015). "Racism is rife in Hong Kong, and the Equal Opportunities Commission is a toothless hamster to tackle it". South China Morning Post.
- Liu, Alfred (5 September 2018). "These Are the Cities With the Most Ultra-Rich People". Bloomberg News.
- Mok, Danny (14 February 2018). "Going up! Prices for Hong Kong's famous Peak Tram to increase for second time in less than two years". South China Morning Post.
- Mok, Danny; Lee, Eddie (4 March 2015). "Let Hongkongers serve in China's People's Liberation Army, says top military official". South China Morning Post.
- Ngo, Jennifer; Cheung, Elizabeth (16 March 2016). "A case for inclusion: Carrie Lam pledges to tout list of 16 ethnic minority Hongkongers for government advisory positions". South China Morning Post.
- Park, Kyunghee (23 January 2019). "Once the World's Greatest Port, Hong Kong Sinks in Global Ranking". Bloomberg News.
- Sala, Ilaria Maria (1 September 2016). "As Hong Kong goes to the polls, why isn't the Communist Party on the ballot?". Quartz.
- Siu, Phila; Chung, Kimmy (27 December 2017). "Controversial joint checkpoint plan approved for high-speed rail link as Hong Kong officials dismiss concerns over legality". South China Morning Post.
- Tam, Luisa (11 September 2017). "Self-centred, demanding, materialistic and arrogant: how to steer clear of the Kong Girls". South China Morning Post. Hong Kong.
- Tatlow, Didi Kirsten (2 February 2017). "On Deck With China's Last Junk Builders, Masters of an Ebbing Craft". The New York Times. Archived from the original on 2 January 2022.
- "To restore calm in Hong Kong, try democracy". The Economist. 20 June 2019.
- Wong, Joshua; Lim, Emily (23 February 2017). "We must resist until China gives Hong Kong a say in our future". The Guardian.
- Hung, Emily; Ma, Jess (19 September 2023). "Hong Kong's poorest struggle to benefit from post-pandemic recovery with wealth gap at its worst in over 10 years, Oxfam warns". South China Morning Post.
- Yu, Verna (6 January 2013). "Veterans who fled mainland for Hong Kong in 1970s tell their stories". South China Morning Post.
- Zhao, Shirley (6 September 2015). "'If you tell them you are Pakistani, they won't give you the flat': Finding a Hong Kong home is battle against prejudice for ethnic minorities". South China Morning Post.
- Zheng, Sarah (14 January 2017). "Hong Kong's heritage sites face continued threat despite government grading system". South China Morning Post. Hong Kong.

=== Websites ===
- Bush, Richard C.; Whelan-Wuest, Maeve (29 March 2017). "Another Hong Kong election, another pro-Beijing leader—why it matters". Brookings Institution.
- Desjardins, Jeff (14 March 2018). "These 25 countries have the most billionaires". Business Insider.
- "Disclaimer and Copyright Notice". Legislative Council.
- Ghoshal, Amoy (1 July 2011). "Asian Cup: Know Your History – Part One (1956–1988)". Goal.
- "HK records hottest day before typhoon". EJ Insight. 23 August 2017. Archived from the original on 29 July 2018.
- "HK vs China GDP: A sobering reality". EJ Insight. 9 June 2017. Archived from the original on 29 August 2018.
- "Hong Kong Activists Stare Down 'Great Firewall of China'". NBC News. 29 September 2014.
- "Hong Kong profile – Media". BBC News. 5 March 2018.
- Kohlstedt, Kurt (5 September 2016). "Here Be Dragons: How Feng Shui Shapes the Skyline of Hong Kong". 99% Invisible.
- Kwong, Chi Man (9 September 2015). "Hong Kong during World War II: A Transnational Battlefield". University of Nottingham. Archived from the original on 27 June 2018.
- Lam, Eric; Qiu, Yue (23 June 2017). "Hong Kong's Stock Market Tells the Story of China's Growing Dominance". Bloomberg News.
- "Land Use in Hong Kong 2017". Planning Department. Archived from the original on 19 October 2013.
- "Meanings of Right of Abode and Other Terms". Immigration Department.
