= 2007 Wan Chai District Council election =

Local election in Hong Kong

- 18 November 2007

11 (of the 14) seats to Wan Chai District Council 8 seats needed for a majority
- Turnout: 30.7%
| | First party | Second party |
|---|---|---|
| Party | DAB | LSD |
| Last election | 1 seat, 33.8% | New party |
| Seats before | 1 | 0 |
| Seats won | 2 | 1 |
| Seat change | ▲1 | ▲1 |
| Popular vote | 3,501 | 604 |
| Percentage | 17.9% | 3.1% |
| Swing | ▼15.9% | N/A |
- Colours on map indicate winning party for each constituency.

The 2007 Wan Chai District Council election was held on 18 November 2007 to elect all 11 elected members to the 14-member District Council.

== Overall election results ==
Before election:

↓
| 7 | 4 |
| Pro-democracy | Pro-Beijing |

Change in composition:

↓
| 4 | 7 |
| Pro-democracy | Pro-Beijing |

Wan Chai District Council election result 2007
| Party | Seats | Gains | Losses | Net gain/loss | Seats % | Votes % | Votes | +/− |
|---|---|---|---|---|---|---|---|---|
| Independent | 8 | 4 | 3 | +1 | 62.6 | 58.0 | 11,332 | |
| DAB | 2 | 1 | 0 | +1 | 18.2 | 17.9 | 3,501 | −15.9 |
| Civic | 0 | 0 | 0 | 0 | 0 | 6.6 | 1,287 | |
| Civic Act-up | 0 | 0 | 2 | −2 | 0 | 5.1 | 991 | |
| Democratic | 0 | 0 | 1 | −1 | 0 | 4.8 | 947 | −7.6 |
| Liberal | 0 | 0 | 0 | 0 | 0 | 4.5 | 871 | |
| LSD | 1 | 1 | 1 | +1 | 9.1 | 3.1 | 604 | |

== Results by constituency ==
=== Broadwood ===
Broadwood
| Party | Candidate | Votes | % | ±% |
|---|---|---|---|---|
| LSD | Michael Mak Kwok-fung | 604 | 47.0 | |
| Independent | Wong Sui-wah | 442 | 34.4 | |
| Independent | Leung Chi-pui | 238 | 18.5 | |
| Majority | | 162 | 12.6 | |
| LSD gain from Civic Act-up | | Swing | | |

=== Canal Road ===
Canal Road
| Party | Candidate | Votes | % | ±% |
|---|---|---|---|---|
| Nonpartisan | Lee Kai-hung | 1,039 | 53.9 | |
| DAB | Jacqueline Chung Ka-man | 888 | 46.1 | |
| Majority | | 151 | 7.8 | |
| Nonpartisan hold | | Swing | N/A | |

=== Causeway Bay ===
Causeway Bay
| Party | Candidate | Votes | % | ±% |
|---|---|---|---|---|
| Independent | Yolanda Ng Yuen-ting | 834 | 54.1 | |
| Independent | John Tse Wing-ling | 709 | 45.9 | −9.1 |
| Independent gain from Independent | | Swing | | |

=== Happy Valley ===
Happy Valley
| Party | Candidate | Votes | % | ±% |
|---|---|---|---|---|
| Nonpartisan | Stephen Ng Kam-chun | 1,309 | 64.5 | +9.0 |
| Civic | Anthony Lam Yue-yeung | 620 | 35.5 | |
| Majority | | 689 | 29.0 | +18.0 |
| Nonpartisan hold | | Swing | N/A | |

=== Hennessy ===
Hennessy
| Party | Candidate | Votes | % | ±% |
|---|---|---|---|---|
| Nonpartisan | Cheng Ki-kin | 1,463 | 77.7 | +17.4 |
| Liberal | Eddie Suen Wai-hon | 264 | 14.0 | |
| Nonpartisan | Andrew Wong Fai-hung | 155 | 8.2 | |
| Independent hold | | Swing | | |

=== Jardine's Lookout ===
Jardine's Lookout
| Party | Candidate | Votes | % | ±% |
|---|---|---|---|---|
| Nonpartisan | David Lai | 755 | 55.4 | |
| Liberal | Alice Tso Shing-yuk | 607 | 44.6 | |
| Majority | | 148 | 10.8 | –22.4 |
| Nonpartisan gain from Civic Act-up | | Swing | | |

=== Oi Kwan ===
Oi Kwan
| Party | Candidate | Votes | % | ±% |
|---|---|---|---|---|
| DAB | Anna Tang King-yung | 1,391 | 75.4 | +21.4 |
| Nonpartisan | Leung Yuk-yin | 454 | 24.6 | |
| Majority | | 937 | 50.8 | +39.4 |
| DAB hold | | Swing | N/A | |

=== Southorn ===
Southorn
| Party | Candidate | Votes | % | ±% |
|---|---|---|---|---|
| Independent | Lee Pik-yee | 1,080 | 59.6 | |
| Civic Act-up | Kellogg Ngai | 577 | 31.8 | −28.9 |
| Independent | Wong Kwok-hong | 156 | 8.6 | |
| Independent gain from Civic Act-up | | Swing | | |

=== Stubbs Road ===
Stubbs Road
| Party | Candidate | Votes | % | ±% |
|---|---|---|---|---|
| Nonpartisan | Wong Wang-tai | 696 | 55.1 | –14.6 |
| Civic | Paulus Johannes Zimmerman | 567 | 44.9 | |
| Majority | | 544 | 1.3 | –38.0 |
| Nonpartisan hold | | Swing | N/A | |

=== Tai Fat Hau ===
Tai Fat Hau
| Party | Candidate | Votes | % | ±% |
|---|---|---|---|---|
| DAB | Kenny Lee Kwun-yee | 1,222 | 47.4 | +0.6 |
| Nonpartisan | Lo Kin-ming | 943 | 36.6 | –16.6 |
| Civic Act-up | Ivy Chan Siu-ping | 414 | 16.1 | |
| Majority | | 279 | 20.5 | +14.1 |
| DAB gain from Nonpartisan | | Swing | | |

=== Tai Hang ===
Tai Hang
| Party | Candidate | Votes | % | ±% |
|---|---|---|---|---|
| Independent | Wong Chor-fung | 1,059 | 52.8 | |
| Democratic | Bonson Lee Hing-wai | 947 | 47.2 | −16.7 |
| Independent gain from Democratic | | Swing | | |
