= 2003 Wan Chai District Council election =

Hong Kong local election

- 23 November 2003

11 (of the 14) seats to Wan Chai District Council 8 seats needed for a majority
- Turnout: 35.5%
	First party	Second party	Third party
Party	Civic Act-up	Democratic	DAB
Last election	New party	2 seats, 28.2%	3 seats, 33.4%
Seats before	0	2	3
Seats won	3	2	1
Seat change	▲3	Steady	▼2
Popular vote	5,170	2,656	6,679
Percentage	26.1%	13.4%	33.8%
Swing	Steady	▼14.8%	▲0.4%
- Colours on map indicate winning party for each constituency.

The 2003 Wan Chai District Council election was held on 23 November 2003 to elect all 11 elected members to the 14-member District Council.

== Overall election results ==
Before election:

↓
3	8
Pro-dem	Pro-Beijing

Change in composition:

↓
7	4
Pro-democracy	Pro-Beijing

Wan Chai District Council election result 2003
Party	Seats	Gains	Losses	Net gain/loss	Seats %	Votes %	Votes	+/−
DAB	1	0	2	–2	9.1	33.8	6,679	+0.4
Civic Act-up	3	3	0	+3	27.3	26.1	5,170	
Independent	4	1	3	−2	36.4	20.2	4,002	
Democratic	2	0	0	0	18.2	13.4	2,656	–14.8
Wan Chai Community Union	1	1	0	+1	9.1	6.0	1,189	
Rights Party	0	0	0	0	0	0.4	79	

== Results by constituency ==
=== Broadwood ===
Broadwood
Party	Candidate	Votes	%	±%
Independent	Ada Wong Ying-kay	uncontested		
Independent hold		Swing		

=== Canal Road ===
Canal Road
Party	Candidate	Votes	%	±%
Nonpartisan	Lee Kai-hung	1,117	54.0	
DAB	Suen Kai-cheong	952	46.0	
Majority		165	8.0	N/A
Nonpartisan gain from DAB		Swing	N/A	

=== Causeway Bay ===
Causeway Bay
Party	Candidate	Votes	%	±%
Democratic	John Tse Wing-ling	1,190	55.0	
DAB	Kenny Lee Kwun-yee	974	45.0	
Democratic hold		Swing		

=== Happy Valley ===
Happy Valley
Party	Candidate	Votes	%	±%
Nonpartisan	Stephen Ng Kam-chun	1,236	55.5	–27.1
Civic Act-up	Jo Lee Wai-yee	991	44.5	
Majority		245	11.0	–54.8
Nonpartisan hold		Swing	N/A	

=== Hennessy ===
Hennessy
Party	Candidate	Votes	%	±%
Civic Act-up	Cheng Ki-kin	1,064	60.4	
DAB	Lee Yuen-kwong	699	39.6	−
Civic Act-up gain from CRA		Swing		

=== Jardine's Lookout ===
Jardine's Lookout
Party	Candidate	Votes	%	±%
Civic Act-up	Steve Chan Yiu-fai	1,219	66.6	
Nonpartisan	Pong Ho-wing	611	33.4	
Majority		608	33.2	
Civic Act-up gain from Liberal		Swing	N/A	

=== Oi Kwan ===
Oi Kwan
Party	Candidate	Votes	%	±%
DAB	Anna Tang King-yung	1,248	54.0	
Civic Act-up	Ho Wing-yin	985	42.6	
Rights Party	Imran Rabbi	79	3.4	
Majority		263	11.4	N/A
DAB hold		Swing	N/A	

=== Southorn ===
Southorn
Party	Candidate	Votes	%	±%
Civic Act-up	King Mary Ann Pui Wai	911	60.7	
DAB	Lau Pui-shan	590	39.3	
Civic Act-up gain from Independent		Swing		

=== Stubbs Road ===
Stubbs Road
Party	Candidate	Votes	%	±%
Nonpartisan	Wong Wang-tai	776	69.66	
DAB	Cheung Kwok-kwan	338	30.34	
Majority		438	39.32	N/A
Nonpartisan gain from Nonpartisan		Swing	N/A	

=== Tai Fat Hau ===
Tai Fat Hau
Party	Candidate	Votes	%	±%
WCCU	Lo Kin-ming	1,189	53.2	
DAB	Lo Tin-sown	1,048	46.8	–22.9
Majority		141	6.4	N/A
Nonpartisan gain from DAB		Swing	N/A	

=== Tai Hang ===
Tai Hang
Party	Candidate	Votes	%	±%
Democratic	Bonson Lee Hing-wai	1,466	63.9	+12.1
DAB	Yuen Chun-chuen	830	36.1	−11.2
Democratic hold		Swing		
