= 1994 Wan Chai District Board election =

Hong Kong election

← 1991	18 September 1994	1999 →

All 10 seats to Wan Chai District Board 6 seats needed for a majority
- Turnout: 24.5%
	First party	Second party
Party	Democratic	DAB
Last election	2 seats, 22.3%	New party
Seats before	2	2
Seats won	3	3
Seat change	▲1	▲1
Popular vote	5,300	2,867
Percentage	34.4%	18.6%
Swing	▲12.1%	N/A
	Third party	Fourth party
Party	Liberal	LDF
Last election	New party	Did not run
Seats before	0	1
Seats won	1	1
Seat change	▲1	Steady
Popular vote	1,246	817
Percentage	8.1%	5.3%
Swing	N/A	N/A
- Colours on map indicate winning party for each constituency.

The 1994 Wan Chai District Board election was held on 18 September 1994 to elect all 10 elected members to the Wan Chai District Board.

== Overall election results ==
Before election:

↓
4	6
Pro-democracy	Pro-Beijing

Change in composition:

↓
3	7
Pro-democracy	Pro-Beijing

Wan Chai District Board election result 1994
Party	Seats	Gains	Losses	Net gain/loss	Seats %	Votes %	Votes	+/−
Democratic	3	1	0	+1	30.0	34.4	5,300	+12.1
Independent	1	0	1	–1	10.0	22.8	3,510	
DAB	3	1	0	+1	40.0	18.6	2,867	
Liberal	1	1	0	+1	10.0	8.1	1,246	
LDF	1	0	0	0	10.0	5.3	817	
HKDF	0	0	0	0	0	3.7	575	

== Results by constituency ==
=== Canal Road ===
Canal Road
Party	Candidate	Votes	%	±%
DAB	Suen Sai-cheong	809	53.2	
Democratic	Tang Ping	684	45.8	
Majority		125	7.4	
DAB win (new seat)				

=== Causeway Bay ===
Causeway Bay
Party	Candidate	Votes	%	±%
Democratic	John Tse Wing-ling	1,101	58.9	
Independent	Stephen Liu Wing-ting	102	5.3	
Democratic win (new seat)				

=== Happy Valley ===
Happy Valley
Party	Candidate	Votes	%	±%
LDF	Stephen Ng Kam-chun	817	45.8	–12.4
Nonpartisan	Yu Kwok-tung	776	43.5	
Liberal	Pong Ho-wing	166	9.3	
Majority		41	2.3	
LDF hold		Swing		

=== Hennessy ===
Hennessy
Party	Candidate	Votes	%	±%
Independent	San Stephen Wong Hon-ching	1,071	63.1	
Democratic	Cheng Chin-cheung	616	36.3	
Independent win (new seat)				

=== Jardine's Lookout ===
Jardine's Lookout
Party	Candidate	Votes	%	±%
Liberal	Alice Tso Shing-yuk	605	36.2	
HKDF	Kan Sheung-nim	575	34.4	
Nonpartisan	Thomas Chan Tin-chi	324	19.4	
Nonpartisan	James Cheng Chung-chin	139	8.3	
Majority		30	1.8	
Liberal win (new seat)				

=== Oi Kwan ===
Oi Kwan
Party	Candidate	Votes	%	±%
DAB	Anna Tang King-yung	uncontested		
DAB win (new seat)				

=== Southorn ===
Southorn
Party	Candidate	Votes	%	±%
Independent	Peggy Lam Pei	1,297	67.4	
Democratic	Chan Miu-tak	511	26.6	
Independent	Ho Ka-cheung	102	5.3	
Independent win (new seat)				

=== Stubbs Road ===
Stubbs Road
Party	Candidate	Votes	%	±%
Democratic	Mark Li Kin-yin	609	43.47	
Liberal	Mark Lin Man-kit	475	33.90	
DAB	Ho Yuk-wing	317	22.63	
Majority		134	9.56	N/A
Democratic win (new seat)				

=== Tai Fat Hau ===
Tai Fat Hau
Party	Candidate	Votes	%	±%
DAB	Lo Tin-sown	1,275	69.7	+15.8
Democratic	Terence So Kai-kuen	540	29.5	–10.0
Majority		735	40.2	+25.8
DAB hold		Swing	+12.9	

=== Tai Hang ===
Tai Hang
Party	Candidate	Votes	%	±%
Democratic	Bonson Lee Hing-wai	1,032	58.9	
DAB	Chan Tak-ming	720	41.1	
Majority		312	17.8	
Democratic win (new seat)				

== See also ==
- 1994 Hong Kong local elections
