= 1999 Wan Chai District Council election =

Hong Kong local election

- 28 November 1999

11 (of the 14) seats to Wan Chai District Council 8 seats needed for a majority
- Turnout: 27.0%
	First party	Second party	Third party
Party	DAB	Democratic	Liberal
Last election	3 seats, 18.6%	3 seats, 34.4%	1 seat, 8.1%
Seats before	3	3	1
Seats won	3	2	1
Seat change	Steady	▼1	▲1
Popular vote	2,706	2,803	1,855
Percentage	27.3%	28.2%	18.7%
Swing	▲8.7%	▼6.2%	▲10.6%
	Fourth party	Fifth party
Party	HKPA	CRA
Last election	Did not run	Did not run
Seats before	1	1
Seats won	1	1
Seat change	Steady	Steady
Popular vote	1,398	Uncontested
Percentage	14.1%	N/A
Swing	N/A	N/A
- Colours on map indicate winning party for each constituency.

The 1999 Wan Chai District Council election was held on 28 November 1999 to elect all 11 elected members to the 14-member District Council.

== Overall election results ==
Before election:

↓
3	7
Pro-democracy	Pro-Beijing

Change in composition:

↓
2	9
Pro-dem	Pro-Beijing

Wan Chai District Council election result 1999
Party	Seats	Gains	Losses	Net gain/loss	Seats %	Votes %	Votes	+/−
Democratic	2	0	1	–1	18.2	28.2	2,803	–6.2
DAB	3	0	0	0	27.3	27.3	2,706	+8.7
Liberal	1	1	0	+1	9.1	18.7	1,855	+10.6
HKPA	1	0	0	0	9.1	14.1	1,398	
Independent	3	1	0	+1	27.3	11.7	1,164	
CRA	1	0	0	0	9.1	0	0	

== Results by constituency ==
=== Broadwood ===
Broadwood
Party	Candidate	Votes	%	±%
Liberal	Ada Wong Ying-kay	883	68.9	
Independent	Pong Ho-wing	398	31.1	
Majority		485	37.9	(new)
Liberal win (new seat)				

=== Canal Road ===
Canal Road
Party	Candidate	Votes	%	±%
DAB	Suen Kai-cheong	uncontested		
DAB hold		Swing	N/A	

=== Causeway Bay ===
Causeway Bay
Party	Candidate	Votes	%	±%
Democratic	John Tse Wing-ling	783	45.6	
DAB	Kenny Lee Kwun-yee	630	36.7	
Liberal	Simon Lee Chao-fu	289	16.8	
Democratic hold		Swing		

=== Happy Valley ===
Happy Valley
Party	Candidate	Votes	%	±%
HKPA	Stephen Ng Kam-chun	1,398	82.6	+24.4
Democratic	Tang Ping	285	16.8	
Majority		1,113	65.8	+63.5
HKPA hold		Swing	N/A	

=== Hennessy ===
Hennessy
Party	Candidate	Votes	%	±%
CRA	San Stephen Wong Hon-ching	uncontested		
CRA hold		Swing		

=== Jardine's Lookout ===
Jardine's Lookout
Party	Candidate	Votes	%	±%
Nonpartisan	Alice Tso Shing-yuk	uncontested		
Nonpartisan hold		Swing	N/A	

=== Oi Kwan ===
Oi Kwan
Party	Candidate	Votes	%	±%
DAB	Anna Tang King-yung	uncontested		
DAB hold		Swing	N/A	

=== Southorn ===
Southorn
Party	Candidate	Votes	%	±%
Independent	Peggy Lam Pei	uncontested		
Independent hold		Swing		

=== Stubbs Road ===
Stubbs Road
Party	Candidate	Votes	%	±%
Nonpartisan	Ronald Fung	766	43.35	
Liberal	Selina Chow Liang Shuk-yee	683	38.65	+4.75
Democratic	Mark Li Kin-yin	318	17.80	–25.67
Majority		83	4.70	N/A
Nonpartisan hold		Swing	N/A	

=== Tai Fat Hau ===
Tai Fat Hau
Party	Candidate	Votes	%	±%
DAB	Lo Tin-sown	1,275	69.7	+15.8
Democratic	Terence So Kai-kuen	540	29.5	–10.0
Majority		735	40.2	+25.8
DAB hold		Swing	+12.9	

=== Tai Hang ===
Tai Hang
Party	Candidate	Votes	%	±%
Democratic	Bonson Lee Hing-wai	877	51.8	−7.1
DAB	Yuen Chun-chuen	801	47.3	+6.2
Democratic hold		Swing		

== See also ==
- 1999 Hong Kong local elections
