= 2015 Wan Chai District Council election =

Hong Kong local election

- 22 November 2015

All 13 seats to Wan Chai District Council 7 seats needed for a majority
- Turnout: 42.7%
	First party	Second party	Third party
Party	DAB	NPP	Liberal
Last election	3 seats, 16.4%	1 seat, 6.2%	0 seat, 3.1%
Seats before	3	1	0
Seats won	4	1	1
Seat change	▲1	Steady	▲1
Popular vote	3,890	3,384	1,479
Percentage	15.3%	13.3%	5.8%
Swing	▼1.1%	▲7.1%	▲2.7%
- Colours on map indicate winning party for each constituency.

The 2015 Wan Chai District Council election was held on 22 November 2015 to elect all 15 members to the Wan Chai District Council.

The pro-Beijing camp remained control of the council with the Democratic Alliance for the Betterment and Progress of Hong Kong retained the largest party status with three seats. In Tai Hang, "Umbrella soldier" Claris Yeung Suet-ying who, inspired by the 2014 Hong Kong protests, took a seat from New People's Party.

== Overall election results ==
Before election:

↓
2	9
PD	Pro-Beijing

Change in composition:

↓
2	11
PD	Pro-Beijing

Wan Chai District Council election result 2015
Party	Seats	Gains	Losses	Net gain/loss	Seats %	Votes %	Votes	+/−
Independent	7	2	2	0	53.8	57.9	14,737	
DAB	4	1	0	+1	30.8	15.3	3,890	−1.1
NPP	1	1	1	0	7.7	13.3	3,384	+7.1
Liberal	1	1	0	+1	7.7	5.8	1,479	+2.7
Democratic	0	0	0	0	0	4.0	1,021	–6.2
LSD	0	0	0	0	0	3.7	939	±0.0

== Results by constituency ==
=== Broadwood ===
Broadwood
Party	Candidate	Votes	%	±%
Independent	Paul Tse Wai-chun	1,350	55.6	
LSD	Michael Mak Kwok-fung	939	38.6	+1.6
Independent	Siu See-kong	141	5.8	
Majority		411	23.0	–3.0
Independent gain from Independent		Swing		

=== Canal Road ===
Canal Road
Party	Candidate	Votes	%	±%
DAB	Jacqueline Chung Ka-man	1,018	58.5	
Nonpartisan	Gloria Ho Wing-ka	723	41.5	
Majority		295	17.0	
DAB hold		Swing		

=== Causeway Bay ===
Causeway Bay
Party	Candidate	Votes	%	±%
Independent	Yolanda Ng Yuen-ting	uncontested		
Independent hold		Swing		

=== Happy Valley ===
Happy Valley
Party	Candidate	Votes	%	±%
Independent	Stephen Ng Kam-chun	1,377	60.5	+5.0
Nonpartisan	Kelvin Chien Ka-wo	900	39.5	
Majority		477	21.0	–10.0
Independent hold		Swing		

=== Hennessy ===
Hennessy
Party	Candidate	Votes	%	±%
Nonpartisan	Cheng Ki-kin	1,590	67.7	–22.0
Independent	Cheong Man-lei	760	32.3	
Majority		830	45.4	–34.0
Independent hold		Swing		

=== Jardine's Lookout ===
Jardine's Lookout
Party	Candidate	Votes	%	±%
Liberal	Wind Lam Wai-man	1,479	57.4	+24.1
Independent	David Lai	1,098	42.6	–10.1
Majority		381	14.8	–4.6
Liberal gain from Independent		Swing	+17.1	

=== Oi Kwan ===
Oi Kwan
Party	Candidate	Votes	%	±%
DAB	Anna Tang King-yung	1,367	59.9	–8.1
Nonpartisan	Wong Sui-lung	915	40.1	
Majority		452	19.8	–16.2
DAB hold		Swing		

=== Southorn ===
Southorn
Party	Candidate	Votes	%	±%
Independent	Lee Pik-yee	1,463	75.6	–7.6
Nonpartisan	Yeung Yau-fung	437	23.0	
Majority		1,026	52.6	–13.8
Independent hold		Swing		

=== Stubbs Road ===
Stubbs Road
Party	Candidate	Votes	%	±%
Nonpartisan	Wong Wang-tai	1,150	64.2	–2.9
Nonpartisan	Au Lai-chong	642	35.8	
Majority		508	28.4	–5.8
Nonpartisan hold		Swing		

=== Tai Fat Hau ===
Tai Fat Hau
Party	Candidate	Votes	%	±%
DAB	Kenny Lee Kwun-yee	1,505	65.5	–8.8
Nonpartisan	Leung Pak-kin	793	34.5	
Majority		712	31.0	–17.6
DAB hold		Swing		

=== Tai Hang ===
Tai Hang
Party	Candidate	Votes	%	±%
Independent	Clarisse Yeung Suet-ying	1,398	54.9	–7.3
NPP	Gigi Wong Ching-chi	1,148	45.1	
Majority		250	9.8	–1.7
Independent gain from NPP		Swing		

=== Tin Hau ===
Tin Hau
Party	Candidate	Votes	%	±%
NPP	Joey Lee Man-lung	2,236	68.7	+3.8
Democratic	Chan Kin-kwok	1,021	31.3	–3.8
Majority		1,215	37.4	
NPP hold		Swing	+3.8	

=== Victoria Park ===
Victoria Park
Party	Candidate	Votes	%	±%
DAB	Jennifer Chow Kit-bing	uncontested		
DAB hold		Swing		
