= 2011 Wan Chai District Council election =

Hong Kong local election

- 6 November 2011

11 (of the 13) seats to Wan Chai District Council 7 seats needed for a majority
- Turnout: 37.0%
	First party	Second party
Party	DAB	NPP
Last election	2 seats, 17.9%	New party
Seats before	3	1
Seats won	3	1
Seat change	Steady	Steady
Popular vote	3,317	1,266
Percentage	16.4%	6.2%
Swing	▼1.5%	N/A
- Colours on map indicate winning party for each constituency.

The 2011 Wan Chai District Council election was held on 6 November 2011 to elect all 11 elected members to the 13-member District Council.

The pro-Beijing camp remained control of the council with the Democratic Alliance for the Betterment and Progress of Hong Kong retained the largest party status with three seats. In Broadwood, incumbent Michael Mak Kwok-fung of the pro-democracy League of Social Democrats lost to independent Pamela Peck Wan-kam.

== Overall election results ==
Before election:

↓
4	7
Pro-democracy	Pro-Beijing

Change in composition:

↓
2	9
PD	Pro-Beijing

Wan Chai District Council election result 2011
Party	Seats	Gains	Losses	Net gain/loss	Seats %	Votes %	Votes	+/−
Independent	7	1	1	0	63.6	48.5	9,817	
DAB	3	0	0	0	27.3	16.4	3,317	−1.5
Democratic	0	0	0	0	0	10.2	2,064	+5.4
Civic	0	0	0	0	0	6.3	1,272	−0.3
NPP	1	0	0	0	9.1	6.2	1,266	
PfD	0	0	0	0	0	4.6	934	
LSD	0	0	1	−1	0	3.7	742	+0.6
Liberal	0	0	0	0	0	3.1	626	−1.4
People Power	0	0	0	0	0	1.1	221	

== Results by constituency ==
=== Broadwood ===
Broadwood
Party	Candidate	Votes	%	±%
Independent	Pamela Peck Wan-kam	1,262	63.0	
LSD	Michael Mak Kwok-fung	742	37.0	–10.0
Majority		520	26.0	+9.8
Independent gain from LSD		Swing		

=== Canal Road ===
Canal Road
Party	Candidate	Votes	%	±%
DAB	Jacqueline Chung Ka-man	uncontested		
DAB hold		Swing		

=== Causeway Bay ===
Causeway Bay
Party	Candidate	Votes	%	±%
Independent	Yolanda Ng Yuen-ting	1,350	75.0	+20.9
Democratic	Fong Yik-lam	369	20.5	
People Power	Kong Kwok-chu	80	4.4	
Majority		981	54.5	+8.2
Independent hold		Swing		

=== Happy Valley ===
Happy Valley
Party	Candidate	Votes	%	±%
Independent	Stephen Ng Kam-chun	1,422	65.5	+1.0
Civic	Tsang Kin-chiu	748	34.5	–1.0
Majority		673	31.0	+2.0
Independent hold		Swing	+1.0	

=== Hennessy ===
Hennessy
Party	Candidate	Votes	%	±%
Independent	Cheng Ki-kin	1,625	89.7	+12.0
Nonpartisan	Catherine Wong Kit-ning	187	10.3	−6.3
Majority		1,438	79.4	+71.2
Independent hold		Swing		

=== Jardine's Lookout ===
Jardine's Lookout
Party	Candidate	Votes	%	±%
Nonpartisan	David Lai	992	52.7	–2.7
Liberal	Lee Ian-on	626	33.3	–11.3
Independent	Lee Chak-man	264	14.0	
Majority		366	19.4	+8.6
Nonpartisan hold		Swing		

=== Oi Kwan ===
Oi Kwan
Party	Candidate	Votes	%	±%
DAB	Anna Tang King-yung	1,552	68.0	–7.4
Democratic	Mark Li Kin-yin	730	32.0	
Majority		822	36.0	–14.8
DAB hold		Swing		

=== Southorn ===
Southorn
Party	Candidate	Votes	%	±%
Independent	Lee Pik-yee	1,604	83.2	+23.6
PfD	Chung Chor-kit	324	16.8	
Majority		1,280	66.4	+38.6
Independent hold		Swing		

=== Stubbs Road ===
Stubbs Road
Party	Candidate	Votes	%	±%
Nonpartisan	Wong Wang-tai	1,068	67.1	+12.0
Civic	Ng Yin-keung	524	32.9	–12.0
Majority		544	34.2	+32.9
Nonpartisan hold		Swing	+12.0	

=== Tai Fat Hau ===
Tai Fat Hau
Party	Candidate	Votes	%	±%
DAB	Kenny Lee Kwun-yee	1,765	74.3	+26.9
PfD	Lo Kin-ming	610	25.7	–10.9
Majority		1,155	48.6	+28.1
DAB hold		Swing	+18.9	

=== Tai Hang ===
Tai Hang
Party	Candidate	Votes	%	±%
NPP	Wong Chor-fung	1,266	52.4	–0.4
Democratic	Sin Chung-kai	965	40.9	–6.3
People Power (Power Voters)	Christopher Lau Gar-hung	141	5.8	
Independent	Richard Shum See-hoi	43	1.8	
Majority		301	11.5	+5.9
NPP hold		Swing		
