= 1988 Wan Chai District Board election =

Hong Kong local election

- 10 March 1988

10 (of the 16) seats to Wan Chai District Board 9 seats needed for a majority
- Turnout: 20.6%
	First party	Second party
Party	Civic	HKAS
Last election	1 seat, 9.2%	Did not run
Seats before	1	2
Seats won	3	2
Seat change	▲2	Steady
Popular vote	6,718	4,863
Percentage	43.9%	31.8%
Swing	▲34.7%	N/A

The 1988 Wan Chai District Board election was held on 10 March 1988 to elect all 10 elected members to the 16-member Wan Chai District Board.

== Overall election results ==
Before election:

↓
3	7
Liberals	Conservatives

Change in composition:

↓
3	7
Liberals	Conservatives

Wan Chai District Board election result 1988
Party	Seats	Gains	Losses	Net gain/loss	Seats %	Votes %	Votes	+/−
Civic	3	2	0	+2	30.0	43.9	6,718	+34.7
Independent	5	0	2	–2	50.0	24.2	3,716	
HKAS	2	0	0	0	10.0	31.8	4,863	

== Results by constituency ==
=== Causeway Bay Central ===
Causeway Bay Central
Party	Candidate	Votes	%	±%
Civic	Lee Lau-shek	1,800	62.4	
Civic	Ho Suk-wan	1,325	45.9	
HKAS	Lam Kin-wing	1,267	43.9	
Civic gain from Nonpartisan		Swing		
Civic hold		Swing		

=== Happy Valley ===
Happy Valley
Party	Candidate	Votes	%	±%
Civic	Lee Yiu-kwong	1,738	64.3	
HKAS (PHKS)	Albert Cheung Chi-piu	1,350	49.9	
Civic	Ho Yuk-wing	1,002	37.0	
Civic gain from Nonpartisan		Swing		
HKAS hold		Swing		

=== Tai Hang and So Kon Po ===
Tai Hang and So Kon Po
Party	Candidate	Votes	%	±%
HKAS	Vivien Chan Wan-wan	1,591	70.0	
Nonpartisan	Arthur Cham Yau-tong	1,139	50.1	
HKAS	Au Cheuk-ki	655	28.8	
HKAS hold		Swing		
Nonpartisan hold		Swing		

=== Wan Chai East ===
Wan Chai East
Party	Candidate	Votes	%	±%
Nonpartisan	San Stephen Wong Hon-ching	uncontested		
Nonpartisan	Peggy Lam Pei	uncontested		
Nonpartisan hold		Swing		
Nonpartisan hold		Swing		

=== Wan Chai West ===
Wan Chai West
Party	Candidate	Votes	%	±%
Nonpartisan	Tang King-yung	1,499	59.6	
Nonpartisan	Chung Yee-on	1,078	42.9	
Civic	Wong Sing-kwan	853	33.9	
Nonpartisan hold		Swing		
Nonpartisan hold		Swing		

== See also ==
- 1988 Hong Kong local elections
