= 1991 Wan Chai District Board election =

Hong Kong local election

- 3 March 1991

10 (of the 15) seats to Wan Chai District Board 8 seats needed for a majority
- Turnout: 20.5%
	First party	Second party
Party	United Democrats	Civic
Last election	New party	3 seats, 43.9%
Seats before	1	3
Seats won	2	1
Seat change	▲1	▼2
Popular vote	2,346	2,803
Percentage	22.3%	26.7%
Swing	N/A	▼16.2%
	Third party	Fourth party
Party	Citizen Forum	CRA
Last election	New party	Did not run
Seats before	1	1
Seats won	1	1
Seat change	▲1	Steady
Popular vote	1,276	Uncontested
Percentage	13.8%	N/A
Swing	N/A	N/A

The 1991 Wan Chai District Board election was held on 3 March 1991 to elect all 10 elected members to the 15-member Wan Chai District Board.

== Overall election results ==
Before election:

↓
3	2	5
Liberals	PB	Conservatives

Change in composition:

↓
4	3	3
Liberals	Pro-Beijing	Conservatives

Wan Chai District Board election result 1991
Party	Seats	Gains	Losses	Net gain/loss	Seats %	Votes %	Votes	+/−
Independent	5	1	2	–1	50.0	34.7	3,207	
Civic	1	0	2	–2	10.0	26.7	2,803	
United Democrats	2	1	0	+1	20.0	22.3	2,346	
Citizen Forum	1	1	0	+1	10.0	13.8	1,276	
HKDF	0	0	0	0	0	8.3	875	
CRA	1	0	0	0	10.0	0	0	

== Results by constituency ==
=== Causeway Bay Central ===
Causeway Bay Central
Party	Candidate	Votes	%	±%
United Democrats	Pak Sum	1,023	38.3	
Citizen Forum	Suen Kai-cheong	908	34.0	
HKDF	Chan Jink-chou	875	32.7	
Civic	Ho Suk-wan	700	26.2	
Civic	Ma Look-chiu	603	22.6	
United Democrats gain from Civic		Swing		
Citizen Forum gain from Civic		Swing		

=== Happy Valley ===
Happy Valley
Party	Candidate	Votes	%	±%
Civic	Stephen Ng Kam-chun	1,500	58.2	
Nonpartisan	Albert Cheung Chi-piu	1,219	47.3	–2.6
Nonpartisan	Helen Chung Yee-fong	1,111	43.1	
Civic hold		Swing		
Nonpartisan hold		Swing		

=== Tai Hang and So Kon Po ===
Tai Hang and So Kon Po
Party	Candidate	Votes	%	±%
United Democrats	Susanna Yeung Wan-king	1,323	71.7	
Nonpartisan	Cheng Kwong-ming	877	47.5	
Citizen Forum	Kwan Pak-lam	368	19.9	
United Democrats hold		Swing		
Nonpartisan gain from Nonpartisan		Swing		

=== Wan Chai East ===
Wan Chai East
Party	Candidate	Votes	%	±%
Nonpartisan	San Stephen Wong Hon-ching	uncontested		
Nonpartisan	Peggy Lam Pei	uncontested		
Nonpartisan hold		Swing		
Nonpartisan hold		Swing		

=== Wan Chai West ===
Wan Chai West
Party	Candidate	Votes	%	±%
Nonpartisan	Chung Yee-on	uncontested		
CRA	Tang King-yung	uncontested		
Nonpartisan hold		Swing		
CRA hold		Swing		

== See also ==
- 1991 Hong Kong local elections
