= Tin Hau (constituency) =

- Former Elected constituency for the Wan Chai District Council
- Boundary of Tin Hau in Wan Chai District
- District: Eastern (1994–2015); Wan Chai (2015–present)
- Legislative Council constituency: Hong Kong Island East
- Population: 15,051 (2019)
- Electorate: 7,825 (2019)

Former constituency
- Created: 1994
- Abolished: 2023
- Number of members: One
- Created from: Causeway Bay South

Tin Hau was one of the 13 constituencies of the Wan Chai District Council of Hong Kong. It returned one member of the district council until it was abolished the 2023 electoral reforms. It was first created in Hong Kong district board elections, 1994. The constituency boundary was loosely based on the Tin Hau and Lai Tak Tsuen with estimated population of 15,051. It was transferred to the Wan Chai District in the District Council election in 2015.

== Councillors represented ==
Election	Member	Party	%
1994	Ip Chiu-shing	Independent	55.26
1999	Ip Chiu-shing	Independent	68.80
2003	Ip Chiu-shing	Independent	52.91
2007	Ip Chiu-shing	Independent	50.82
2011	Joey Lee Man-lung	Independent→NPP	64.90
2015	Joey Lee Man-lung	NPP→Independent	68.65
2019	Chan Yuk-lam→Vacant (Note: Resigned on 9 July 2021.)	Independent	52.50

== Election results ==
=== 2010s ===
Wan Chai District Council Election, 2019: Tin Hau
Party	Candidate	Votes	%	±%
Independent	Chan Yuk-lam	2,899	52.50	
Independent	Joey Lee Man-lung	2,623	47.50	
Majority		276	5.00	
Turnout		5,541	70.81	
Independent gain from Independent		Swing		

Wan Chai District Council Election, 2015: Tin Hau
Party	Candidate	Votes	%	±%
NPP	Joey Lee Man-lung	2,236	68.7	+3.8
Democratic	Chan Kin-kwok	1,021	31.3	–3.8
Majority		1,215	37.4	
Turnout		3,316	45.5	
NPP hold		Swing	+3.8	

Eastern District Council Election, 2011: Tin Hau
Party	Candidate	Votes	%	±%
Independent	Joey Lee Man-lung	1,995	64.9	
Democratic	Chan Kin-kwok	1,079	35.1	−14.1
Independent gain from Nonpartisan		Swing		

=== 2000s ===
Eastern District Council Election, 2007: Tin Hau
Party	Candidate	Votes	%	±%
Nonpartisan	Ip Chiu-shing	1,428	50.8	−2.1
Democratic	Chan Kin-kwok	1,382	49.2	+2.1
Nonpartisan hold		Swing		

Eastern District Council Election, 2003: Tin Hau
Party	Candidate	Votes	%	±%
Nonpartisan	Ip Chiu-shing	1,636	52.9	−15.4
Democratic	Chan Kin-kwok	1,456	47.1	
Nonpartisan hold		Swing		

=== 1990s ===
Eastern District Council Election, 1999: Tin Hau
Party	Candidate	Votes	%	±%
Nonpartisan	Ip Chiu-shing	1,806	68.3	+13.7
Nonpartisan	Annie Lau Yuk-fong	819	31.0	
Nonpartisan hold		Swing		

Eastern District Board Election, 1994: Tin Hau
Party	Candidate	Votes	%	±%
Nonpartisan	Ip Chiu-shing	1,545	54.7	
Democratic	Chan Kin-kwok	1,251	44.3	
Nonpartisan win (new seat)				
