= 1985 Wan Chai District Board election =

Hong Kong local election

- 7 March 1985

10 (of the 16) seats to Wan Chai District Board 9 seats needed for a majority
- Turnout: 30.1%
	First party	Second party
Party	Reform	Civic
Last election	Did not run	1 seat, 19.6%
Seats before	0	1
Seats won	2	1
Seat change	▲2	Steady
Popular vote	5,212	2,696
Percentage	17.8%	9.2%
Swing	▲34.7%	▼10.4%

The 1985 Wan Chai District Board election was held on 7 March 1985 to elect all 10 elected members to the 16-member Wan Chai District Board.

== Overall election results ==
Wan Chai District Board election result 1985
Party	Seats	Gains	Losses	Net gain/loss	Seats %	Votes %	Votes	+/−
Independent	7	6	3	+3	70.0	73.0	21,379	
Reform	2	2	0	+2	20.0	17.8	5,212	
Civic	1	0	0	0	10.0	9.2	2,696	–10.4

== Results by constituency ==
=== Causeway Bay Central ===
Causeway Bay Central
Party	Candidate	Votes	%	±%
Nonpartisan	Wong Man-fu	2,166	56.7	
Civic	Ho Suk-wan	1,574	41.2	
Reform	Lee Wing-na	1,439	37.7	
Nonpartisan	Wong Tak-keung	963	25.2	
Nonpartisan	Wu Foo-sang	176	4.6	
Nonpartisan win (new seat)				
Civic hold		Swing		

=== Happy Valley ===
Happy Valley
Party	Candidate	Votes	%	±%
Nonpartisan	Lester Kwok Chi-hang	2,926	75.5	
Nonpartisan	Albert Cheung Chi-piu	1,374	35.5	
Civic	Lee Man-ho	1,122	29.0	
Nonpartisan	Ho Yuk-wing	881	22.7	
Nonpartisan win (new seat)				
Nonpartisan hold		Swing		

=== Tai Hang and So Kon Po ===
Tai Hang and So Kon Po
Party	Candidate	Votes	%	±%
Reform	Vivien Chan Wan-wan	2,011	79.6	
Nonpartisan	Arthur Cham Yau-tong	1,218	48.2	
Nonpartisan	Chu Wing-kei	529	21.0	
Reform gain from Nonpartisan		Swing		
Nonpartisan win (new seat)				

=== Wan Chai East ===
Wan Chai East
Party	Candidate	Votes	%	±%
Nonpartisan	Peggy Lam Pei	3,089	73.1	
Reform	San Stephen Wong Hon-ching	1,762	41.7	
Nonpartisan	Fan Kwong-chung	1,085	25.7	
Nonpartisan	Leung Yan-wok	856	20.3	
Nonpartisan	Tam Kam-shing	699	16.5	
Nonpartisan gain from Nonpartisan		Swing		
Reform win (new seat)				

=== Wan Chai West ===
Wan Chai West
Party	Candidate	Votes	%	±%
Nonpartisan	Chung Yee-on	1,989	58.4	
Nonpartisan	Tang King-yung	1,214	35.6	
Nonpartisan	Kwong Hon-wah	1,143	33.5	
Nonpartisan	Wong Shing-kwan	1,071	31.4	
Nonpartisan gain from Nonpartisan		Swing		
Nonpartisan win (new seat)				

== See also ==
- 1985 Hong Kong local elections
