= 1982 Wan Chai District Board election =

Hong Kong local election

- 23 September 1982

5 (of the 17) seats to Wan Chai District Board 9 seats needed for a majority
- Turnout: 27.5%
| | First party |
|---|---|
| Party | Civic |
| Seats won | 1 |
| Popular vote | 2,510 |
| Percentage | 19.6% |

The 1982 Wan Chai District Board election was held on 23 September to elect all 5 elected members to the 17-member Wan Chai District Board.

== Overall election results ==
Wan Chai District Board election result 1982
| Party | Seats | Gains | Losses | Net gain/loss | Seats % | Votes % | Votes | +/− |
|---|---|---|---|---|---|---|---|---|
| Independent | 4 | 4 | 0 | +4 | 80.0 | 80.4 | 20,314 | |
| Civic | 1 | 1 | 0 | +1 | 20.0 | 19.6 | 2,510 | |

== Results by constituency ==
=== Causeway Bay Central ===
Causeway Bay Central
| Party | Candidate | Votes | % | ±% |
|---|---|---|---|---|
| Civic | Lee Kwan | 2,166 | 66.5 | |
| Nonpartisan | Cheng Hok-yin | 833 | 22.1 | |
| Nonpartisan | Wong Tak-keung | 418 | 11.1 | |
| Civic win (new seat) | | | | |

=== Happy Valley ===
Happy Valley
| Party | Candidate | Votes | % | ±% |
|---|---|---|---|---|
| Nonpartisan | Albert Cheung Chi-piu | 929 | 50.7 | |
| Nonpartisan | Ho Yuk-wing | 881 | 48.1 | |
| Nonpartisan win (new seat) | | | | |

=== Tai Hang and So Kon Po ===
Tai Hang and So Kon Po
| Party | Candidate | Votes | % | ±% |
|---|---|---|---|---|
| Nonpartisan | Chu Wing-kei | 593 | 39.9 | |
| Nonpartisan | Wong Man-fu | 506 | 34.0 | |
| Nonpartisan | Chow Yam-wah | 376 | 25.3 | |
| Nonpartisan win (new seat) | | | | |

=== Wan Chai East ===
Wan Chai East
| Party | Candidate | Votes | % | ±% |
|---|---|---|---|---|
| Nonpartisan | Chung Lau Sin-yee | 1,499 | 51.3 | |
| Nonpartisan | Ho Fook-chu | 743 | 25.4 | |
| Nonpartisan | Tam Kam-shing | 670 | 22.9 | |
| Nonpartisan win (new seat) | | | | |

=== Wan Chai West ===
Wan Chai West
| Party | Candidate | Votes | % | ±% |
|---|---|---|---|---|
| Nonpartisan | Ng Sai-ying | 1,213 | 42.1 | |
| Nonpartisan | Wong Tin-yau | 904 | 31.4 | |
| Nonpartisan | Lee Ming-tak | 749 | 26.0 | |
| Nonpartisan win (new seat) | | | | |

== See also ==
- 1982 Hong Kong local elections
