= 2019 Wan Chai District Council election =

Hong Kong local election

- 24 November 2019

All 13 seats to Wan Chai District Council 7 seats needed for a majority
- Turnout: 67.9% ▲15.2%
	First party	Second party	Third party
Party	Liberal	VSA	DAB
Last election	1 seat, 5.8%	Did not contest	4 seats, 15.3%
Seats before	0	0	4
Seats won	1	1	0
Seat change	Steady	▲1	▼4
Popular vote	2,570	2,502	6,883
Percentage	5.1%	4.9%	14.3%
Swing	▼0.7%	N/A	▼1.0%
- Colours on map indicate winning party for each constituency.

The 2019 Wan Chai District Council election was held on 24 November 2019 to elect all 15 members to the Wan Chai District Council.

The Kickstart Wan Chai, a pro-democracy local political group led by Claris Yeung Suet-ying, incumbent District Councillor of Tai Hang and consisting of a group of young fresh faces ran under the banner of independent and scored the most seats, while the Democratic Alliance for the Betterment and Progress of Hong Kong lost all its seats in the district.

== Overall election results ==
↓
41.17%	58.83%
Pro-democracy	Pro-Beijing

↓
2	11
Pro-dem	Pro-Beijing

Change in composition:

↓
53.18%	46.82%
Pro-democracy	Pro-Beijing

↓
9	4
Pro-democracy	Pro-Beijing

Wan Chai District Council election result 2019
Party	Seats	Gains	Losses	Net gain/loss	Seats %	Votes %	Votes	+/−
Independent	8	7	4	+3	61.5	76.0	38,540	
DAB	0	0	4	−4	0.0	13.6	6,883	−1.7
Liberal	1	0	0	0	7.7	5.1	2,570	−0.7
VSA	1	1	0	+1	0	4.9	2,502	
2047 HK Monitor	0	0	0	0	0	0.4	207	
