= Michael Mak =

Michael Mak may refer to:

- Michael Mak (politician), Hong Kong politician
- Michael Mak (director), Hong Kong film director
