= Cathy Yau =

Chinese district councillor

Cathy Yau Man-shan (邱汶珊) is a former District Councillor in the Causeway Bay constituency of Hong Kong. After 11 years as a police officer in the Hong Kong Police Force she resigned in July 2019 and ran as an independent candidate in the 2019 elections where she won the seat with 54.96% (1,918) of the votes. In 2003 she was involved in the efforts to remove Hong Kong's first chief executive Tung Chee-hwa as a result of his push for National Security Legislation. In a letter directed to residents in Causeway Bay, she said that at the time of the start of the 2019–20 Hong Kong protests in mid-July 2019 she "decided to take off my uniform and gear, and stand together with Hongkongers", saying that "political issues should be addressed with political means, not baton or other weapons." Cathy Yau is a member of Kickstart Wanchai.
