= Pamela Peck =

Hong Kong politician

- Chinese: 白韻琹
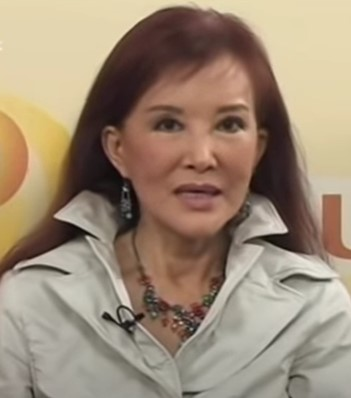
- Interviewed by OurTV.hk in 2009
- Born: Peck Wan-kam; 1 September 1944 (age 82); Japanese Occupied Territory of Hong Kong
- Other name: 白韻琴
- Education: St. Paul's Secondary School; San Francisco State University
- Years active: 1974–2014
- Known for: Candidate in 2010 Hong Kong by-election (Kowloon West)
- Spouse: Paul Tse (m. 1997)
- Relatives: Bai Chongxi (uncle); Pai Hsien-yung (cousin)
- Criminal information
- Status: released
- Criminal charges: Tax fraud
- Penalty: 3 months in prison

Chinese name
- Traditional Chinese: 白韻琹
- Simplified Chinese: 白韵琹
Transcriptions
Standard Mandarin
- Hanyu Pinyin: Bái Yùnqín
Yue: Cantonese
- Jyutping: Baak^{6} Wan^{6}kam^{4}

Alternative Chinese name
- Traditional Chinese: 白韻琴
- Simplified Chinese: 白韵琴
Transcriptions
Standard Mandarin
- Hanyu Pinyin: Bái Yùnqín
Yue: Cantonese
- Jyutping: Baak^{6} Wan^{6}kam^{4}

Pamela Peck Wan-kam (Chinese: 白韻琹, born on September 1, 1944) was a Hong Kong radio agony aunt and celebrity and is a former member of Wan Chai District Council. Since 1989 she has been the partner of 'celebrity' lawyer and legislator Paul Tse.

== Early life ==
Peck came to Hong Kong from China when she was three months old. Her dad died and her mother could not support her, so she went to live with her mother's sister, accompanied by her wet nurse.

She says that her uncle was 'dissolute' and would often bring girlfriends home. But her aunt befriended them so that they left.

Peck was seen by social welfare officers. At around age 15, she ran away with a boyfriend, missing her HKCEE exams.

== Career ==
She became a flight attendant and hosted radio programmes when having a hiatus from flying. She later went back to school to pursue her education, and later studied TV broadcasting at the graduate school of San Francisco State University.

The public named her as 白小姐 or 白姐姐 during the launch of her phone-in radio talk show Heart To Heart (盡訴心中情) in 1986.

Later, on her radio show Talk of the Town ,people discussed their love life on air, on which she gave typically pithy but practical advice.

Apart from her talk show, Peck is an author; she writes columns periodically in various Hong Kong magazines and newspapers. The articles were later collected into books.

== Conviction and imprisonment for tax evasion ==
On 19 April 2001, Peck was convicted of tax fraud and sentenced to three months in prison. She had forged meal receipts and employee salary records to evade $210,000 in taxes.

She pled guilty to four counts of assisting Platinum Promotion Ltd with intent to evade tax between 1994 and 1998 – effectively four taxation years – by signing fraudulent returns. She held 99.9 per cent of the shares in the company.

Peck served her sentence at Tai Lam Centre for Women. While serving her sentence, she was not allowed to contribute to any of the publications for which she wrote columns.

Since the mid-1990s she has been the partner of prominent lawyer and legislator Paul Tse. Tse is also her legal representative.

== Film ==
Year	Title	Role
1974	Chinatown Capers 小英雄大鬧唐人街	Master Chang's sister
1988	Midnight Whispers 盡訴心中情	Radio hostess
2010	Perfect Wedding 抱抱俏佳人	TV host

== TV series ==
Year	Title	Role
1978	Below the Lion Rock: Meng De Xuan Ze 獅子山下: 夢的選擇 (RTHK)	Tong Sin
1981	Young Wong Fei Hung 少年黃飛鴻 (RTV)	Empress Dowager Lung-Yu
1981	Princess Cheung Ping 武俠帝女花 (RTV)	Empress Dowager Hau-chong
1981	Angel in Crisis 天使危機 (RTV)	Hui Wai-fun
1984	Empress Wu 武則天 (ATV)	Empress Cheung-suen
1989	The Vixen's Tale 萬家傳說 (TVB)	Pak Yu-yin
1989	Greed 人海虎鯊 (TVB)	
1990	Rain in the Heart 成功路上 (TVB)	
1990	The Gods and Demons of Zu Mountain 蜀山奇俠 (TVB)	Jade Raksha
1991	Man from Guangdong 我係黃飛鴻 (TVB)	Yap Sam-neung
1991	Days of Glory 豪門 (ATV)	Chan Yut-ha
1992	Once Upon Our Memory-The Miss Pregnant 今裝戲寶之玉女添丁 (ATV)	Michelle
1992	Laser Drama-The lucky family 鐳射劇場之清裝追女仔 (ATV)	

== Host ==
Year	Title
1978	Deui Jing Ha Yeuk 對症下藥 (RTHK)
1987	Echoes of the Heart 熱線訴心聲 (TVB)
1988	Endless Night 零時話風情 (TVB)
1989	Talk of The Town 妙論講場 (TVB)
2014	Midnight Whispers 盡訴心中情
2014	Pak Lung Wong Hau 白龍皇后

Political offices
Preceded by Michael Mak	Member of Wan Chai District Council; Representative for Broadwood; 2012–2015	Succeeded by Paul Tse
