= Southorn (constituency) =

- Former Elected constituency for the Wan Chai District Council
- Boundary of Southorn in Wan Chai District
- District: Wan Chai
- Legislative Council constituency: Hong Kong Island East
- Population: 14,665 (2019)
- Electorate: 5,060 (2019)

Former constituency
- Created: 1994
- Abolished: 2023
- Number of members: One

Southorn was one of the 13 constituencies in the Wan Chai District.

It returned one member of the district council until it was abolished the 2023 electoral reforms.

Southorn constituency was loosely based on Southorn Playground, Spring Garden Lane, Lee Tung Street and Hopewell Centre area of Wan Chai, covering the section of the Hennessy Road, Johnston Road, Queen's Road East, Kennedy Road, Bowen Road, and Magazine Gap Road in Wan Chai with estimated population of 14,665.

== Councillors represented ==
Election	Member	Party	%
1994	Peggy Lam Pei	Independent	67.91
1999	Peggy Lam Pei	Independent	N/A
2003	King Mary Ann Pui-wai	Civic Act-up	60.69
2007	Lee Pik-yee	Independent	59.57
2011	Lee Pik-yee	Independent	83.20
2015	Lee Pik-yee	Independent	77.00
2019	Lee Pik-yee	Independent	52.00

== Election results ==
=== 2010s ===
Wan Chai District Council Election, 2019: Southorn
Party	Candidate	Votes	%	±%
Independent	Lee Pik-yee	1,790	52.00	
Independent	Chris Chan Kam-shing	1,652	48.00	
Majority		138	4.00	
Turnout		3,451	68.22	
Independent hold		Swing		

Wan Chai District Council Election, 2015: Southorn
Party	Candidate	Votes	%	±%
Independent	Lee Pik-yee	1,463	75.6	–7.6
Nonpartisan	Yeung Yau-fung	437	23.0	
Majority		1,026	52.6	–13.8
Turnout		1,920	40.6	
Independent hold		Swing		

Wan Chai District Council Election, 2011: Southorn
Party	Candidate	Votes	%	±%
Independent	Lee Pik-yee	1,604	83.2	+23.6
PfD	Chung Chor-kit	324	16.8	
Majority		1,280	66.4	+38.6
Independent hold		Swing		

=== 2000s ===
Wan Chai District Council Election, 2007: Southorn
Party	Candidate	Votes	%	±%
Independent	Lee Pik-yee	1,080	59.6	
Civic Act-up	Kellogg Ngai	577	31.8	−28.9
Independent	Wong Kwok-hong	156	8.6	
Independent gain from Civic Act-up		Swing		

Wan Chai District Council Election, 2003: Southorn
Party	Candidate	Votes	%	±%
Civic Act-up	King Mary Ann Pui Wai	911	60.7	
DAB	Lau Pui-shan	590	39.3	
Civic Act-up gain from Independent		Swing		

=== 1990s ===
Wan Chai District Council Election, 1999: Southorn
Party	Candidate	Votes	%	±%
Independent	Peggy Lam Pei	uncontested		
Independent hold		Swing		

Wan Chai District Council Election, 1994: Southorn
Party	Candidate	Votes	%	±%
Independent	Peggy Lam Pei	1,297	67.4	
Democratic	Chan Miu-tak	511	26.6	
Independent	Ho Ka-cheung	102	5.3	
Independent win (new seat)				
