= Jardine's Lookout (constituency) =

- Former Elected constituency for the Wan Chai District Council
- Boundary of Jardine's Lookout in Wan Chai District
- District: Wan Chai
- Legislative Council constituency: Hong Kong Island East
- Population: 15,337 (2019)
- Electorate: 6,328 (2019)

Former constituency
- Created: 1994
- Abolished: 2023
- Number of members: One

Jardine's Lookout (Chinese: 渣甸山) is a former constituency in the Wan Chai District of Hong Kong. It returned one member of the district council until it was abolished the 2023 electoral reforms.

The constituency loosely covers Jardine's Lookout in Hong Kong Island with the estimated population of 15,337.

== Councillors represented ==
Election	Member	Party	%
1994	Alice Tso Shing-yuk	Liberal→Independent	36.82
1999	Alice Tso Shing-yuk	Independent	N/A
2003	Steve Chan Yiu-fai	Civic Act-up	66.61
2007	David Lai	Independent	55.43
2011	David Lai	Independent	52.71
2015	Wind Lam Wai-man	Liberal	57.39
2019	Wind Lam Wai-man	Liberal	58.56

== Election results ==
=== 2010s ===
Wan Chai District Council Election, 2019: Jardine's Lookout
Party	Candidate	Votes	%	±%
Liberal	Wind Lam Wai-man	2,570	58.56	
Independent	Charlton Cheung	1,355	30.87	
Nonpartisan	John Tse Wing-ling	464	10.57	
Majority		1,215	27.68	+12.88
Turnout		4,401	69.55	
Liberal hold		Swing		

Wan Chai District Council Election, 2015: Jardine's Lookout
Party	Candidate	Votes	%	±%
Liberal	Wind Lam Wai-man	1,479	57.4	+24.1
Independent	David Lai	1,098	42.6	–10.1
Majority		381	14.8	–4.6
Turnout		2,606	43.5	
Liberal gain from Independent		Swing	+17.1	

Wan Chai District Council Election, 2011: Jardine's Lookout
Party	Candidate	Votes	%	±%
Nonpartisan	David Lai	992	52.7	–2.7
Liberal	Lee Ian-on	626	33.3	–11.3
Independent	Lee Chak-man	264	14.0	
Majority		366	19.4	+8.6
Nonpartisan hold		Swing		

=== 2000s ===
Wan Chai District Council Election, 2007: Jardine's Lookout
Party	Candidate	Votes	%	±%
Nonpartisan	David Lai	755	55.4	
Liberal	Alice Tso Shing-yuk	607	44.6	
Majority		148	10.8	–22.4
Nonpartisan gain from Civic Act-up		Swing		

Wan Chai District Council Election, 2003: Jardine's Lookout
Party	Candidate	Votes	%	±%
Civic Act-up	Steve Chan Yiu-fai	1,219	66.6	
Nonpartisan	Pong Ho-wing	611	33.4	
Majority		608	33.2	
Civic Act-up gain from Liberal		Swing	N/A	

=== 1990s ===
Wan Chai District Council Election, 1999: Jardine's Lookout
Party	Candidate	Votes	%	±%
Nonpartisan	Alice Tso Shing-yuk	Uncontested		
Nonpartisan hold		Swing	N/A	

Wan Chai District Board Election, 1994: Jardine's Lookout
Party	Candidate	Votes	%	±%
Liberal	Alice Tso Shing-yuk	605	36.2	
HKDF	Kan Sheung-nim	575	34.4	
Nonpartisan	Thomas Chan Tin-chi	324	19.4	
Nonpartisan	James Cheng Chung-chin	139	8.3	
Majority		30	1.8	
Liberal win (new seat)				
