= Broadwood (constituency) =

- Former Elected constituency for the Wan Chai District Council
- Boundary of Broadwood in Wan Chai District
- District: Wan Chai
- Legislative Council constituency: Hong Kong Island East
- Population: 13,755 (2019)
- Electorate: 5,520 (2019)

Former constituency
- Created: 1999
- Abolished: 2023
- Number of members: One

Broadwood was one of the 13 constituencies of the Wan Chai District Council in Hong Kong. It returned one member of the district council until it was abolished the 2023 electoral reforms. The boundary was loosely based on the area of Broadwood Road.

== Councillors represented ==
Election	Member	Party	%
1999	Ada Wong Ying-kay	Liberal→Independent	68.93
2003	Ada Wong Ying-kay	Independent→Civic Act-up	N/A
2007	Michael Mak Kwok-fung	LSD	47.04
2011	Pamela Peck Wan-kam	Independent	62.97
2015	Paul Tse Wai-chun	Independent	55.56
2019	Paul Tse Wai-chun	Independent	52.92

== Election results ==
=== 2010s ===
Wan Chai District Council Election, 2019: Broadwood
Party	Candidate	Votes	%	±%
Independent	Paul Tse Wai-chun	2,121	52.92	−2.68
Independent	Yeung Tsz-chun	1,887	47.08	
Majority		234	5.84	
Turnout		4,018	72.79	
Independent hold		Swing		

Wan Chai District Council Election, 2015: Broadwood
Party	Candidate	Votes	%	±%
Independent	Paul Tse Wai-chun	1,350	55.6	
LSD	Michael Mak Kwok-fung	939	38.6	+1.6
Independent	Siu See-kong	141	5.8	
Majority		411	23.0	–3.0
Turnout		2,474	46.6	
Independent gain from Independent		Swing		

Wan Chai District Council Election, 2011: Broadwood
Party	Candidate	Votes	%	±%
Independent	Pamela Peck Wan-kam	1,262	63.0	
LSD	Michael Mak Kwok-fung	742	37.0	–10.0
Majority		520	26.0	+9.8
Independent gain from LSD		Swing		

=== 2000s ===
Wan Chai District Council Election, 2007: Broadwood
Party	Candidate	Votes	%	±%
LSD	Michael Mak Kwok-fung	604	47.04	
Independent	Wong Sui-wah	442	34.42	
Independent	Leung Chi-pui	238	18.54	
Majority		162	12.62	
LSD gain from Civic Act-up		Swing		

Wan Chai District Council Election, 2003: Broadwood
Party	Candidate	Votes	%	±%
Independent	Ada Wong Ying-kay	uncontested		
Independent hold		Swing		

=== 1990s ===
Wan Chai District Council Election, 1999: Broadwood
Party	Candidate	Votes	%	±%
Liberal	Ada Wong Ying-kay	883	68.9	
Independent	Pong Ho-wing	398	31.1	
Majority		485	37.9	(new)
Liberal win (new seat)				
