= Law Wai-shan =

Chinese district councilor

Susi Law Wai-shan (羅偉珊) is a former District Councillor for the Oi Kwan constituency in Hong Kong and a manager of artist hub Foo Tak Building in Wanchai.

In the 2019 District Council elections, she received 57.45% (2,363) of the vote. She was one of three artists who contested and won seats in the 2019 elections. Her published electoral message on the Hong Kong government website is to

"1) Enhance community participation and communal engagement, 2) Utilize and open up existing and new public spaces, 3) Promote green living, 4) Safeguard the freedom and rights of Hongkongers, 5) Monitor the District Council and the government".

Susi Law is a manager of Art & Cultural Outreach that leases and manages spaces in Foo Tak Building in Wan Chai.
