= Oi Kwan (constituency) =

Constituency in Hong Kong

- Former Elected constituency for the Wan Chai District Council
- Boundary of Oi Kwan in Wan Chai District
- District: Wan Chai
- Legislative Council constituency: Hong Kong Island East
- Population: 12,509 (2019)
- Electorate: 6,181 (2019)

Former constituency
- Created: 1994
- Abolished: 2023
- Number of members: One

Oi Kwan (Chinese: 愛群) was a former constituency in the Wan Chai District of Hong Kong. It returned one member of the district council until it was abolished the 2023 electoral reforms.

The constituency loosely covered Wan Chai in Hong Kong Island with the estimated population of 12,509.

== Councillors represented ==
Election	Member	Party	%
1994	Anna Tang King-yung	DAB	N/A
1999	Anna Tang King-yung	DAB	N/A
2003	Anna Tang King-yung	DAB	53.98
2007	Anna Tang King-yung	DAB	75.39
2011	Anna Tang King-yung	DAB	68.01
2015	Anna Tang King-yung	DAB	59.90
2019	Susi Law Wai-shan→Vacant (Note: Resigned on 9 July 2021.)	Independent	57.45

== Election results ==
=== 2010s ===
Wan Chai District Council Election, 2019: Oi Kwan
Party	Candidate	Votes	%	±%
Independent	Law Wai-shan	2,363	57.45	
DAB	Mun Ka-chun	1,750	42.55	−17.35
Majority		613	14.90	
Turnout		4,121	66.68	
Independent gain from DAB		Swing		

Wan Chai District Council Election, 2015: Oi Kwan
Party	Candidate	Votes	%	±%
DAB	Anna Tang King-yung	1,367	59.9	–8.1
Nonpartisan	Wong Sui-lung	915	40.1	
Majority		452	19.8	–16.2
Turnout		2,327	38.9	
DAB hold		Swing		

Wan Chai District Council Election, 2011: Oi Kwan
Party	Candidate	Votes	%	±%
DAB	Anna Tang King-yung	1,552	68.0	–7.4
Democratic	Mark Li Kin-yin	730	32.0	
Majority		822	36.0	–14.8
DAB hold		Swing	N/A	

=== 2000s ===
Wan Chai District Council Election, 2007: Oi Kwan
Party	Candidate	Votes	%	±%
DAB	Anna Tang King-yung	1,391	75.4	+21.4
Nonpartisan	Leung Yuk-yin	454	24.6	
Majority		937	50.8	+39.4
DAB hold		Swing	N/A	

Wan Chai District Council Election, 2003: Oi Kwan
Party	Candidate	Votes	%	±%
DAB	Anna Tang King-yung	1,248	54.0	
Civic Act-up	Ho Wing-yin	985	42.6	
Rights Party	Imran Rabbi	79	3.4	
Majority		263	11.4	N/A
DAB hold		Swing	N/A	

=== 1990s ===
Wan Chai District Council Election, 1999: Oi Kwan
Party	Candidate	Votes	%	±%
DAB	Anna Tang King-yung	uncontested		
DAB hold		Swing	N/A	

Wan Chai District Board Election, 1994: Oi Kwan
Party	Candidate	Votes	%	±%
DAB	Anna Tang King-yung	uncontested		
DAB win (new seat)				
