= Hennessy (constituency) =

Electoral division in Hong Kong

- Former Elected constituency for the Wan Chai District Council
- Boundary of Hennessy in Wan Chai District
- District: Wan Chai
- Legislative Council constituency: Hong Kong Island East
- Population: 12,777 (2019)
- Electorate: 5,023 (2019)

Former constituency
- Created: 1994
- Abolished: 2023
- Number of members: One

Hennessy was one of the 13 constituencies in the Wan Chai District of Hong Kong.

It returned one member of the district council until it was abolished the 2023 electoral reforms.

Hennessy constituency was loosely based on the Hennessy Road in the Wan Chai area in Hong Kong Island with estimated population of 12,777.

== Councillors represented ==
Election	Member	Party	%
1994	San Stephen Wong Hon-ching	Independent	63.49
1999	San Stephen Wong Hon-ching	CRA	N/A
2003	Cheng Ki-kin	Civic Act-up	60.35
2007	Cheng Ki-kin	Independent	77.74
2011	Cheng Ki-kin	Independent	89.68
2015	Cheng Ki-kin	Independent	67.66
2019	Sabina Koo Kwok-wai	Independent	42.23

== Election results ==
=== 2010s ===
Wan Chai District Council Election, 2019: Hennessy
Party	Candidate	Votes	%	±%
Independent	Sabina Koo Kwok-wa	1,373	42.23	
Independent	Wong Sau-tung	1,033	31.77	
Independent	Ha Hei-lok	845	25.99	
Majority		340	10.46	
Turnout		3,260	64.93	
Independent gain from Nonpartisan		Swing		

Wan Chai District Council Election, 2015: Hennessy
Party	Candidate	Votes	%	±%
Nonpartisan	Cheng Ki-kin	1,590	67.7	–22.0
Independent	Cheong Man-lei	760	32.3	
Majority		830	45.4	–34.0
Turnout		2,375	48.1	
Independent hold		Swing		

Wan Chai District Council Election, 2011: Hennessy
Party	Candidate	Votes	%	±%
Independent	Cheng Ki-kin	1,625	89.7	+12.0
Nonpartisan	Catherine Wong Kit-ning	187	10.3	−6.3
Majority		1,438	79.4	+71.2
Independent hold		Swing		

=== 2000s ===
Wan Chai District Council Election, 2007: Hennessy
Party	Candidate	Votes	%	±%
Nonpartisan	Cheng Ki-kin	1,463	77.7	+17.4
Liberal	Eddie Suen Wai-hon	264	14.0	
Nonpartisan	Andrew Wong Fai-hung	155	8.2	
Independent hold		Swing		

Wan Chai District Council Election, 2003: Hennessy
Party	Candidate	Votes	%	±%
Civic Act-up	Cheng Ki-kin	1,064	60.4	
DAB	Lee Yuen-kwong	699	39.6	–
Civic Act-up gain from CRA		Swing		

=== 1990s ===
Wan Chai District Council Election, 1999: Hennessy
Party	Candidate	Votes	%	±%
CRA	San Stephen Wong Hon-ching	uncontested		
CRA hold		Swing		

Wan Chai District Council Election, 1994: Hennessy
Party	Candidate	Votes	%	±%
Independent	San Stephen Wong Hon-ching	1,071	63.1	
Democratic	Cheng Chin-cheung	616	36.3	
Independent win (new seat)				
