= Tai Fat Hau (constituency) =

- Former Elected constituency for the Wan Chai District Council
- Boundary of Tai Fat Hau in Wan Chai District
- District: Wan Chai
- Legislative Council constituency: Hong Kong Island East
- Population: 13,170 (2019)
- Electorate: 4,983 (2019)

Former constituency
- Created: 1994
- Abolished: 2023
- Number of members: One

Tai Fat Hau (Chinese: 大佛口) is a former constituency in the Wan Chai District of Hong Kong. It returned one member of the district council until it was abolished the 2023 electoral reforms.

The constituency loosely covers Wan Chai in Hong Kong Island with the estimated population of 13,170.

== Councillors represented ==
Election	Member	Party	%
1994	Lo Tin-sown	DAB	54.25
1999	Lo Tin-sown	DAB	70.25
2003	Lo Kin-ming	WCCU	53.15
2007	Kenny Lee Kwun-yee	DAB	47.38
2011	Kenny Lee Kwun-yee	DAB	74.32
2015	Kenny Lee Kwun-yee	DAB	65.49
2019	Leung Pak-kin→Vacant (Note: Disqualified on 15 September 2021 after his oath was invalid.)	Nonpartisan	51.46

== Election results ==
=== 2010s ===
Wan Chai District Council Election, 2019: Tai Fat Hau
Party	Candidate	Votes	%	±%
Nonpartisan	Leung Pak-kin	1,723	51.46	+16.96
DAB	Kenny Lee Kwun-yee	1,625	48.54	−16.96
Majority		98	1.92	
Turnout		3,359	67.42	
Nonpartisan gain from DAB		Swing		

Wan Chai District Council Election, 2015: Tai Fat Hau
Party	Candidate	Votes	%	±%
DAB	Kenny Lee Kwun-yee	1,505	65.5	–8.8
Nonpartisan	Leung Pak-kin	793	34.5	
Majority		712	31.0	–17.6
Turnout		2,320	46.3	
DAB hold		Swing		

Wan Chai District Council Election, 2011: Tai Fat Hau
Party	Candidate	Votes	%	±%
DAB	Kenny Lee Kwun-yee	1,765	74.3	+26.9
PfD	Lo Kin-ming	610	25.7	–10.9
Majority		1,155	48.6	+28.1
DAB hold		Swing	+18.9	

=== 2000s ===
Wan Chai District Council Election, 2007: Tai Fat Hau
Party	Candidate	Votes	%	±%
DAB	Kenny Lee Kwun-yee	1,222	47.4	+0.6
Nonpartisan	Lo Kin-ming	943	36.6	–16.6
Civic Act-up	Ivy Chan Siu-ping	414	16.1	
Majority		279	20.5	+14.1
DAB gain from Nonpartisan		Swing		

Wan Chai District Council Election, 2003: Tai Fat Hau
Party	Candidate	Votes	%	±%
WCCU	Lo Kin-ming	1,189	53.2	
DAB	Lo Tin-sown	1,048	46.8	–22.9
Majority		141	6.4	N/A
Nonpartisan gain from DAB		Swing	N/A	

=== 1990s ===
Wan Chai District Council Election, 1999: Tai Fat Hau
Party	Candidate	Votes	%	±%
DAB	Lo Tin-sown	1,275	69.7	+15.8
Democratic	Terence So Kai-kuen	540	29.5	–10.0
Majority		735	40.2	+25.8
DAB hold		Swing	+12.9	

Wan Chai District Board Election, 1994: Tai Fat Hau
Party	Candidate	Votes	%	±%
DAB	Lo Tin-sown	1,021	53.9	
Democratic	Raymond Chan Wing-hung	747	39.5	
Nonpartisan	Lai Siu-kwan	114	6.0	
Majority		274	14.4	N/A
Democratic win (new seat)				
