= Stubbs Road (constituency) =

- Former Elected constituency for the Wan Chai District Council
- Boundary of Stubbs Road in Wan Chai District
- District: Wan Chai
- Legislative Council constituency: Hong Kong Island East
- Population: 15,042 (2019)
- Electorate: 5,362 (2019)

Former constituency
- Created: 1994
- Abolished: 2023
- Number of members: One

Stubbs Road (Chinese: 司徒拔道) was a constituency in the Wan Chai District of Hong Kong. It returned one member of the district council until it was abolished the 2023 electoral reforms.

The constituency loosely covered Stubbs Road in Hong Kong Island with the estimated population of 15,042.

== Councillors represented ==
| Election | Member | Party | % |
|---|---|---|---|
| 1994 | Mark Li Kin-yin | Democratic | 43.47 |
| 1999 | Ronald Fung | Independent | 43.35 |
| 2003 | Wong Wang-tai | Independent | 69.66 |
| 2007 | Wong Wang-tai | Independent | 55.11 |
| 2011 | Wong Wang-tai | Independent | 67.09 |
| 2015 | Wong Wang-tai | Independent | 64.17 |
| 2019 | Wong Wang-tai | Independent | 54.43 |

== Election results ==
=== 2010s ===
Wan Chai District Council Election, 2019: Stubbs Road
| Party | Candidate | Votes | % | ±% |
|---|---|---|---|---|
| Independent | Wong Wang-tai | 1,908 | 54.43 | −9.77 |
| Independent | Frankie Chow Kam-kei | 1,591 | 45.47 | |
| Majority | | 317 | 8.96 | |
| Turnout | | 3,506 | 65.41 | |
| Nonpartisan hold | | Swing | | |

Wan Chai District Council Election, 2015: Stubbs Road
| Party | Candidate | Votes | % | ±% |
|---|---|---|---|---|
| Nonpartisan | Wong Wang-tai | 1,150 | 64.2 | –2.9 |
| Nonpartisan | Au Lai-chong | 642 | 35.8 | |
| Majority | | 508 | 28.4 | –5.8 |
| Turnout | | 1,804 | 35.5 | |
| Nonpartisan hold | | Swing | | |

Wan Chai District Council Election, 2011: Stubbs Road
| Party | Candidate | Votes | % | ±% |
|---|---|---|---|---|
| Nonpartisan | Wong Wang-tai | 1,068 | 67.1 | +12.0 |
| Civic | Ng Yin-keung | 524 | 32.9 | –12.0 |
| Majority | | 544 | 34.2 | +32.9 |
| Nonpartisan hold | | Swing | +12.0 | |

=== 2000s ===
Wan Chai District Council Election, 2007: Stubbs Road
| Party | Candidate | Votes | % | ±% |
|---|---|---|---|---|
| Nonpartisan | Wong Wang-tai | 696 | 55.11 | –14.55 |
| Civic | Paulus Johannes Zimmerman | 567 | 44.89 | |
| Majority | | 129 | 1.29 | –38.03 |
| Nonpartisan hold | | Swing | N/A | |

Wan Chai District Council Election, 2003: Stubbs Road
| Party | Candidate | Votes | % | ±% |
|---|---|---|---|---|
| Nonpartisan | Wong Wang-tai | 776 | 69.66 | |
| DAB | Cheung Kwok-kwan | 338 | 30.34 | |
| Majority | | 438 | 39.32 | N/A |
| Nonpartisan gain from Nonpartisan | | Swing | N/A | |

=== 1990s ===
Wan Chai District Council Election, 1999: Stubbs Road
| Party | Candidate | Votes | % | ±% |
|---|---|---|---|---|
| Nonpartisan | Ronald Fung | 766 | 43.35 | |
| Liberal | Selina Chow Liang Shuk-yee | 683 | 38.65 | +4.75 |
| Democratic | Mark Li Kin-yin | 318 | 17.80 | –25.67 |
| Majority | | 83 | 4.70 | N/A |
| Nonpartisan hold | | Swing | N/A | |

Wan Chai District Board Election, 1994: Stubbs Road
| Party | Candidate | Votes | % | ±% |
|---|---|---|---|---|
| Democratic | Mark Li Kin-yin | 609 | 43.47 | |
| Liberal | Mark Lin Man-kit | 475 | 33.90 | |
| DAB | Ho Yuk-wing | 317 | 22.63 | |
| Majority | | 134 | 9.56 | N/A |
| Democratic win (new seat) | | | | |
