= Canal Road (constituency) =

Constituency in the Wan Chai District of Hong Kong

- Former Elected constituency for the Wan Chai District Council
- Boundary of Canal Road in Wan Chai District
- District: Wan Chai
- Legislative Council constituency: Hong Kong Island East
- Population: 12,512 (2019)
- Electorate: 5,011 (2019)

Former constituency
- Created: 1994
- Abolished: 2023

Canal Road (Chinese: 鵝頸) was one of the 13 constituencies in the Wan Chai District of Hong Kong. It returned one member of the district council until it was abolished the 2023 electoral reforms.

The constituency loosely covered Canal Road in Hong Kong Island with the estimated population of 12,512.

== Councillors represented ==
Election	Member	Party	%
1994	Suen Sai-cheong	DAB	54.19
1999	Suen Sai-cheong	DAB	N/A
2003	Lee Kai-hung	Nonpartisan	53.99
2007	Lee Kai-hung	Nonpartisan	53.92
2009 by-election	Jacqueline Chung Ka-man	DAB	66.11
2011	Jacqueline Chung Ka-man	DAB	N/A
2015	Jacqueline Chung Ka-man	DAB	58.47
2019	Mak King-sing→Vacant (Note: Resigned on 10 July 2021.)	Independent	57.76

== Election results ==
=== 2010s ===
Wan Chai District Council Election, 2019: Canal Road
Party	Candidate	Votes	%	±%
Independent	Mak King-sing	1,891	57.76	
DAB	Jacqueline Chung Ka-man	1,383	42.24	−16.26
Majority		508	15.52	
Turnout		3,279	65.46	
Independent gain from DAB		Swing		

Wan Chai District Council Election, 2015: Canal Road
Party	Candidate	Votes	%	±%
DAB	Jacqueline Chung Ka-man	1,018	58.5	
Nonpartisan	Gloria Ho Wing-ka	723	41.5	
Majority		295	17.0	
Turnout		1,755	35.3	
DAB hold		Swing		

Wan Chai District Council Election, 2011: Canal Road
Party	Candidate	Votes	%	±%
DAB	Jacqueline Chung Ka-man	uncontested		
DAB hold		Swing		

=== 2000s ===
Canal Road by-election 2009
Party	Candidate	Votes	%	±%
DAB	Jacqueline Chung Ka-man	1,061	65.7	
LSD	Kwai Sze-kit	544	33.7	
Majority		517	32.0	
DAB gain from Nonpartisan		Swing	N/A	

Wan Chai District Council Election, 2007: Canal Road
Party	Candidate	Votes	%	±%
Nonpartisan	Lee Kai-hung	1,039	53.9	
DAB	Jacqueline Chung Ka-man	888	46.1	
Majority		151	7.8	
Nonpartisan hold		Swing	N/A	

Wan Chai District Council Election, 2003: Canal Road
Party	Candidate	Votes	%	±%
Nonpartisan	Lee Kai-hung	1,117	54.0	
DAB	Suen Kai-cheong	952	46.0	
Majority		165	8.0	N/A
Nonpartisan gain from DAB		Swing	N/A	

=== 1990s ===
Wan Chai District Council Election, 1999: Canal Road
Party	Candidate	Votes	%	±%
DAB	Suen Kai-cheong	uncontested		
DAB hold		Swing	N/A	

Wan Chai District Board Election, 1994: Canal Road
Party	Candidate	Votes	%	±%
DAB	Suen Sai-cheong	809	53.2	
Democratic	Tang Ping	684	45.8	
Majority		125	7.4	
DAB win (new seat)				
