= Michael Mak (politician) =

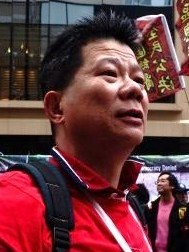
Mr. Michael Mak

Michael Mak Kwok-fung (simplified Chinese: 麦国风; traditional Chinese: 麥國風) (born 23 August 1955 in Hong Kong) is a Hong Kong politician. He is an elected representative of the Wan Chai District. He was the founding deputy chairman of the League of Social Democrats, and was elected to the Advisory Council of the party in 2010. He is a registered mental nurse, was elected into the Legislative Council of Hong Kong from 2000 to 2004 through the health services functional constituency. He worked with Castle Peak Hospital and Prince of Wales Hospital, and retired from the post of Department Operations Manager at Kwai Chung Hospital in September 2015.

In 2008, Mak was denied entry to Macau to attend a meeting on nursing when the Olympic torch relay was being held in there.

Legislative Council of Hong Kong
Preceded by Michael Ho	Member of Legislative Council; Representative for Health Services; 2000–2004	Succeeded by Joseph Lee
Political offices
Preceded by Ada Wong	Member of Wan Chai District Council; Representative for Broadwood; 2008–2011	Succeeded by Pamela Peck
