= Causeway Bay (constituency) =

- Former Elected constituency for the Wan Chai District Council
- Boundary of Causeway Bay in Wan Chai District
- District: Wan Chai
- Legislative Council constituency: Hong Kong Island East
- Population: 12,777 (2019)
- Electorate: 5,805 (2019)

Former constituency
- Created: 1994
- Abolished: 2023
- Number of members: One

Causeway Bay was one of the 13 constituencies in the Wan Chai District.

It returned one member of the district council until it was abolished the 2023 electoral reforms.

Causeway Bay constituency was loosely based on Causeway Bay area with estimated population of 12,777.

== Councillors represented ==
Election	Member	Party	%
1994	John Tse Wing-ling	Democratic	91.52
1999	John Tse Wing-ling	Democratic	46.00
2003	John Tse Wing-ling	Democratic→Independent	54.99
2007	Yolanda Ng Yuen-ting	Independent	54.05
2011	Yolanda Ng Yuen-ting	Independent	75.04
2015	Yolanda Ng Yuen-ting	Independent	N/A
2019	Cathy Yau Man-shan→Vacant (Note: Resigned on 9 July 2021.)	Independent	54.96

== Election results ==
=== 2010s ===
Wan Chai District Council Election, 2019: Causeway Bay
Party	Candidate	Votes	%	±%
Independent	Cathy Yau Man-shan	1,918	54.96	
Independent	Yolanda Ng Yuen-ting	1,572	45.04	
Majority		346	9.92	
Turnout		3,502	60.33	
Independent gain from Independent		Swing		

Wan Chai District Council Election, 2015: Causeway Bay
Party	Candidate	Votes	%	±%
Independent	Yolanda Ng Yuen-ting	Uncontested		
Independent hold		Swing		

Wan Chai District Council Election, 2011: Causeway Bay
Party	Candidate	Votes	%	±%
Independent	Yolanda Ng Yuen-ting	1,350	75.0	+20.9
Democratic	Fong Yik-lam	369	20.5	
People Power	Kong Kwok-chu	80	4.4	
Majority		981	54.5	+8.2
Independent hold		Swing		

=== 2000s ===
Wan Chai District Council Election, 2007: Causeway Bay
Party	Candidate	Votes	%	±%
Independent	Yolanda Ng Yuen-ting	834	54.1	
Independent	John Tse Wing-ling	709	45.9	−9.1
Independent gain from Independent		Swing		

Wan Chai District Council Election, 2003: Causeway Bay
Party	Candidate	Votes	%	±%
Democratic	John Tse Wing-ling	1,190	55.0	
DAB	Kenny Lee Kwun-yee	974	45.0	
Democratic hold		Swing		

=== 1990s ===
Wan Chai District Council Election, 1999: Causeway Bay
Party	Candidate	Votes	%	±%
Democratic	John Tse Wing-ling	783	45.6	
DAB	Kenny Lee Kwun-yee	630	36.7	
Liberal	Simon Lee Chao-fu	289	16.8	
Democratic hold		Swing		

Wan Chai District Council Election, 1994: Causeway Bay
Party	Candidate	Votes	%	±%
Democratic	John Tse Wing-ling	1,101	58.9	
Independent	Stephen Liu Wing-ting	102	5.3	
Democratic win (new seat)				
