= Tai Hang (constituency) =

- Former Elected constituency for the Wan Chai District Council
- Boundary of Tai Hang in Wan Chai District
- District: Wan Chai
- Legislative Council constituency: Hong Kong Island East
- Population: 13,701 (2019)
- Electorate: 5,319 (2019)

Former constituency
- Created: 1994
- Abolished: 2023
- Number of members: One

Tai Hang was one of the 13 constituencies in the Wan Chai District.

It returned one member of the district council until it was abolished the 2023 electoral reforms.

Tai Hang constituency was loosely based on the Tai Hang area in Hong Kong Island with estimated population of 13,701.

== Councillors represented ==
Election	Member	Party	%
1994	Bonson Lee Hing-wai	Democratic	58.90
1999	Bonson Lee Hing-wai	Democratic	52.26
2003	Bonson Lee Hing-wai	Democratic	63.85
2007	Wong Chor-fung	Independent→NPP	52.79
2011	Wong Chor-fung	NPP	52.42
2015	Clarisse Yeung Suet-ying→Vacant (Note: Disqualified on 15 September 2021 after her oath was invalid due to her involvement in pro-democracy primaries.)	Independent	54.91
2019	Clarisse Yeung Suet-ying→Vacant	Independent	62.02

== Election results ==
=== 2010s ===
Wan Chai District Council Election, 2019: Tai Hang
Party	Candidate	Votes	%	±%
Independent	Clarisse Yeung Suet-ying	2,340	62.02	+7.12
Independent	Liu Tin-shing	1,433	37.98	
Majority		907	24.14	+14.20
Turnout		3,785	71.16	
Independent hold		Swing		

Wan Chai District Council Election, 2015: Tai Hang
Party	Candidate	Votes	%	±%
Independent	Clarisse Yeung Suet-ying	1,398	54.9	
NPP	Gigi Wong Ching-chi	1,148	45.1	–7.3
Majority		250	9.8	–1.7
Turnout		2,566	45.1	
Independent gain from NPP		Swing		

Wan Chai District Council Election, 2011: Tai Hang
Party	Candidate	Votes	%	±%
NPP	Wong Chor-fung	1,266	52.4	–0.4
Democratic	Sin Chung-kai	965	40.9	–6.3
People Power (Power Voters)	Christopher Lau Gar-hung	141	5.8	
Independent	Richard Shum See-hoi	43	1.8	
Majority		301	11.5	+5.9
NPP hold		Swing		

=== 2000s ===
Wan Chai District Council Election, 2007: Tai Hang
Party	Candidate	Votes	%	±%
Independent	Wong Chor-fung	1,059	52.8	
Democratic	Bonson Lee Hing-wai	947	47.2	−16.7
Independent gain from Democratic		Swing		

Wan Chai District Council Election, 2003: Tai Hang
Party	Candidate	Votes	%	±%
Democratic	Bonson Lee Hing-wai	1,466	63.9	+12.1
DAB	Yuen Chun-chuen	830	36.1	−11.2
Democratic hold		Swing		

=== 1990s ===
Wan Chai District Council Election, 1999: Tai Hang
Party	Candidate	Votes	%	±%
Democratic	Bonson Lee Hing-wai	877	51.8	−7.1
DAB	Yuen Chun-chuen	801	47.3	+6.2
Democratic hold		Swing		

Wan Chai District Board Election, 1994: Tai Hang
Party	Candidate	Votes	%	±%
Democratic	Bonson Lee Hing-wai	1,032	58.9	
DAB	Chan Tak-ming	720	41.1	
Majority		312	17.8	
Democratic win (new seat)				
