= Hong Kong Chinese Reform Association =

Political organisation in Hong Kong

Hong Kong Chinese Reform Association 香港華人革新協會
- President: Lee Chi-keung
- Chairman: Lai Wai-kuen
- Founder: Wong San-yin, among others
- Founded: 8 May 1949
- Ideology: Chinese nationalism; Liberalism (formerly)
- Regional affiliation: Pro-Beijing camp

Website
- www.hkcra.com

Hong Kong Chinese Reform Association
- Traditional Chinese: 香港華人革新協會
- Simplified Chinese: 香港华人革新协会
Transcriptions
Standard Mandarin
- Hanyu Pinyin: Xiānggǎng Huárén Géxīn Xiéhuì
Yue: Cantonese
- Yale Romanization: Hēunggóng Wàhyàhn Gaaksān Hipwuih
- Jyutping: Hoeng^{1}gong^{2} Waa^{4}jan^{4} Gaak^{3}san^{1} Hip^{3}wui^{6}

The Hong Kong Chinese Reform Association (Chinese: 香港華人革新協會) is a pro-Beijing political organisation established in 1949 in Hong Kong. It was one of the three pillars of the pro-Communist leftist camp throughout most of the time in Hong Kong under colonial rule (the others two being the Hong Kong Federation of Trade Unions and Chinese General Chamber of Commerce).

== History ==
=== Founding ===
It was first founded in May 1949 by a group of Chinese professionals and intellectuals in response to the then Governor Mark Aitchison Young's plan of constitutional reform. The founding members included barristers Mok Ying-kwai and Percy Chen, Chan Kwan-po, senior lecturer in the Department of Chinese of the University of Hong Kong, Wong San-yin, formerly a leactuer in pharmacology in the University of Hong Kong and doctor Wu Tat-biu. Wong San-yin was elected the association's founding chairman. Wong San-yin was appointed to the Chinese People's Political Consultative Conference (CPPCC) after the People's Republic of China was founded in October 1949.

The association was seen as a counterblast to the Reform Club of Hong Kong, which was founded in around the same time during the debate on the Young Plan and composed of mostly expatriate elite in Hong Kong. The colonial government had kept a watchful eye on the association. Young's successor, Alexander Grantham marked that the association "naturally attracted several political adventurers, notably Moscow-trained Percy Chen." Grantham also predicted that the Communists might try to get control of the association in the future.

=== The Young Plan and early years (1949–1952) ===
The association demanded that all unofficial members of the proposed municipal council should be elected and the appointment system should be dropped. In a meeting on 13 July 1949 attended by about 400 delegates from 142 registered Chinese civic organisations, the association and the Chinese Manufacturers' Association of Hong Kong and also two Kowloon-based commercial bodies culminated signatures of 142 organisations which presented membership of 141,800 people from the business, industry, labour and education sectors in the Chinese community.

During 1950–1951 the association had moved leftward towards the newly established Communist government in Beijing with Mok Ying-kwai and Percy Chen emerging as its strongest leaders. After the constitutional reform was turned down by the London and Hong Kong governments in 1952, Percy Chen contested for the two resumed elected seats in the 1952 Urban Council election but failed to win a seat. In September 1952, the chairman of the association Mok Ying-kwai was deported. It was said that Mok's deportation was because of his record as a local champion of communist causes. Percy Chen subsequently sought help from the Hong Kong Chinese Clerks Association in reorganising the association. Choi Wai-hang of the Clerks Association joined the Reform Association at the end of 1952 which he later became one of the leaders of the association.

=== 1950s to 1980s ===
The association evolved into a pressure group following the abandonment of the Young Plan, such as opposed to the increase of electricity tariff. It was one of the three pillars of the pro-Beijing leftist segment, the other two being the Hong Kong and Kowloon Federation of Trade Unions and Chinese General Chamber of Commerce. It was one of the few organisations to hoist five-star flags on the National Day of the People's Republic of China. Mok Ying-kwai was also chairman of the first Preparatory Committee for the National Day Celebration. The association and the Federation of Trade Unions were responsible for disturbing the relief and the Communist government sent medicine and rice to Hong Kong during the natural disaster in 1950s.

Choi Wai-hang was arrested during the 1967 Leftist riots and was imprisoned to the Victoria Road Detention Centre (or the Mount Davis Concentration Camp) for about 18 months. Choi became the association chairman in the mid-1980s and remained as association leader until 1999.

=== Transition period (1980s–1997) ===
During the Sino-British negotiation on the Hong Kong sovereignty in the 1980s, the association sent a delegate to Beijing to visit Ji Pengfei, Li Hou and Lu Ping, heads of the Hong Kong and Macao Affairs Office in December 1983. Percy Chen was also invited to witness the signature of the Sino-British Joint Declaration in December 1984.

The association participated in the 1991 District Board elections and its member Anna Tang King-yung won one seat in the Wan Chai District Board. In July 1994, the association co-founded the pro-Beijing business oriented Hong Kong Progressive Alliance (HKPA) in the direction of the New China News Agency in preparation for the 1995 Legislative Council Election. In the 1995 Urban Council election, its member San Stephen Wong Hon-ching won a seat. However, in the 1996 election, Wong failed to get elected to the Provisional Legislative Council, an interim legislature controlled by Beijing during the transition of sovereignty.

=== Since handover (1997–present) ===
The association helped the pro-Beijing parties such as the Democratic Alliance for the Betterment of Hong Kong (DAB) in the first District Council elections in 1999 after the handover, Wong Hon-ching was also able to win a seat for the association in the Hennessy constituency in the Wan Chai District Council. It had also participated in the elections for the 11th National People's Congress, filling four candidates in 2007.
