= John Tse =

- 謝永齡
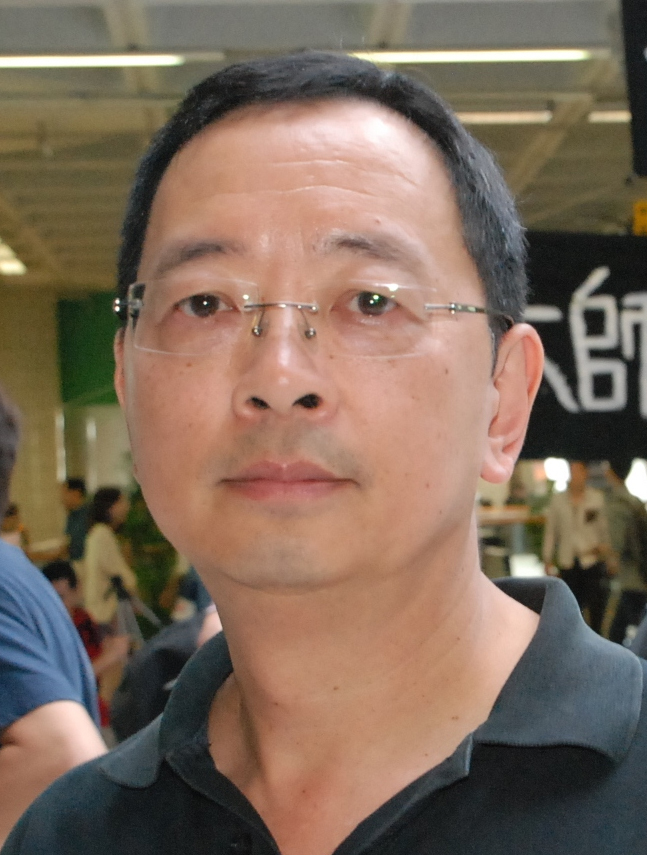
- Tse in 2006

Member of the Legislative Council
- In office 11 October 1995 – 30 June 1997
- Succeeded by: Parliament abolished
- Constituency: Election Committee

Personal details
- Born: 1954 (age 71–72) Hong Kong
- Party: Democratic Party (1994–2007)
- Education: MA (Lakehead); BEd (St. Mary's U); MEd (Alberta); PhD (Nottingham); FRSA

John Tse Wing-ling (born 1954) is an associate professor in the Department of Applied Social Sciences, City University of Hong Kong .

He was the member of the Wan Chai District Council (1994–2007) representing Causeway Bay and elected as vice-chairman from 2004 to 2007. He was the also member of Legislative Council (1995–97) representing for Election Committee. He became the executive director of Hong Kong Unison in 2022, until he was fired when the organisation dissolved in 2025.

Legislative Council of Hong Kong
New constituency	Member of Legislative Council; Representative for Election Committee; 1995–1997; Served alongside: Lo Suk-ching, Choy Kan-pui, Anthony Cheung, Ambrose Lau, Ip Kwok-him, David Chu, Chan Kam-lam, Law Cheung-kwok, Yum Sin-ling	Replaced by Provisional Legislative Council
