= Happy Valley (constituency) =

Constituency of the Wan Chai District Council of Hong Kong

- Former Elected constituency for the Wan Chai District Council
- Boundary of Happy Valley in Wan Chai District
- District: Wan Chai
- Legislative Council constituency: Hong Kong Island East
- Population: 13,150 (2019)
- Electorate: 5,638 (2019)

Former constituency
- Created: 1982
- Abolished: 2023
- Number of members: One

Happy Valley (Chinese: 跑馬地) was one of the 13 constituencies in the Wan Chai District of Hong Kong which was created in 1982. It returned one member of the district council until it was abolished the 2023 electoral reforms.

The constituency loosely covered Happy Valley in Hong Kong Island with the estimated population of 13,150.

== Councillors represented ==
=== 1982 to 1985 ===
Election	Member	Party
1982	Albert Cheung Chi-piu	Nonpartisan

=== 1985 to 1994 ===
Election	First Member	First Party	Second Member	Second Party
1985	Lester Kwok Chi-hang	Nonpartisan	Albert Cheung Chi-piu	Nonpartisan
1988	Lee Yiu-kwong	Civic Association	Albert Cheung Chi-piu	HKAS
1988	Stephen Ng Kam-chun	Civic Association	Albert Cheung Chi-piu	Nonpartisan

=== 1994 to present ===
Election	Member	Party	%
1994	Stephen Ng Kam-chun	LDF→Progressive Alliance	46.45
1999	Stephen Ng Kam-chun	Progressive Alliance→Independent	83.07
2003	Stephen Ng Kam-chun	Independent	55.50
2007	Stephen Ng Kam-chun	Independent	67.86
2011	Stephen Ng Kam-chun	Independent	65.53
2015	Stephen Ng Kam-chun	Independent	60.47
2019	Clara Cheung→Vacant (Note: Resigned on 8 July 2021.)	Independent	49.27

== Election results ==
=== 2010s ===
Wan Chai District Council Election, 2019: Happy Valley
Party	Candidate	Votes	%	±%
Nonpartisan	Clara Cheung	1,954	49.27	
Nonpartisan	Sam Ng Chak-sum	1,805	45.51	−14.99
2047 HK Monitor	Vivian Chan Wing-ha	207	5.22	
Majority		149	3.76	
Turnout		3,979	70.59	
Nonpartisan gain from Nonpartisan		Swing		

Wan Chai District Council Election, 2015: Happy Valley
Party	Candidate	Votes	%	±%
Independent	Stephen Ng Kam-chun	1,377	60.5	+5.0
Nonpartisan	Kelvin Chien Ka-wo	900	39.5	
Majority		477	21.0	–10.0
Turnout		2,309	43.2	
Independent hold		Swing		

Wan Chai District Council Election, 2011: Happy Valley
Party	Candidate	Votes	%	±%
Independent	Stephen Ng Kam-chun	1,422	65.5	+1.0
Civic	Tsang Kin-chiu	748	34.5	–1.0
Majority		673	31.0	+2.0
Independent hold		Swing	+1.0	

=== 2000s ===
Wan Chai District Council Election, 2007: Happy Valley
Party	Candidate	Votes	%	±%
Nonpartisan	Stephen Ng Kam-chun	1,309	64.5	+9.0
Civic	Anthony Lam Yue-yeung	620	35.5	
Majority		689	29.0	+18.0
Nonpartisan hold		Swing	N/A	

Wan Chai District Council Election, 2003: Happy Valley
Party	Candidate	Votes	%	±%
Nonpartisan	Stephen Ng Kam-chun	1,236	55.5	–27.1
Civic Act-up	Jo Lee Wai-yee	991	44.5	
Majority		245	11.0	–54.8
Nonpartisan hold		Swing	N/A	

=== 1990s ===
Wan Chai District Council Election, 1999: Happy Valley
Party	Candidate	Votes	%	±%
HKPA	Stephen Ng Kam-chun	1,398	82.6	+24.4
Democratic	Tang Ping	285	16.8	
Majority		1,113	65.8	+63.5
HKPA hold		Swing	N/A	

Wan Chai District Board Election, 1994: Happy Valley
Party	Candidate	Votes	%	±%
LDF	Stephen Ng Kam-chun	817	45.8	–12.4
Nonpartisan	Yu Kwok-tung	776	43.5	
Liberal	Pong Ho-wing	166	9.3	
Majority		41	2.3	
LDF hold		Swing		

Wan Chai District Board Election, 1991: Happy Valley
Party	Candidate	Votes	%	±%
Civic	Stephen Ng Kam-chun	1,500	58.2	
Nonpartisan	Albert Cheung Chi-piu	1,219	47.3	–2.6
Nonpartisan	Helen Chung Yee-fong	1,111	43.1	
Civic gain from Nonpartisan		Swing		
Nonpartisan hold		Swing		

=== 1980s ===
Wan Chai District Board Election, 1988: Happy Valley
Party	Candidate	Votes	%	±%
Civic	Lee Yiu-kwong	1,738	64.3	
HKAS	Albert Cheung Chi-piu	1,350	49.9	+14.4
Civic	Ho Yuk-wing	1,002	37.0	+14.3
Civic gain from Nonpartisan		Swing		
HKAS hold		Swing		

Wan Chai District Board Election, 1985: Happy Valley
Party	Candidate	Votes	%	±%
Nonpartisan	Lester Kwok Chi-hang	2,926	75.5	
Nonpartisan	Albert Cheung Chi-piu	1,374	35.5	–15.2
Civic	Lee Man-ho	1,122	29.0	
Nonpartisan	Ho Yuk-wing	881	22.7	–25.4
Nonpartisan hold		Swing		
Nonpartisan win (new seat)				

Wan Chai District Board Election, 1982: Happy Valley
Party	Candidate	Votes	%	±%
Nonpartisan	Albert Cheung Chi-piu	929	50.7	
Nonpartisan	Ho Yuk-wing	881	48.1	
Majority		48	2.6	
Nonpartisan win (new seat)				
