= Peggy Lam =

Hong Kong politician (born 1928)

Peggy Lam Pei Yu-dja GBS, OBE, JP
- Born: 2 May 1928 (age 98); Suzhou, Jiangsu province, Republic of China
- Education: University of Shanghai; University of Chicago; University of Michigan
- Spouse: Gilbert Lam Kwong-kui
- Children: Vivian Lam Wai-wai
- Parent(s): Pei Tse-Ziang; Chan Chee-yin

Peggy Lam Pei Yu-dja, GBS, OBE (Chinese: 林貝聿嘉; born 1928) is a Beijing loyalist politician in Hong Kong. She is the chief executive officer of the Family Planning Association of Hong Kong.

== Family ==
She graduated from the University of Shanghai with a Bachelor of Arts. She received a certificate in family planning from the University of Chicago and a certificate in Public Health Administration from the University of Michigan.

Lam is the second youngest cousin of architect, I. M. Pei.

== Politics ==
She was a member of the Preparatory Committee for the Hong Kong Special Administrative Region. She was also a member of Legislative Council and the Chinese People’s Political Consultative Conference, and Chairman of the Wan Chai District Council.

In 2000, Lam was the chairperson of the Hong Kong Federation of Women, an organisation formed under the direction of Beijing to align pro-China forces.

== Honours ==
She was appointed as the Justice of the Peace in 1981. She later awarded the Member of the Order of the British Empire (MBE) in 1985, the Officer of the Order of the British Empire (OBE) in 1993. After the establishment of HKSAR, she was awarded the Silver Bauhinia Star (SBS) in 1998 and the Gold Bauhinia Star (GBS) in 2003.

Political offices
Preceded by Lam Kam-kwong	Chairman of the Wan Chai District Council; 1985–2003	Succeeded by Ada Wong Ying-kay
Order of precedence
Preceded by James Kung; Recipients of the Gold Bauhinia Star	Hong Kong order of precedence Recipients of the Gold Bauhinia Star	Succeeded by Alice Lam; Recipients of the Gold Bauhinia Star
