= Civic Act-up =

Civic Act-Up 公民起動
- Chairman: Cyd Ho
- Founded: 24 September 2003
- Ideology: Liberalism
- Regional affiliation: Pro-democracy camp
- Colours: Black, amber
- Legislative Council: 0 / 90
- District Council: 0 / 470

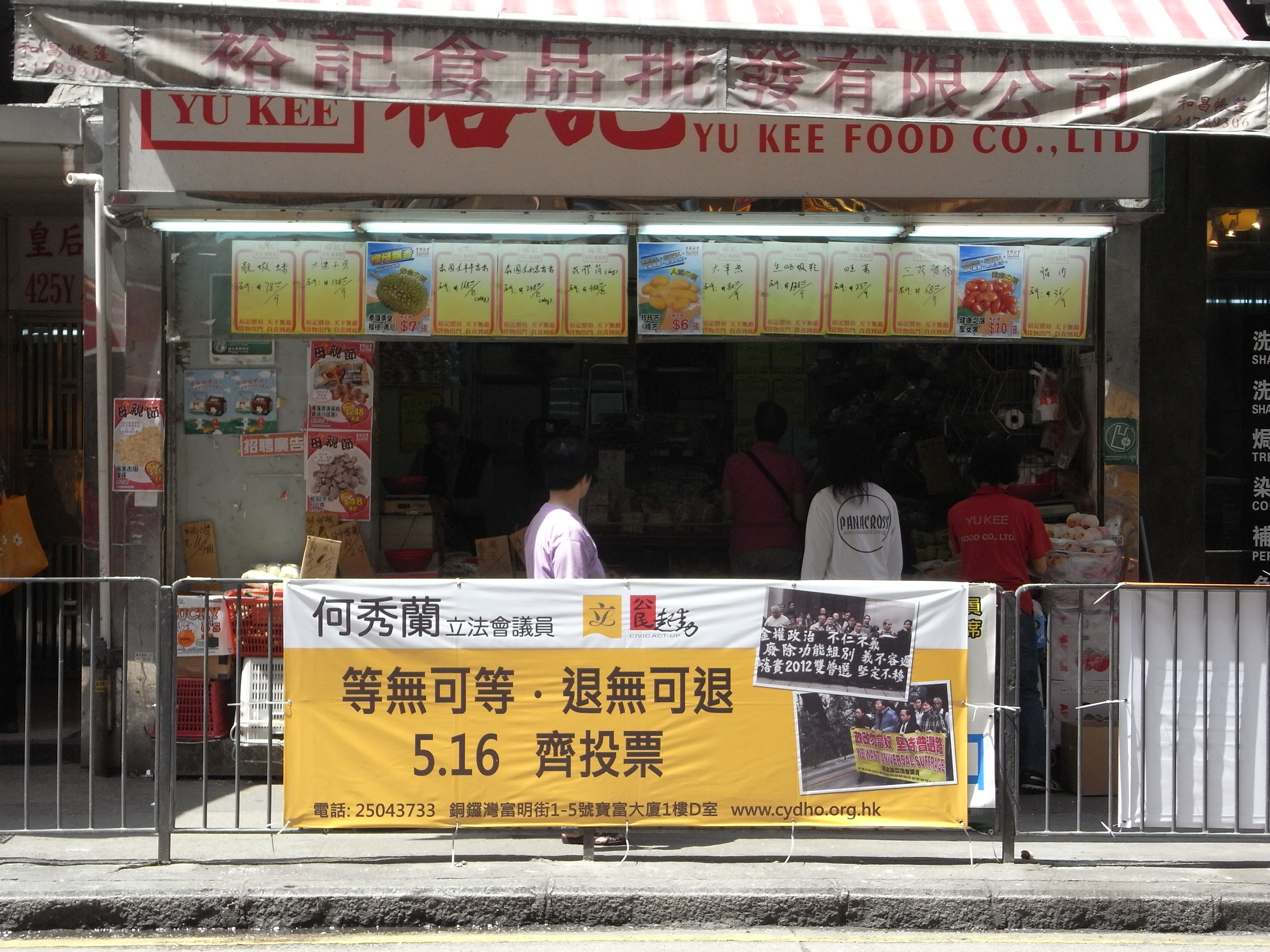
Banner of Civic Act-Up's Cyd Ho Sau-lan during the 2010 Hong Kong by-election.

Civic Act-up (Chinese: 公民起動) is a small pro-democracy political group in Hong Kong. It was founded on 24 September 2003 by a group of relatively young activists with the encouragement of Legislative Councillor Cyd Ho, to challenge the existing pro-government district councillors in Wanchai District in the 2003 District Council elections. There is no formal structure in the group.

== Beliefs ==
The platform of the group includes pressing for universal suffrage for the Chief Executive and Legislative Council, improvements in urban design and transportation, paying special attention to youth, women and ethnic minority issues, and extending anti-discrimination laws to the areas of age, sexual orientation and race.

== History ==
It was formed in the background of the 2003 July 1 march, where half of a million Hong Kong people showed up in the demonstration against the legislation of the Hong Kong Basic Law Article 23 and the Tung Chee-hwa administration. In the wake of the massive civil movement, Legislative Councillor Cyd Ho So-lan formed the Civic Act-up to contest in the Wanchai District in the 2003 District Council elections. Three out of five candidates of the group won in the 2003 District Council elections, with Cyd Ho defeated the pro-Beijing DAB's Legislative Councillor Ip Kwok-him in the Kwun Lung constituency in Central and Western District.

In 2004 LegCo elections, Cyd Ho, representing the Civic Act-up, lost her seat to DAB's Choy So-yuk with a narrow margin in Hong Kong Island due to tactical mistake of the ally Democratic Party. Cyd Ho revenged her defeat in the 2012 LegCo elections by winning in Hong Kong Island.

In 2012, Cyd Ho joined the Labour Party and ran under the Labour banner in the 2012 LegCo elections.

== Electoral performance ==
=== Legislative Council elections ===
Election	Number of popular votes	% of popular votes	GC seats	FC seats	Total seats	+/−
2004	Audrey Eu ticket		0	0	0 / 60	1▼
2008	30,887	2.04	1	0	1 / 60	1▲
2012	Labour ticket		1	0	1 / 70	0

=== District Council elections ===
Election	Number of popular votes	% of popular votes	Total elected seats	+/−
2003	5,170	0.49	3 / 400	3▲
2007	991▼	0.09▼	0 / 405	2▼
