= Hong Kong Island East (2021 constituency) =

Geographical constituency in Hong Kong

- Geographical constituency for the Legislative Council of Hong Kong
- Boundary of Hong Kong Island East in Hong Kong
- District: Eastern District; Wan Chai District
- Region: Hong Kong Island
- Population: 718,600
- Electorate: 379,926

Current constituency
- Created: 2021
- Number of members: Two
- Members: Ng Chau-pei (FTU); Elaine Chik (DAB)
- Created from: Hong Kong Island

The Hong Kong Island East geographical constituency is one of the ten geographical constituencies in the elections for the Legislative Council of Hong Kong which elects two members of the Legislative Council using the single non-transferable vote (SNTV) system. The constituency covers Eastern District and Wan Chai District on Hong Kong Island.

== History ==
The constituency was created under the overhaul of the electoral system imposed by the Beijing government in 2021, replacing Eastern District and Wan Chai District in the Hong Kong Island constituency used from 1998 to 2021. Constituencies with the same name were also created for the 1991 and 1995 elections in the late colonial period, while the 1991 constituency also elected two seats with each voter having two votes with the same boundary.

== Returning members ==
Election	Member	Party	Member	Party
2021	Ng Chau-pei	FTU	Edward Leung	DAB
2025	Ng Chau-pei	FTU	Elaine Chik	DAB

== Election results ==
=== 2020s ===
Vote share
1. FTU (33.9%)
2. DAB (32.9%)
3. Liberal (18.5%)
4. New People's Party (14.8%)

2025 Legislative Council election: Hong Kong Island East
Party	Candidate	Votes	%	±%
FTU	Ng Chau-pei	39,707	33.86	−16.18
DAB	Elaine Chik Kit-ling	22,054	18.81	
Liberal	Kenny Yuen Kin-chung	21,696	18.50	
NPP	Calvin Kwok Ho-king	17,344	14.79	−3.18
DAB	Lee Ching-har	16,458	14.04	
Total valid votes		117,259	100.00	
Rejected ballots		4,008		
Turnout		121,267	31.92	
Registered electors		379,926		
FTU hold		Swing		
DAB hold		Swing		

Vote share
1. FTU (50.0%)
2. DAB (20.8%)
3. New People's Party (18.0%)
4. Nonpartisan (11.2%)

2021 Legislative Council election: Hong Kong Island East
Party	Candidate	Votes	%	±%
FTU	Ng Chau-pei	64,509	50.04	
DAB	Edward Leung Hei	26,799	20.79	
NPP	Liu Tin-shing	23,171	17.97	
Nonpartisan	Jason Poon Chuk-hung	14,435	11.20	
Total valid votes		128,914	100.00	
Rejected ballots		2,914		
Turnout		131,828	31.03	
Registered electors		424,849		
FTU win (new seat)				
DAB win (new seat)				
