= 2023 Hong Kong electoral changes =

Changes to the composition of the District Councils: 2019 election (479 seats): Directly elected (452); Ex-officio (Chairmen of Rural Committee) (27); 2023 election (470 seats): Directly elected (88); Ex-officio (Chairmen of Rural Committee) (27); Indirectly elected (Electoral College of "Three Committees") (176); Appointed by the Chief Executive (179)

The 2023 Hong Kong electoral changes were proposed by the government of the Hong Kong Special Administrative Region (HKSAR) on 2 May 2023 in the 18 District Councils of Hong Kong for the December elections and were approved by the Legislative Council on 6 July 2023. The changes became officially effective on 10 July 2023. Previously returned by direct elections, the number of elected seats was significantly reduced to around 20 per cent, while about 40 per cent of the seats were filled through indirect elections and appointments by the Chief Executive.

Chief Executive John Lee stated that a vetting mechanism was introduced to prevent "anti-China troublemakers" and those promoting "separatism" and violence from "manipulating and paralysing" the councils, and to safeguard national security and implement the principle of "patriots running Hong Kong", following the landslide victory of the pro-democracy camp in the 2019 elections amid the massive anti-government protests.

== Legislation ==
District Councils (Amendment) Bill 2023

Legislative Council of Hong Kong
- Long title: An Ordinance to amend the District Councils Ordinance to revise the functions and composition of District Councils; to establish the District Council Eligibility Review Committee; to provide for the mechanism for sanctioning misconduct of members of District Councils; to provide for related matters; and to make minor technical amendments.
- Citation: Ordinance No. 19 of 2023
- Territorial extent: Hong Kong
- Enacted by: Legislative Council of Hong Kong
- Signed by: John Lee
- Signed: 7 July 2023
- Commenced: 10 July 2023

Legislative history
- Bill title: District Councils (Amendment) Bill 2023
- Introduced by: Secretary for Constitutional and Mainland Affairs Erick Tsang
- Introduced: 30 May 2023
- First reading: 31 May 2023
- Second reading: 5 July 2023
- Third reading: 6 July 2023

Amends
- District Councils Ordinance; Subsidiary Legislation under District Councils Ordinance
- Status: In force

In the summer of 2019, chief executive Carrie Lam pushing forward the controversial extradition bill triggered a series of major protests in the city which often turned into violent clashes between the police and protesters. In following November, the pro-democracy camp, out of Beijing and the Hong Kong government's expectation, won a landslide victory in the District Council elections which was viewed as a de facto referendum on the protests, by taking control of 17 out of the 18 councils and around 80 per cent of the seats.

In the democrat-controlled District Councils, motions in support of protesters, condemning police violence and grills of government officials including then Commission of Police Chris Tang took place, before the installation of the Hong Kong national security law by Beijing in June 2020 to criminalise "secession" from China and "subversion" of the state power and the passage of the Public Offices (Candidacy and Taking Up Offices) (Miscellaneous Amendments) Ordinance 2021 in May 2021 to imposes oath-taking requirements on District Council members.

Six months before the oath-taking bill passage, dozens of opposition District Councillors resigned for refusal to take an oath under the new law. More than 260 pro-democracy councillors resigned amid reports the government planned to ban them from take part of the oath, while eight other had been unseated as they were in custody or had left the city due to various cases including the violation of national security. Together with the 49 councillors whose oaths were ruled invalid, more than 70 per cent seats in the 18 District Councils were left vacant without by-election.

In May 2021, China's National People's Congress (NPC) initiated the amendment of electoral rules to "improve the electoral system" for its chief executive and the Legislative Council (LegCo). A much less open electoral system was introduced which resulted in the pro-Beijing camp winning 89 of the 90 seats in the December 2021 Legislative Council elections and the uncontested Chief Executive election in May 2022.

Sing Tao Daily reported in February 2023 that a major reform of the District Council elections will be implemented after director of the Hong Kong and Macao Affairs Office (HKMAO) Xia Baolong met with a Hong Kong delegation in Shenzhen. The number of directly elected seats will be significantly reduced to one-thirds, while the other two-thirds will be indirectly elected or appointed. The electoral method will also be changed from single-seat single-vote system to double-seat single-vote system.

On 2 May, chief executive John Lee announced the details of the reform plan to "depoliticise" the councils and redirect their focus to community-level livelihood issues, prevent those promoting separatism and violence from "manipulating and paralysing" the councils, and safeguard national security and ensure "patriots" running Hong Kong. He denied the revamp was a step backwards and said that it would make the groups more "representative" instead.

On 6 July, the Legislative Council approved and confirmed the electoral changes. On July 10, the final confirmed bills were published to Hong Kong Government Gazette, becoming effective.

== Content ==
On 2 May, chief executive John Lee announced the details of the plan for reforming the District Council electoral system which was guided by the principles of putting national security as the "topmost priority" and "faithfully implementing" the "one country, two systems", the principle of "patriots administering Hong Kong" and the principle of "executive-led governance":

- The District Council chairmanship will be taken up by District Officers, appointed government officials, replacing the current system which the chairman was elected by member among themselves;
- District Councils will be composed of appointed, District Committees Constituency (composed of members of "the three committees" of that district, namely the District Fight Crime Committees (DFCCs), the District Fire Safety Committees (DFSCs), the Area Committees (ACs)), District Council Geographical Constituency and the existing ex-officio members, with appointed, DCC and DCGC members will account for about 40% (179 seats), 40% (176 seats) and 20% (88 seats) respectively, plus 27 ex-officio members;
- A total of 88 seats in 44 DCGCs, where candidates should be nominated by three members of each of "the three committees" in the district and have to obtain the nominations of not less than 50 electors in the constituency;
- "Double Seats and Single Vote" system is to be adopted in the DCGC election where electors can vote for one candidate in their constituency by secret ballot, and the two candidates with the highest number of votes will be elected;
- The number of candidates to be elected by members of "the three committees" in the district by the "block vote" voting system and the "first past the post" voting system;
- All candidates must confirm their eligibility through an eligibility review mechanism under a "District Council Eligibility Review Committee" (DCERC) which will decide whether a candidate complies with the legal requirements and conditions of upholding the Basic Law and bearing allegiance to the HKSAR;
- The DCERC will be chaired by Chief Secretary for Administration and consist of two to four official members and one to three non-official members and it may seek the opinion of the Committee for Safeguarding National Security of the HKSAR;
- The introduction of a monitoring mechanism of District Council members’ performance, which includes investigating members whose behaviour falls short of the public expectation and imposing appropriate sanctions proportionate to the severity of the shortfalls.

== Legal challenge ==
The District Councils (Amendment) Ordinance 2023 has been challenged on the ground that the nomination requirement blocks the right to stand for an election and equal suffrage, which are enshrined in Article 26 of the Basic Law and Article 21 of the Hong Kong Bill of Rights. Although the High Court granted leave for judicial review considering that the case had a "realistic prospect of success," it finally dismissed in the view that the evidence was not sufficient and the new rule under the ordinance might not seem to be manifestly unreasonable.

== Reactions ==
Chinese University of Hong Kong political scientist Ma Ngok criticised the 20 per cent ratio of directly elected seats in the plan for being "regressive", which transformed the District Councils from the elected assemblies managing local affairs to government-appointed advisory committees that leave "very small room" for reflecting public opinion.

Chinese Association of Hong Kong and Macao Studies consultant Lau Siu-kai said Beijing allowing some elected seats was in the hope of gaining public support for the reform and promoting pro-democrats to transition themselves into "patriots" by leaving room for the pro-democrats to participate in the election. He also dismissed the claim that the reform proposal was "regressive", arguing that the District Councils were only auxiliary administrative organs which should not be seen as a channel of Hong Kong democratic development.

The pro-Beijing camp unanimously supported the new plan. The Democratic Alliance for the Betterment and Progress of Hong Kong (DAB) said that it will help ensure national security and "patriots governing Hong Kong" and absorb people from different backgrounds and professions to become district councillors through multiple channels. The Hong Kong Federation of Trade Unions (FTU) said that the new plan ensures balanced participation from all walks of life. The Business and Professionals Alliance for Hong Kong (BPA) said that the plan allows the District Councils to return to its local consultation structure, which can focus on solving local problems. Convened by DAB chairwoman Starry Lee, representatives from pro-Beijing political parties and different social sectors formed an alliance in support of the government reform proposal.

Lo Kin-hei, chairman of the Democratic Party, one of the few remaining pro-democracy parties, said that the democratic element and the functions that district councils can perform will be lower and it would be difficult for his party to secure nominations from the government-controlled "three committees".

Li Ting-fung, vice-chairman of the pro-democracy Hong Kong Association for Democracy and People's Livelihood (ADPL) and Sham Shui Po District Councillor, criticised that the District Officers chairing the councils is the executive-led governance being excessive which become the chief executives in the district level.

Hong Kong newspaper Ming Pao on 11 May announced it would terminate a political satire cartoon strip by Zunzi after an illustration on 9 May satirising the electoral changes which prompted the criticism from the Home and Youth Affairs Bureau accusing the illustration for "distorting and discrediting" the proposal.

== See also ==
- Democratic backsliding
- Democratic development in Hong Kong
- White Paper on District Administration in Hong Kong
- District Council Eligibility Review Committee
