= Wan Chai District Council =

Hong Kong local government body

Wan Chai District Council 灣仔區議會

Type
- Type: Hong Kong District Council of the Wan Chai District

History
- Founded: 20 February 1982 (District Board); 1 July 1997 (Provisional); 1 January 2000 (District Council)

Leadership
- Chair: Fanny Cheung Ngan-ling, Independent

Structure
- Seats: 10 councillors consisting of 2 elected members 4 district committee members 4 appointed members
- DAB: 2 / 10
- Liberal: 2 / 10
- NPP: 2 / 10
- FTU: 1 / 10
- Independent: 3 / 10

Elections
- Voting system: First past the post
- Last election: 10 December 2023

Meeting place
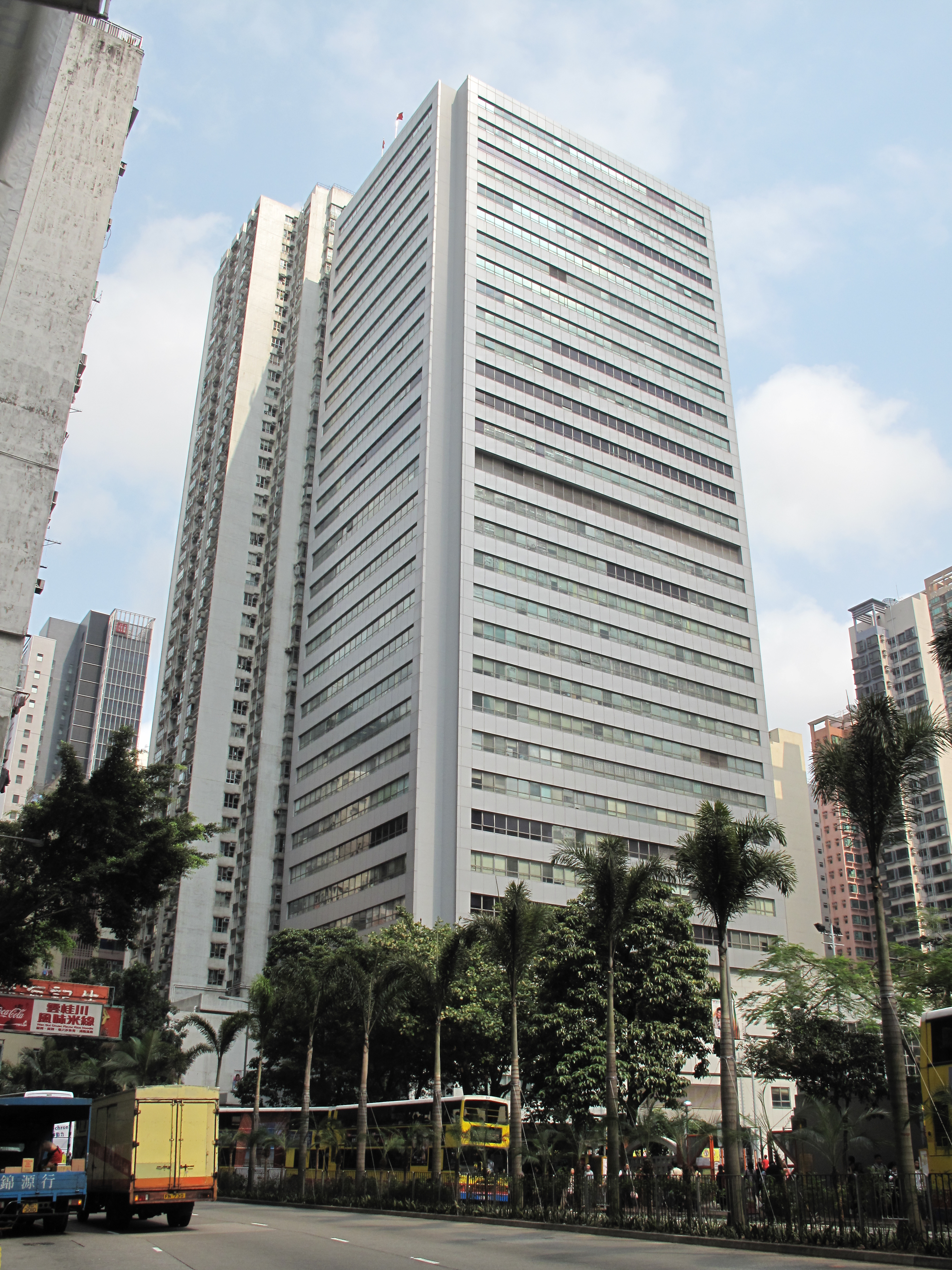
- 21/F, Southorn Centre, 130 Hennessy Road, Wan Chai

Website
- www.districtcouncils.gov.hk/wc/

Wan Chai District Council
- Traditional Chinese: 灣仔區議會
- Simplified Chinese: 湾仔区议会
Transcriptions
Standard Mandarin
- Hanyu Pinyin: Wān Zǎi Qūyìhuì
Yue: Cantonese
- Yale Romanization: Wāan jái kēui yíh wuih
- Jyutping: Waan1 zai2 keoi1 ji5 wui6

The Wan Chai District Council (noted as WC) is the district council for the Wan Chai District in Hong Kong. It is one of 18 such councils. The Wan Chai District Council currently consists of 10 members, of which the district is divided into one constituency, electing a total of 2 members, 4 district committee members, and 4 appointed members. The latest election was held on 10 December 2023.

== History ==
The predecessor of Wan Chai District Council was established on 20 February 1982 under the name of the Wan Chai District Board as the result of the colonial Governor Murray MacLehose's District Administration Scheme reform. The District Board was partly elected with the ex-officio Urban Council members, as well as members appointed by the Governor until 1994 when last Governor Chris Patten refrained from appointing any members to the council.

The Wan Chai District Board was replaced by the Wan Chai Provisional District Board after the Hong Kong Special Administrative Region (HKSAR) was established in 1997 with the appointment system being reintroduced by Chief Executive Tung Chee-hwa. The new Wan Chai District Council was established on 1 January 2000 after the first District Council election in 1999. The council has become fully elected when the appointed seats were abolished in 2011 after the modified constitutional reform proposal was passed by the Legislative Council in 2010.

The Wan Chai District Council is the smallest District Council, having only 13 members due to its small population. Due to its continuing shrinking in size, the government in 2015 decided to transfer Tin Hau and Victoria Park constituencies from the Eastern District Council to Wan Chai.

The Wan Chai District Council has been controlled by the conservatives with Peggy Lam being the chairwoman of the council from 1985 to 2003. The conservative control was interrupted between 2003 and 2007, when the pro-democrats and their allies took advance of the anti-government sentiment of the 2003 July 1 march in which the newly established Civic Act-up under Legislative Councillor Cyd Ho became the largest party in the council in the 2003 election and make nonpartisan Ada Wong Ying-kay the council chairwoman. The pro-democracy council was noted for its community reforms, stressing the citizens' involvement in the community planning, such as the urban renewal projects including the controversy over the demolition of Lee Tung Street. The pro-democracy council lasted for one term until the Democratic Alliance for the Betterment and Progress of Hong Kong (DAB) retook its largest party status in the 2007 election while Civic Act-up lost all their seats.

The 2019–20 pro-democracy protests brought a historic landslide victory to the pro-democrats in the November election with members of the local political group Kickstart Wan Chai who all ran as independents won numbers of seats, ousting long-time pro-Beijing incumbents and took control of the council for the first time since 2003 election.

== Political control ==
Since 1982 political control of the council has been held by the following parties:

Camp in control	Largest party	Years	Composition
No Overall Control	Civic Association	1982 - 1985	
Pro-government	Reform Club	1985 - 1988	
Pro-government	Civic Association	1988 - 1991	
Pro-government	United Democrats	1991 - 1994	
Pro-Beijing	DAB	1994 - 1997	
Pro-Beijing	DAB	1997 - 1999	
Pro-Beijing	DAB	2000 - 2003	
NOC → Pro-democracy	Civic Act-up	2004 - 2007	
Pro-Beijing	DAB	2008 - 2011	
Pro-Beijing	DAB	2012 - 2015	
Pro-Beijing	DAB	2016 - 2019	
Pro-democracy → Pro-Beijing	Liberal	2020 - 2023	
Pro-Beijing	Independent	2024 - 2027	

== Political makeup ==
Elections are held every four years.

Political party	Council members											
Political party	1982	1985	1988	1991	1994	1999	2003	2007	2011	2015	2019	2023
Independent	4	7	5	5	1	3	4	8	7	7	11	1
DAB					3	3	1		3	4		1
Liberal					1	1				1	1	
VSA											1	
NPP									1	1		
Democratic					3	2	2	2				
LSD								1				
Civic Act-up							3					
Wan Chai Community Union							1					
CRA				1		1						
HKPA						1						
LDF					1							
HKDF					1							
United Democrats				2								
Civic	1	1	3	1								
Citizen Forum				1								
HKAS			2									
Reform		2										
Total elected members	5	10	10	10	10	11	11	11	11	13	13	2
Other members	12	6	6	5	0	3	3	3	2	0	0	8

1994

1999

2003

2007

2011

2015

2019

== Members represented ==
Capacity	Code	Constituency	Name	Political affiliation	Term		Notes
Elected	B01	Wan Chai	Nicholas Muk Ka-chun	DAB	1 January 2024	Incumbent	
Elected	B01	Wan Chai	Peggy Lee Pik-yee	Independent	1 January 2024	Incumbent	
District Committees			Joey Lee Man-lung	NPP	1 January 2024	Incumbent	
District Committees			Wind Lam Wai-man	Liberal	1 January 2024	Incumbent	
District Committees			Sam Ng Chak-sum	Independent	1 January 2024	Incumbent	
District Committees			Ruby Mok	Independent	1 January 2024	Incumbent	
Appointed			Lam Wai-kong	FTU	1 January 2024	Incumbent	
Appointed			Chow Kam-wai	Liberal	1 January 2024	Incumbent	
Appointed			Sun Tao-hung	Independent	1 January 2024	Incumbent	
Appointed			Lau Pui-shan	Independent	1 January 2024	Incumbent	

== Leadership ==
=== Chairs ===
Between 1985 and 2023, the chairman is elected by all the members of the council.

Chairman	Years	Political Affiliation
A. G. Cooper	1982–1983	District Officer
Lolly Chiu Yuen-chu	1983–1984	District Officer
Lam Kam-kwong	1984–1985	District Officer
Peggy Lam Pei	1985–2003	Nonpartisan→Liberal→Independent
Ada Wong Ying-kay	2004–2007	Independent→Civic Act-up
Suen Kai-cheong	2008–2015	DAB
Stephen Ng Kam-chun	2016–2019	Independent
Clarisse Yeung Suet-ying	2020–2021	Independent
Ivan Wong Wang-tai	2021–2023	Independent
Fanny Cheung Ngan-ling	2024–present	District Officer

=== Vice Chairs ===
Vice Chairman	Years	Political Affiliation
Suen Kai-cheong	2000–2003	DAB
John Tse Wing-ling	2004–2007	Democratic→Independent
Stephen Ng Kam-chun	2008–2015	Independent
Jennifer Chow Kit-bing	2016–2019	DAB
Mak King-sing	2020–2021	Independent
Wind Lam Wai-man	2021–2023	Liberal
