= Wan Chai District =

District of Hong Kong

Wan Chai 灣仔區
- District
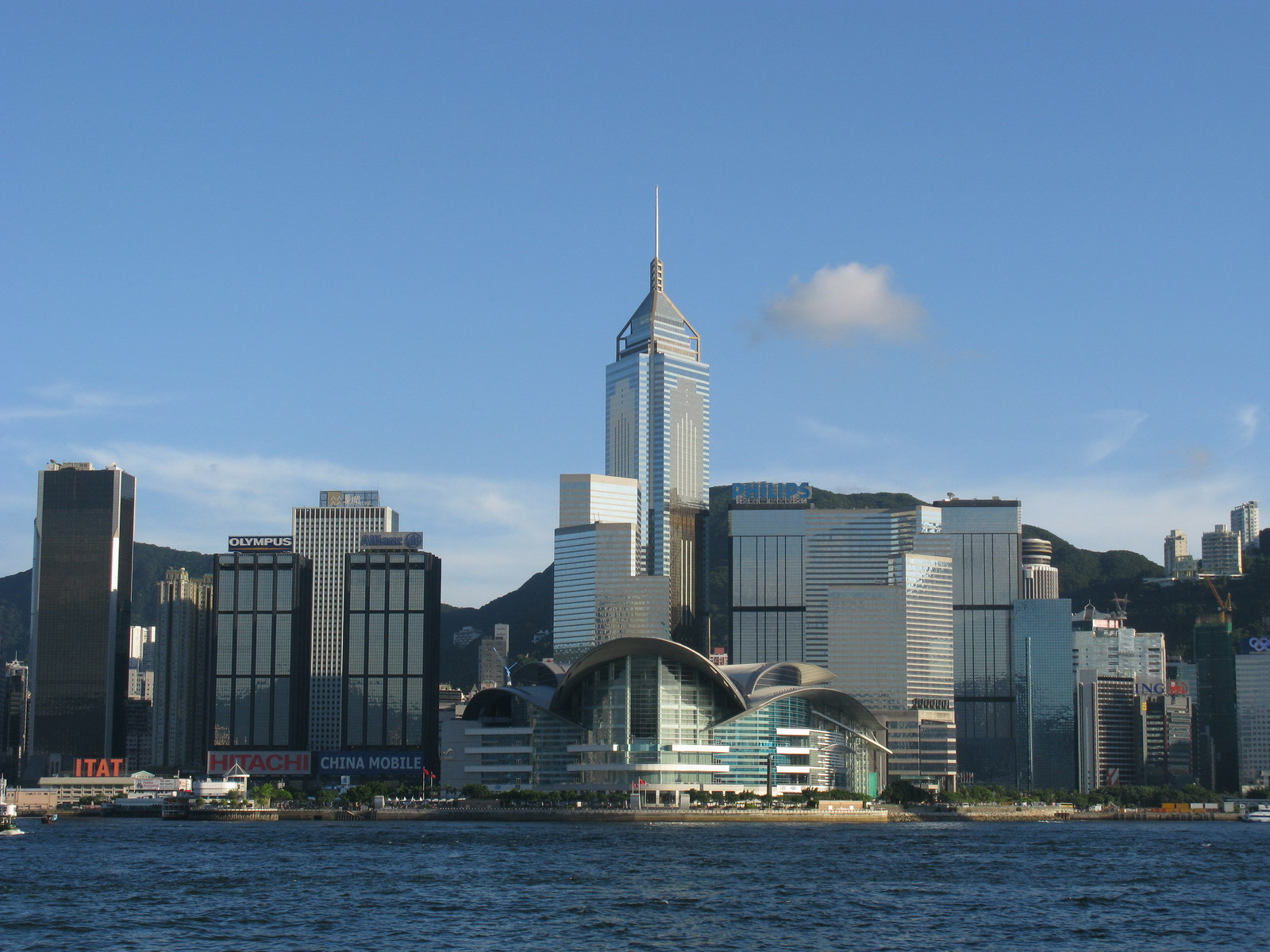
- Hong Kong Convention and Exhibition Centre and high-rise buildings in Wan Chai District

- Location in Hong Kong Wan Chai (Asia)
- Coordinates: 22°16′47″N 114°10′18″E
- Country: China
- SAR: Hong Kong
- Constituencies: 1

Government
  - District Council Chairman: Fanny Cheung Ngan-ling, JP (assumed by the district officer)

Area
  - Total: 10.2 km^{2} (3.9 sq mi)

Population (2021)
  - Total: 166,695: 75% Chinese; 9.8% Filipino; 4.4% White
  - Density: 16,300/km^{2} (42,300/sq mi)
- Time zone: UTC+08:00 (Hong Kong Time)
- Largest neighbourhood by population: Happy Valley (34,259 – 2016 est)
- Location of district office and district council: 130 Hennessy Road, Wan Chai
- Website: Wan Chai District Council

Wan Chai District
- Traditional Chinese: 灣仔區
- Cantonese Yale: Wāanjái kēui
- Jyutping: waan^{1} zai^{2} keoi^{1}
Transcriptions
Standard Mandarin
- Hanyu Pinyin: Wānzǎi qū
Wu
- Wugniu: uae^{1} tse^{3} chiu^{1}
- IPA: ue˥ tse˧ tɕʰy˨
Yue: Cantonese
- Yale Romanization: Wāanjái kēui
- Jyutping: waan^{1} zai^{2} keoi^{1}
- IPA: [wan˥.tsɐj˧˥ kʰɵɥ˥]

Wan Chai District is one of the 18 districts of Hong Kong. Of the four on Hong Kong Island, it is north-central, and had 166,695 residents in 2021, an increase from 152,608 residents in 2011. The district has the second-highest educationally qualified residents with the highest-bracket incomes, the lowest population and the third-oldest quotient. It is a relatively affluent district, with one in five persons having liquid assets of more than HKD 1 million.

== Geography ==
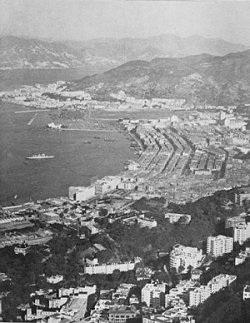
Wan Chai in the 1960s

The area known as Wan Chai is loosely that surrounding Tonnochy Road and the Wan Chai station of the MTR, which is between Admiralty on the west and Causeway Bay on the east. Wan Chai North, where major buildings such as the Hong Kong Convention and Exhibition Centre and Central Plaza stand, refers to the zone north of Gloucester Road, reclaimed from the sea after the 1970s.

The broader administrative "Wan Chai District" includes the areas of Wan Chai, Wan Chai North, Causeway Bay, Happy Valley, Jardine's Lookout, Stubbs Road, Wong Nai Chung Gap, and Tai Hang.

== History ==
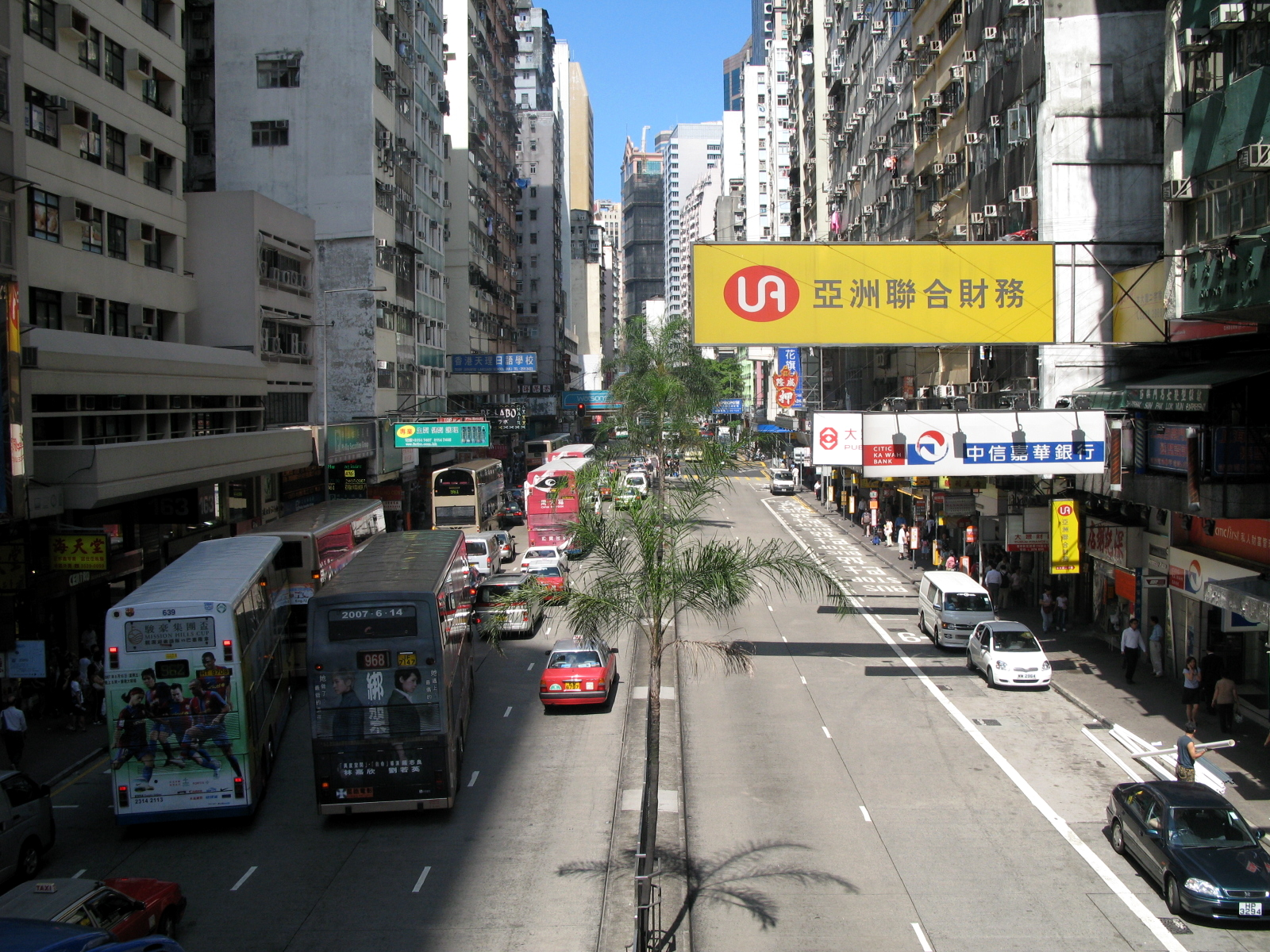
Hennessy Road in 2007

The ceremony of the handover of Hong Kong from the United Kingdom to the People's Republic of China was held in the then-new wing of the Hong Kong Convention and Exhibition Centre in Wan Chai North.

In May 2009, 300 guests and staff members at the Metropark Hotel Wanchai were quarantined, suspected of being infected or in contact with the H1N1 virus during the 2009 swine flu pandemic. A 25-year-old Mexican man who had stayed at the hotel was later found to have the viral infection. He had travelled to Hong Kong from Mexico via Shanghai.

== Politics ==
The district council of Wan Chai consists of 10 councillors, with 2 directly elected, 4 indirectly elected and 4 appointed. Chairmanship is assumed by the District Officer starting from 2023.

== Diversity ==
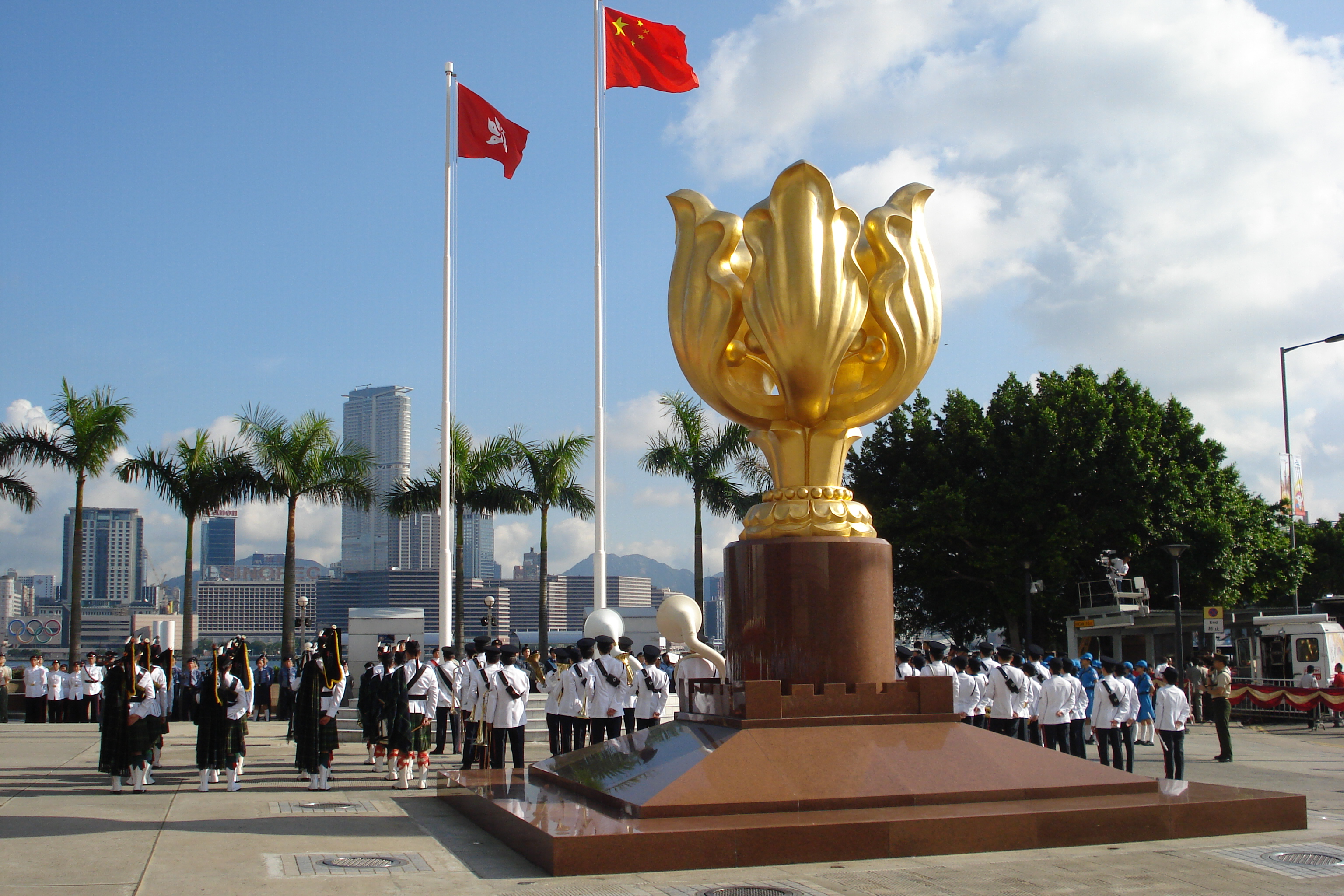
The Flag Rising Ceremony at Golden Bauhinia Square

Today Wan Chai is sometimes described as the heart of the city, representing the epitome of the Hong Kong lifestyle – it has a well-established arts centre, the large exhibition and conference complexes, luxury apartments, five-star and non-five-star hotels, shopping malls, metropolitan office towers and a large government building cluster. It has a multitude of home decoration shops, bars and Mahjong centres. Wan Chai District houses a mosque, as well as cemeteries for several different faiths. Close to the urban streets is Bowen Drive, popular for jogging and walking by politicians, movie stars, and government officials.

== Entertainment and shopping ==
There are numerous bars and strip joints in the red-light district part of Wan Chai catering to tourists. Within this, the former Fenwick Pier's Fleet Arcade hosted the only McDonald's that served alcohol and pizza in Hong Kong until 2004 when it was closed and was replaced by an up-market restaurant. Benches of the McDonald's were however left behind at the lobby of the arcade.

Fenwick Pier became landlocked in 2016 following reclamation by the government, and was later closed and handed back to the government on 11 February 2022, with a new fire station to be built on the land of where the arcade stood. Prior to the handover of Hong Kong, Fenwick pier was regularly visited by vessels, with numbers ranging from 37 to 99 annually.

Johnston Road and Queen's Road East are the two major streets in the area. Export clothing shops line Johnston and Luard Roads predominantly. Queen's Road East has many stores selling Chinese style wooden furniture.

Spring Garden Lane and Tai Wo Street are lined with stalls selling vegetables, fruit and household items.

Tai Yuen Street specialises in toys in stalls and shops.

Lee Tung Street was in the 2010s converted into a Lee Tung Avenue zone of luxurious residential apartments, shopping, restaurants and bars.

== Education ==
The main Hong Kong Central Library is located in Wan Chai District. Additionally, Hong Kong Public Libraries operates the Lockhart Road Public Library and Wong Nai Chung Public Library within the district.

Additionally, schools such as Wah Yan College Hong Kong, St. Paul Secondary School and Queen's College are present here.

== Notable places ==
Next to the Hong Kong Convention and Exhibition Centre is the "Golden Bauhinia Square". There is a huge sculpture of a bauhinia, which is the representative flower of Hong Kong, in the square. This is a popular tourist spot in Hong Kong for visitors from Mainland China and also the location of a flag-raising ceremony which occurs daily and in a special form on Chinese National Day and other occasions.

Notable skyscrapers include:

- Central Plaza, the third tallest skyscraper in Hong Kong, located in Wan Chai North
- Hopewell Centre

The Old Wan Chai Post Office is a declared monument. There is also the Police Museum near the junction of Stubbs Road and Peak Road.

The Stubbs Road Lookout is a viewing point of the Victoria Harbour. The famous Lovers' Stone is located on scenic Bowen Road.

Tai Yuen Street is called 'Toy Street' as this street has a lot of toy shops.

== Demographics ==
According to a household survey by the Census and Statistics Department, the median household income is the second highest of Hong Kong.

As of 2021, the district has a population of 166,695 people. It's one of the most diverse districts in Hong Kong, with 75% of the population being Chinese. The largest ethnic minority groups are Filipinos (9.8%) and White (4.4%).

== Cross-harbour transport ==
The first tunnel which crossed Victoria Harbour, the Cross-Harbour Tunnel opened in 1972, links the former Kellett Island, now part of Wan Chai, with Hung Hom in Kowloon.

The MTR East Rail line was extended to Admiralty in 2022, passing through Wan Chai North. The new Exhibition Centre Station was built near the Hong Kong Convention and Exhibition Centre, and a new cross-harbour tunnel was built to connect this new station to the new East Rail line platform in Hung Hom.

The Star Ferry operates a ferry route from Wan Chai Pier near Hong Kong Convention and Exhibition Centre to Tsim Sha Tsui.

== Appearances in popular culture ==
- The 2000 computer game Deus Ex features Wan Chai Market as the main district in the Hong Kong chapters of the game.
- Almost a third of the 2001 video game Shenmue II is spent in Wan Chai. A small portion of the city is divided into fictional quarters modelled after similar locations.
- The location of the 1957 novel and 1960 film The World of Suzie Wong is set in Wan Chai.
- The 2010 Hong Kong film Crossing Hennessy starring Jacky Cheung and Tang Wei is set in Wan Chai.

== See also ==
- List of places in Hong Kong
- Wan Chai Pier
