= 2026 Hong Kong Election Committee Subsector elections =

2026 Election Committee Subsector elections
- 22 November 2026

723 (of the 1,500 seats) in the Election Committee 751 seats needed for a majority
- Registered: 9,342 (Note: Of those 9,342 registered voters, 5,709 were obliged to vote as the remaining were voters of the uncontested seats.)▲(17.2%)
- Turnout: 5,640 (98.79%) ▲9.02pp
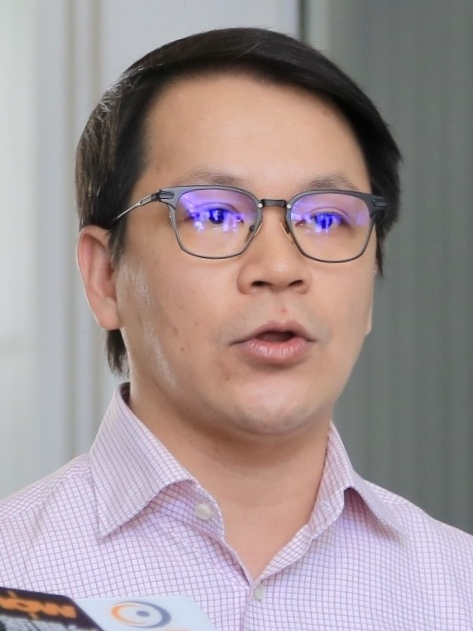

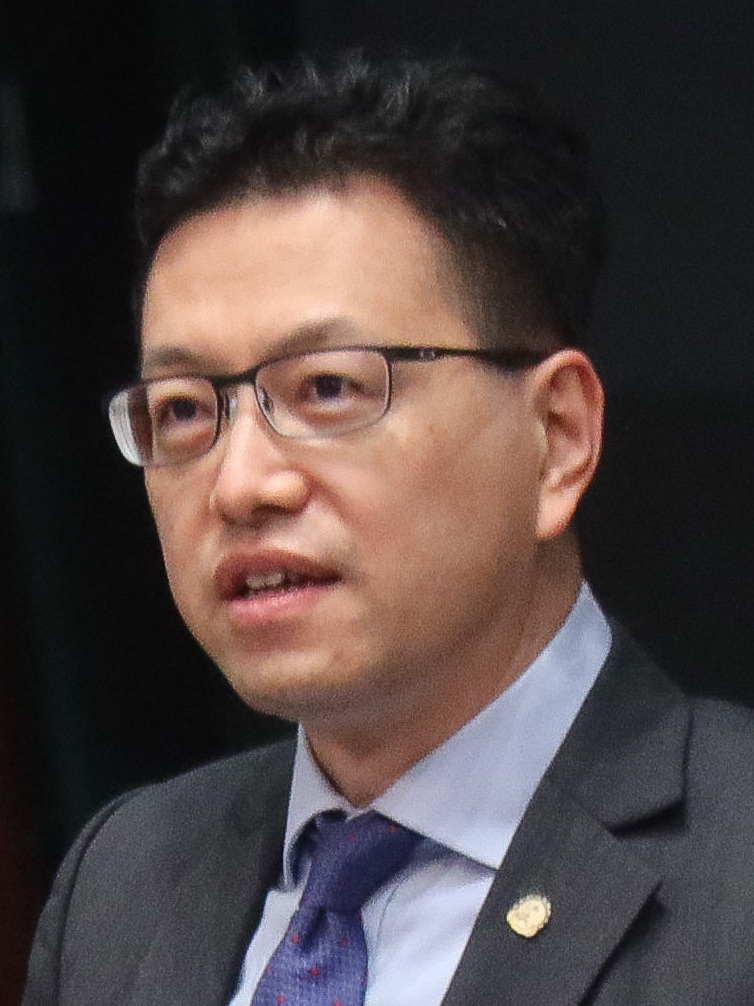

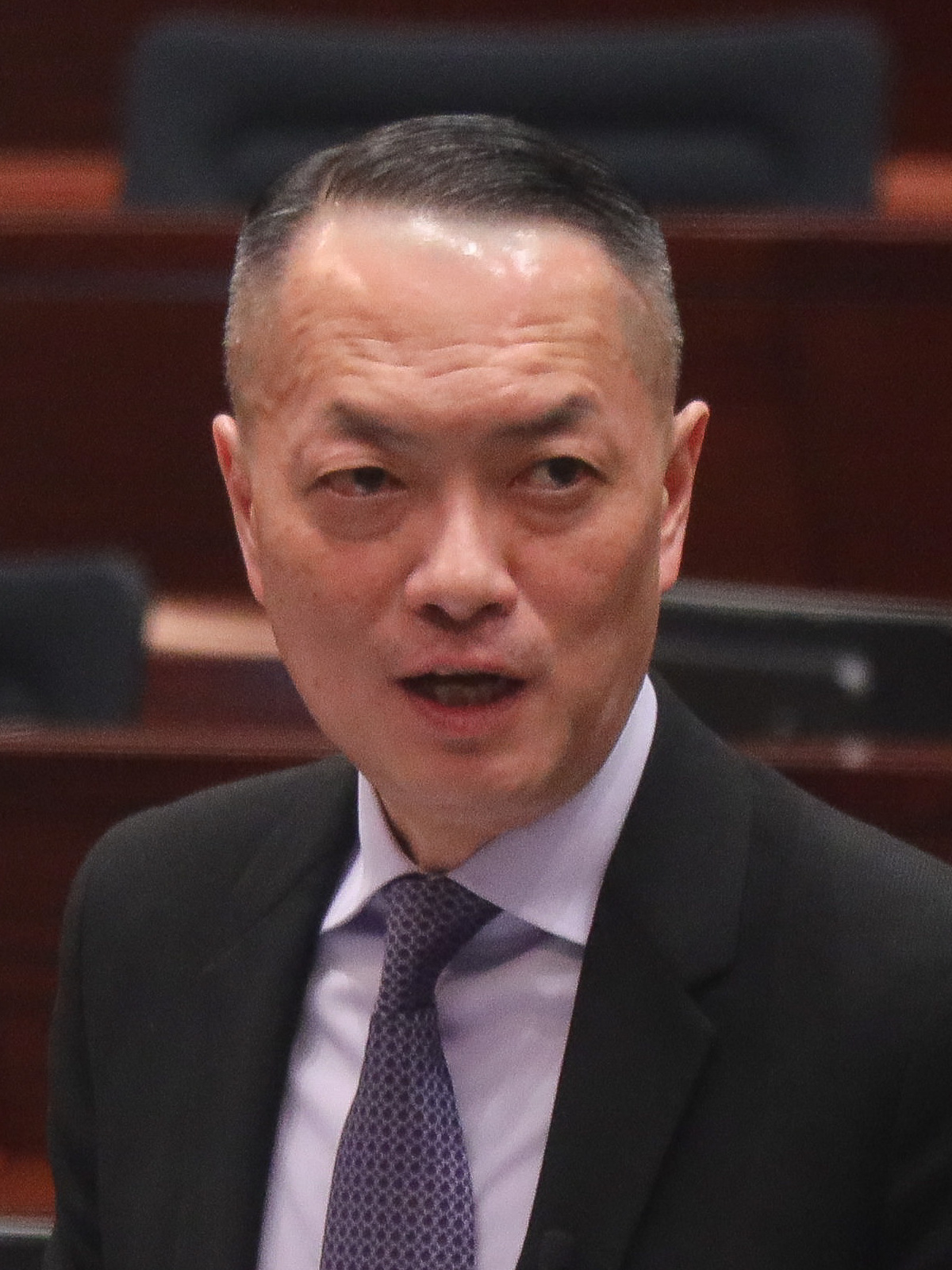

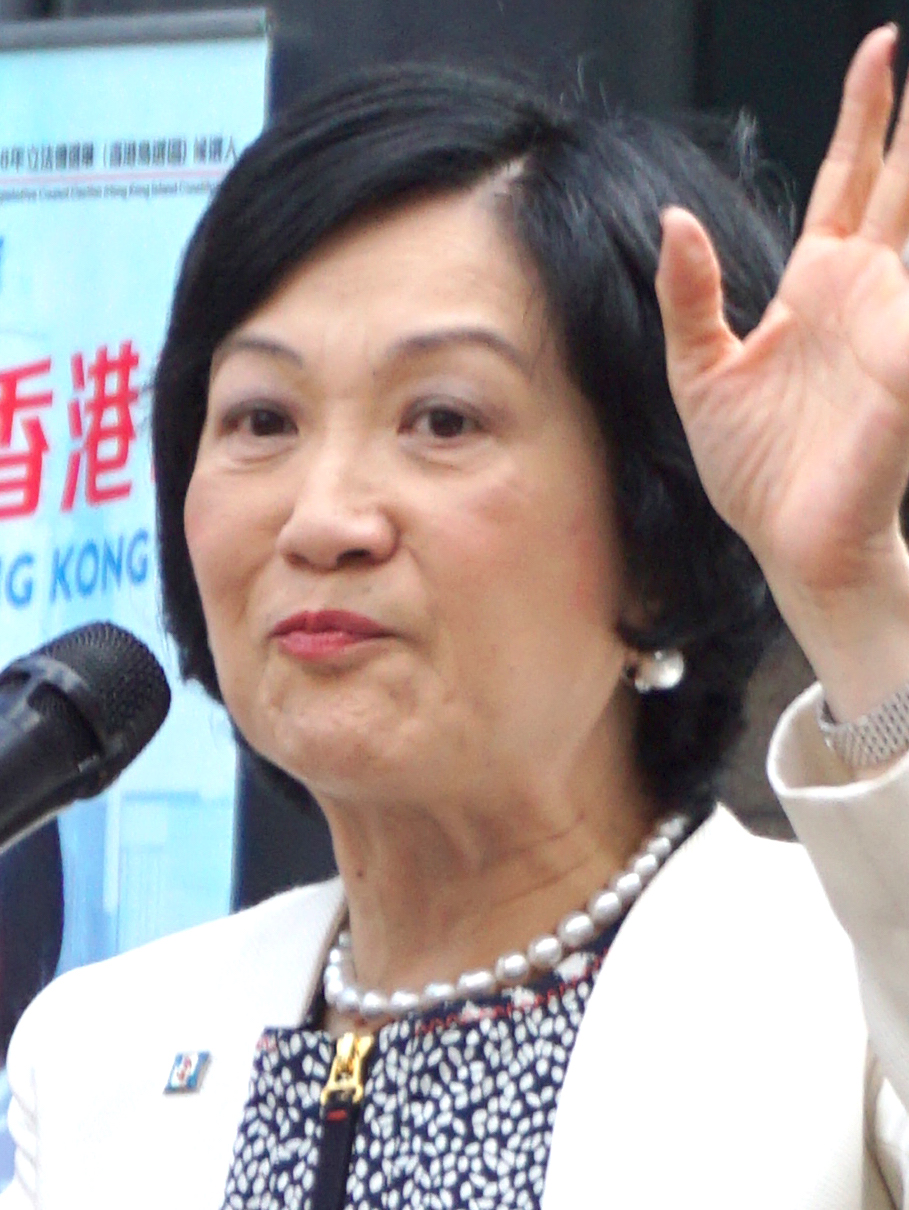

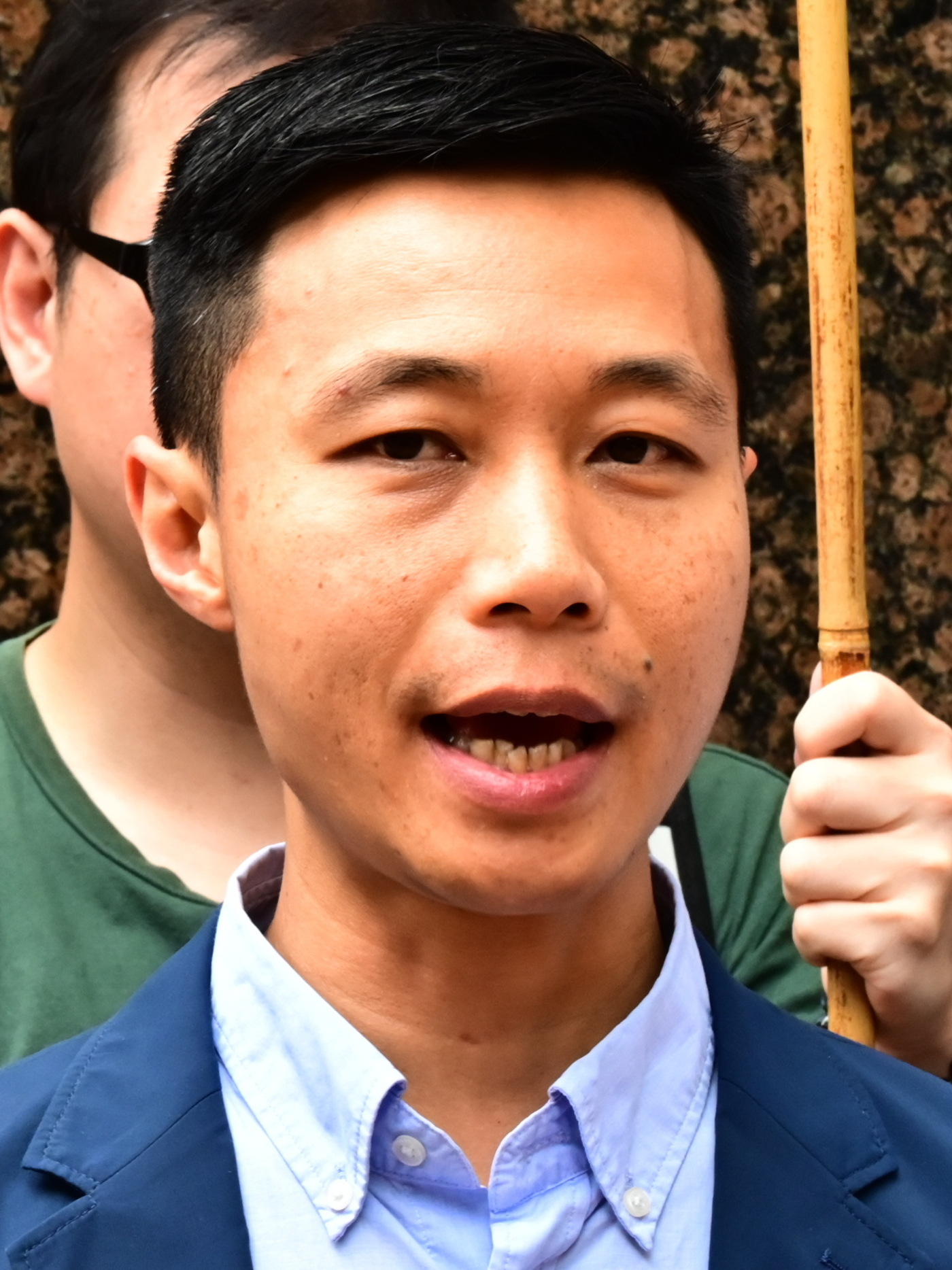

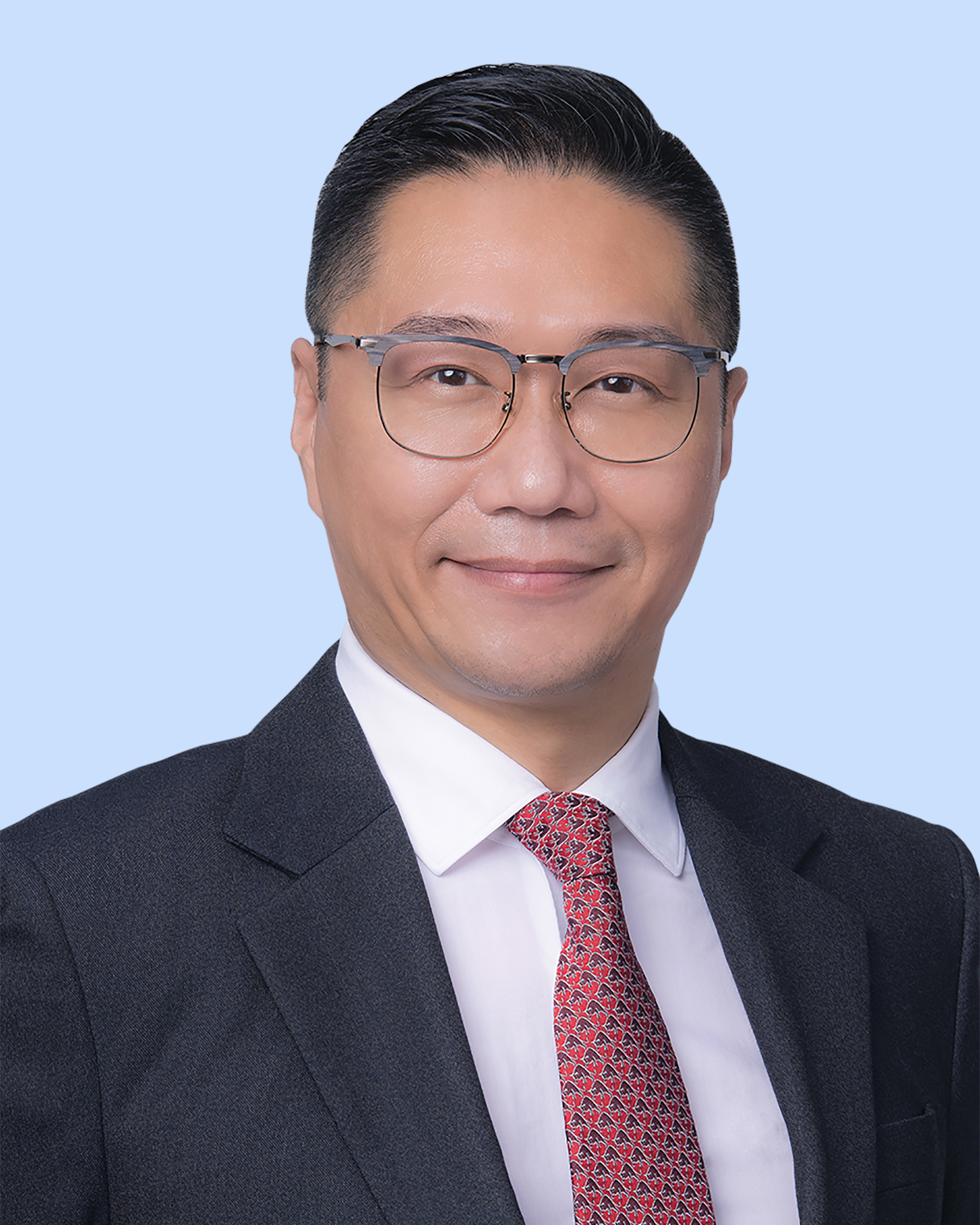
	First party	Second party	Third party
Leader	Gary Chan	Ng Chau-pei	Ng Wing-ka
Party	DAB	FTU	BPA
Alliance	Pro-Beijing	Pro-Beijing	Pro-Beijing
	Fourth party	Fifth party	Sixth party
Leader	Regina Ip	Lam Chun-sing	Peter Shiu
Party	NPP	FLU	Liberal
Alliance	Pro-Beijing	Pro-Beijing	Pro-Beijing

The 2026 Hong Kong Election Committee Subsector elections will be held on 22 November 2026 to select the 1,500-member Election Committee. The five-year term would begin on 1 February 2027 and would select the new Chief Executive in 2027 as well as 40 out of the 90 seats in the Legislative Council.

== Background ==
The committee gained power after the political revamp in 2021, which also weakened the democratic component of the body as many subsectors previously elected by individuals were not elected by corporations, and the number of unelected seats grew. The Pro-Beijing camp held nearly every seat of the committee since the opposing pro-democracy camp was all but absent from the elections.

Nominees will undergo national security vetting through the Candidate Eligibility Review Committee.

== Seats ==
Allocation of seats and electoral methods of the Election Committee Subsectors
Sector	Subsector	Election	Nomination	Ex-officio
First Sector: Industrial, commercial and financial sectors		300		
I	Catering	16		
I	Commercial (First)	17		
I	Commercial (Second)	17		
I	Commercial (Third)	17		
I	Employers' Federation of Hong Kong	15		
I	Finance	17		
I	Financial Services	17		
I	Hotel	16		
I	Import and Export	17		
I	Industrial (First)	17		
I	Industrial (Second)	17		
I	Insurance	17		
I	Real Estate and Construction	17		
I	Small and Medium Enterprises	15		
I	Textiles and Garment	17		
I	Tourism	17		
I	Transport	17		
I	Wholesale and Retail	17		
Second Sector: The professions		300		
II	Accountancy	15	15 (Note: Nominated from among Hong Kong Accounting Advisors appointed by the Ministry of Finance.)	
II	Architectural, Surveying, Planning and Landscape	15		15 (Note: Responsible persons of statutory bodies, advisory bodies and relevant associations.)
II	Chinese Medicine	15	15 (Note: Nominated from among Hong Kong members of the Council of the World Federation of Chinese Medicine Societies.)	
II	Education	14		16 (Note: University presidents or chairpersons of the board of governors or the council of universities; and responsible persons of statutory bodies, advisory bodies and relevant associations.)
II	Engineering	15		15
II	Legal	15	9 (Note: Nominated from among Hong Kong members of the Council of the China Law Society.)	6 (Note: Hong Kong members of the Committee for the Basic Law of the HKSAR under the NPC Standing Committee.)
II	Medical and Health Services	15		15
II	Social Welfare	15		15
II	Sports, Performing Arts, Culture and Publication	15	15 (Note: Nominated respectively by the Sports Federation and Olympic Committee of Hong Kong, China, China Federation of Literary and Art Circles Hong Kong Member Association and Hong Kong Publishing Federation.)	
II	Technology and Innovation	15	15 (Note: Nominated from among Hong Kong academicians of the Chinese Academy of Sciences and the Chinese Academy of Engineering.)	
Third Sector: Grassroots, labour, religious and other sectors		300		
III	Agriculture and Fisheries	60		
III	Associations of Chinese Fellow Townsmen	60		
III	Grassroots associations	60		
III	Labour	60		
III	Religious		60	
Fourth Sector: Members of the Legislative Council, representatives of district organisations and other organisations		300		
IV	Members of the Legislative Council			90
IV	Heung Yee Kuk	27		
IV	Representatives of Associations of Hong Kong Residents in the Mainland		27 (Note: Nominated by associations of Hong Kong residents in the Mainland.)	
IV	Representatives of Members of Area Committees, District Fight Crime Committees, and District Fire Safety Committees of Hong Kong Island and Kowloon	76		
IV	Representatives of Members of Area Committees, District Fight Crime Committees, and District Fire Safety Committees of the New Territories	80		
Fifth Sector		300		
V	HKSAR Deupties to the NPC and HKSAR Members of the CPPCC National Committee			190
V	Representatives of Hong Kong Members of Relevant National Organisations	110		
Total		982	156	362
Total		1,200		

== Results ==
Sector	Subsector	Seats	Standing
I	Catering	16	17
I	Commercial (First)	17	19
I	Commercial (Second)	17	19
I	Commercial (Third)	17	21
I	Employers' Federation of Hong Kong	15	18
I	Finance	17	20
I	Financial Services	17	20
I	Hotel	16	18
I	Import and Export	17	19
I	Industrial (First)	17	20
I	Industrial (Second)	17	20
I	Insurance	17	20
I	Real Estate and Construction	17	19
I	Small and Medium Enterprises	15	17
I	Textiles and Garment	17	19
I	Tourism	17	20
I	Transport	17	20
I	Wholesale and Retail	17	19
II	Accountancy	15	17
II	Architectural, Surveying, Planning and Landscape	15	18
II	Chinese Medicine	15	19
II	Education	14	
II	Engineering	15	17
II	Legal	15	16
II	Medical and Health Services	15	23
II	Social Welfare	15	25
II	Sports, Performing Arts, Culture and Publication	15	
II	Technology and Innovation	15	18
III	Agriculture and Fisheries	60	73
III	Associations of Chinese Fellow Townsmen	60	
III	Grassroots associations	60	76
III	Labour	60	
III	Religious	—	
IV	Members of the Legislative Council	—	
IV	Heung Yee Kuk	27	30
IV	Representatives of Associations of Hong Kong Residents in the Mainland	—	
IV	Representatives of Members of Area Committees, District Fight Crime Committees, and District Fire Safety Committees of Hong Kong Island and Kowloon	76	88
IV	Representatives of Members of Area Committees, District Fight Crime Committees, and District Fire Safety Committees of the New Territories	80	93
V	HKSAR Deupties to the NPC and HKSAR Members of the CPPCC National Committee (Note: Originally from the Fourth Sector, two subsectors are combined.)	—	
V	Representatives of Hong Kong Members of Relevant National Organisations	110	

== Party affiliation ==
	First Sector	Second Sector	Third Sector	Fourth Sector	Fifth Sector
DAB	3		13	45	7
BPA	8	1	4	5	1
NPP/Civil Force	5			13	1
Liberal	5		1	2	
FTU			46	15	2
FLU			13	1	
Civil Force			1		
New Prospect			1		
FPHE			1	2	
FEW				1	
