= Area committees of Hong Kong =

Administration division in Hong Kong

Area Committees (ACs, Chinese: 分區委員會) are parts of the district administration division in the Hong Kong Special Administration Region. The Committees were formed in 1972 primarily, earlier than the District Councils. Nowadays, the ACs have functions of promoting public participation, advising community involvement activities, offering advice on issues affecting area, discussing matters of public interest and supporting the implementation of district administration. The activities are organized by the ACs including exhibitions, fun fairs, social functions, volunteer works, arts, culture, sports activities and competitions. AC members are appointed by Director of the Home Affairs Department. At present, there are 71 area committees in 18 districts of Hong Kong.

== See also ==
- Home Affairs Department
- District councils of Hong Kong
- Legislative Council of Hong Kong
