= District Council Eligibility Review Committee =

Hong Kong government statutory committee

- Traditional Chinese: 區議會資格審查委員會
- Simplified Chinese: 区议会资格审查委员会
Transcriptions
Standard Mandarin
- Hanyu Pinyin: Qūyìhuì Zīgé Shěnchá Wěiyuán Huì
Yue: Cantonese
- Jyutping: keoi1 ji5 wui6 zi1 gaak3 sam2 caa4 wai2 jyun4 wui6*2

District Council Eligibility Review Committee (區議會資格審查委員會) is a Hong Kong government statutory committee, which responsible for review and confirm the eligibility of all candidates for the Hong Kong District Council.

The Establishment of District Council Eligibility Committee has already been approved by the legislative council and has officially confirmed and effective. It was one of an important part of Hong Kong District Council Elections Reform of 2023.

Members of the District Council Eligibility Review Committee include a chairman, 2 to 4 official members and 1 to 3 non-official members. Every member of the Committee shall be appointed by the Chief Executive by notice in the Gazette.

According to the law, the District Council Eligibility Review Committee must consult the Committee for Safeguarding National Security of the Hong Kong Special Administrative Region (National Security Committee) whether the candidates of the district councilors are comply or not comply with the requirements of supporting the "Basic Law of the Hong Kong Special Administrative Region" and allegiance to the Hong Kong Special Administrative Region of the People's Republic of China. The law requires the committee made the decisions based on the opinions given by the National Security Committee.

== See also ==
- Candidate Eligibility Review Committee
- Hong Kong District Council
- 2023 Hong Kong electoral changes
- 2023 Hong Kong local elections
- 2021 Hong Kong electoral changes
