= District Officer (Hong Kong) =

A District Officer (DO) (Chinese: 民政事務專員) is a directorate public officer who serves as the head of one of the 18 district offices in Hong Kong, making them the top representative of the Hong Kong Government to the district to which they are assigned. The position of District Officer was established in urban Hong Kong, Kowloon and New Kowloon in 1968. DOs have served as the ex-officio commanders of Care Teams in 18 political areas since 2023, and as chairmen of District Councils from 2024. District Officers are assisted by an Assistant District Officer (ADO), who is an administrative officer (AO) or a senior administrative officer (SAO). By convention, all DOs are appointed as justices of the peace by the Chief Secretary for Administration or Chief Executive of Hong Kong.

== Duties and powers ==
The District Officer has the responsibility of overseeing directly the operation of the District Administration Scheme in the district, and chairing the District Management Committee in each district which is a government committee consisting of representatives of the core departments in the district. DO is charged with implementing and co-ordinating the execution of district programmes, ensuring that the advice of the District Council is properly followed up, and promoting residents' participation in district affairs. In addition, DO is required to maintain close liaison with different sectors of the community and reflect their concerns and problems to the government. It is his duty to ensure that district problems are resolved promptly through inter-departmental consultation and co-operation. Also, DO acts as a link between the District Council and departments and serves as a mediator between them when problems arise.

The District Officer is also involved with the community at every level. DO has a role to mediate in the resolution of disputes between corporate bodies and residents. DO performs an advisory and liaison role in providing assistance to building management bodies. DO operates a public enquiry service to enable the community to have easy access to services and information provided by government. In emergency situations, the District Officer is responsible for co-ordinating various departments' efforts on the ground for ensuring the effective provision of relief services. DO is also appointed to a returning officer during the elections.

== District Office structure ==
District Office
District Officer; Directorate Pay Scale Point 2
Assistant District Officer; Administrative Officer/Senior Administrative Officer
District Management Committee | District Council | District Committees | Care Teams
Chairperson (served by District Officer) | Chairperson (served by District Officer) | Chairpersons (elected by committees members) | Commander
