= 2021 Hong Kong electoral changes =

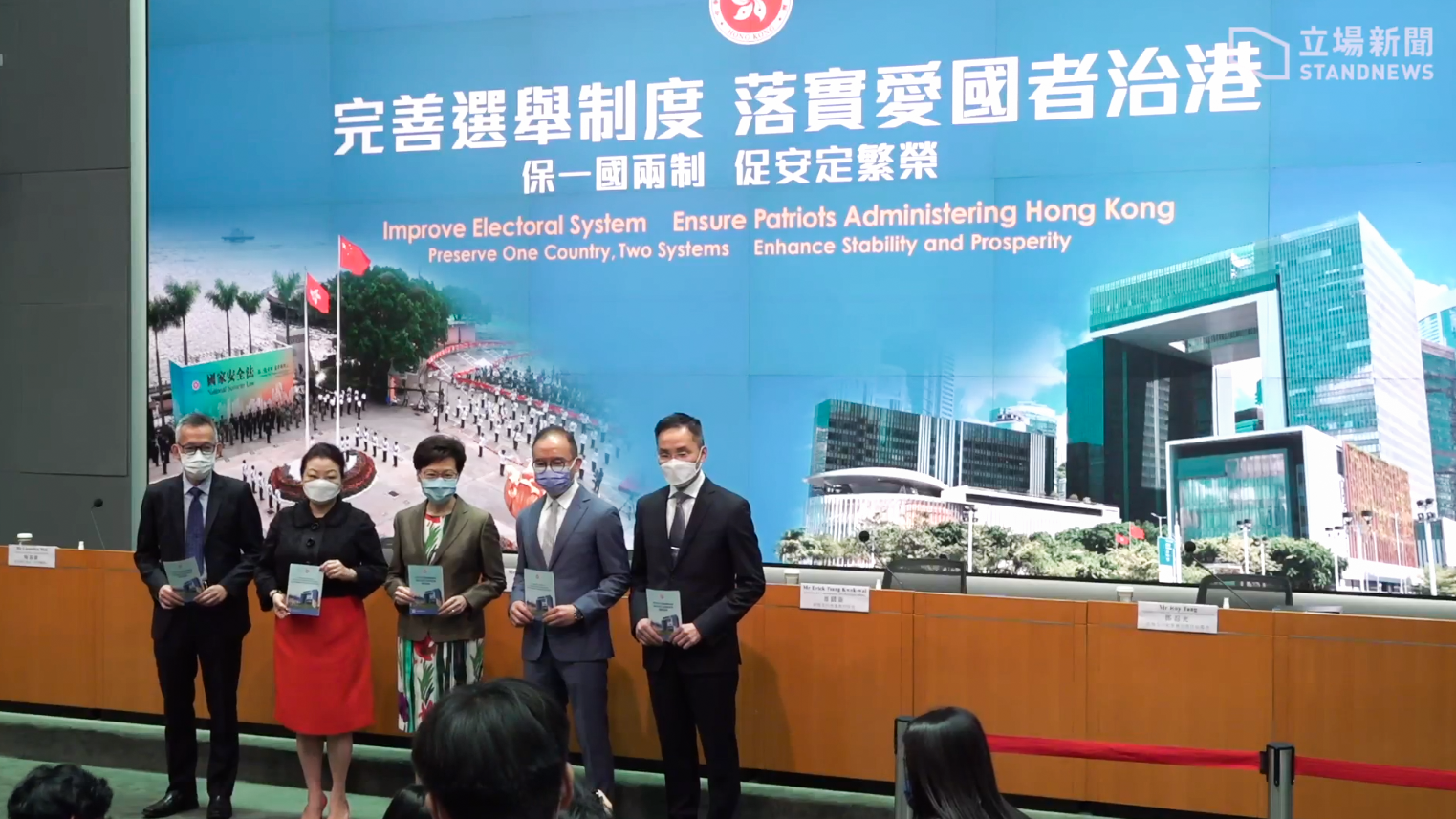
The Hong Kong Government unveiled the Improving Electoral System (Consolidated Amendments) Bill, the local legislation for electoral reform, on 13 April 2021.

The National People's Congress (NPC) initiated electoral changes in the Hong Kong Special Administrative Region (HKSAR) on 11 March 2021 to "amend electoral rules and improve the electoral system" for its chief executive (CE) and the Legislative Council (LegCo), in order to ensure a system in which only Chinese Communist Party-defined "patriots" govern Hong Kong. The reforms have been widely criticized for their negative impact on the democratic representation in the Hong Kong legislature.

With the National People's Congress Standing Committee (NPCSC) amending the Annex I and Annex II of the Basic Law of Hong Kong, the compositions of the Election Committee (EC), which is responsible for electing the Chief Executive, and the Legislative Council were revamped. The size of the Election Committee was increased from 1,200 to 1,500 seats with a sizeable number of new seats nominated and elected by government-appointed and Beijing-controlled organisations. The Legislative Council was increased from 70 to 90 seats. The directly elected 35 current seats shrunk to 20 seats, and an extra 40 seats would be elected by the Election Committee. A new vetting mechanism would also be created for every candidate running for the Chief Executive, the Legislative Council and the Election Committee based on the approval of the Hong Kong Committee for Safeguarding National Security according to the review by the National Security Department of the Hong Kong Police Force (HKPF) whose decision would be final and could not be appealed.

The electoral changes, which came after the passing of the Hong Kong national security law in June 2020 and the subsequent mass crackdown including arrests of opposition activists, were widely seen as a move to further curb the influence of the pro-democracy camp in the wake of the widespread anti-government protests of 2019 and the electoral landslide of the 2019 District Council election.

== Background ==
=== 2019 anti-extradition protests and electoral landslide ===
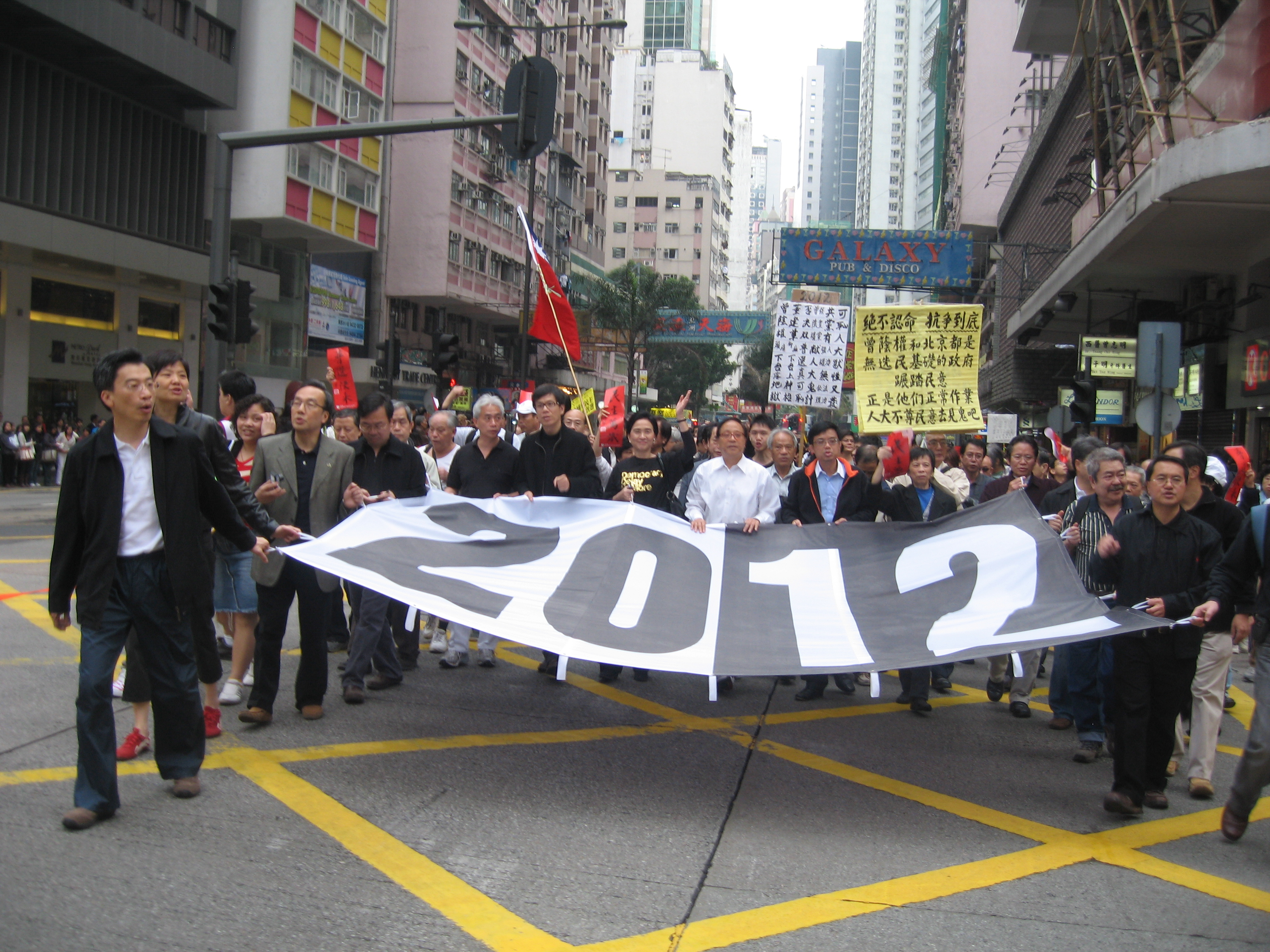
Pro-democracy protesters marched on 13 January 2008 demanding universal suffrage by 2012.

Since the transfer of sovereignty over Hong Kong in 1997, the democratic movement had been calling for genuine universal suffrage for the Chief Executive, the Legislative Council (LegCo) as enshrined in the Article 45 and the Article 68 of the Basic Law of Hong Kong. The National People's Congress Standing Committee (NPCSC) had repeatedly ruled out universal suffrage, first in 2004 and again in 2007. However, in the 2007 decision, NPCSC stated that the universal suffrage might be implemented in the 2017 Chief Executive election. With the 2012 electoral system being unchanged, the moderate democrats struck a deal with the Beijing authorities in the 2012 constitutional reform package in 2010 which allowed the enlargement of the Election Committee (EC) and the creation of the five new District Council (Second) seats to be nominated by the District Councillors and elected by popular vote.

The breakthrough between the pro-democrats and the Beijing authorities did not quell the demand for universal suffrage. Instead it created internal strife and fragmentations between different factions in the pro-democracy camp and the rise of localist movement which called for more confrontational approach. The decision on the constitutional reform framework laid by the NPCSC on 31 August 2014 dashed the hopes of the democracy activists striving for the right to direct elections, which triggered the 79-day Occupy protests. The democratic development in Hong Kong had stagnated since then, while a new wave of independence movement was on the rise. In the 2016 New Territories East by-election, pro-independence activist Edward Leung received over 15 per cent of the popular vote despite his loss to the pro-democratic Civic Party's Alvin Yeung. Leung and other pro-independence activists were then barred from running in the September general election. Baggio Leung and Yau Wai-ching of Youngspiration, who was backed by Edward Leung, were elected, but were soon disqualified over their oath-taking manner.

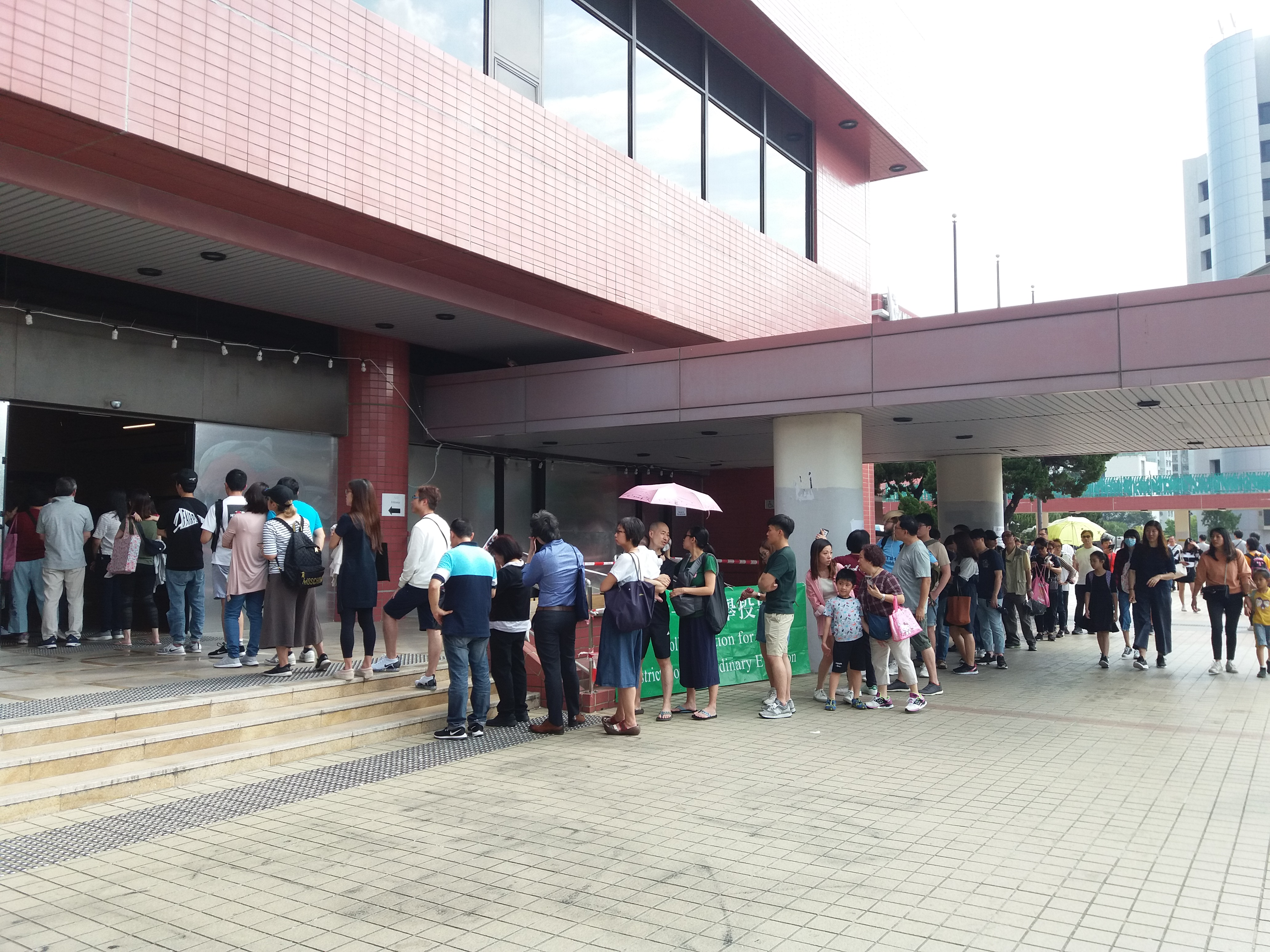
Long queue outside a polling station in the 2019 District Council election.

With pro-democrats infighting, Occupy activists imprisoned and the pro-independence movement suppressed, the democratic movement seemed to run out of steam. Then in the summer of 2019, Chief Executive Carrie Lam’s push for the amendment to the extradition law triggered a series of unprecedented widespread protests. The protesters soon demanded genuine universal suffrage as one of their five key goals. In November 2019, the pro-democrats received a historic electoral landslide victory in the District Council election, inflicting a heavy defeat on the pro-Beijing parties by taking over more than 80 per cent of the seats and seizing control of 17 of the 18 District Councils. In January 2020, Wang Zhimin was removed from his post as Director of the Liaison Office of the Central People's Government in Hong Kong which was widely seen as a response to his failure to advise the central government accurately about the vulnerability of pro-Beijing candidates at the election.

=== National security law and "patriots governing Hong Kong" ===
In June 2020, the NPCSC enacted the Hong Kong national security law to criminalise "separatism, subversion, terrorism and foreign interference" which many interpreted as a crackdown on civil liberties, government critics, and the independence movement. In July, the pro-democrats organised a territory-wide primary election to maximise their chance to obtain a majority in the upcoming Legislative Council election, despite the government warning of their potentially breaching the new national security law as some of the candidates vowed to vote down the government budget in order to pressure the administration to respond to the demands of the protesters. Chief Executive Carrie Lam abruptly invoked the Emergency Regulations Ordinance to postpone the election, citing the recent resurgence of the COVID-19 cases. However the decision was widely seen as the latest in a rapid series of aggressive moves by the Beijing authorities to thwart opposition momentum and neutralise the pro-democracy movement. The 55 organisers and candidates in the primary were later arrested under the national security law on 6 January 2021, making it the largest crackdown under the national security law since its passage.

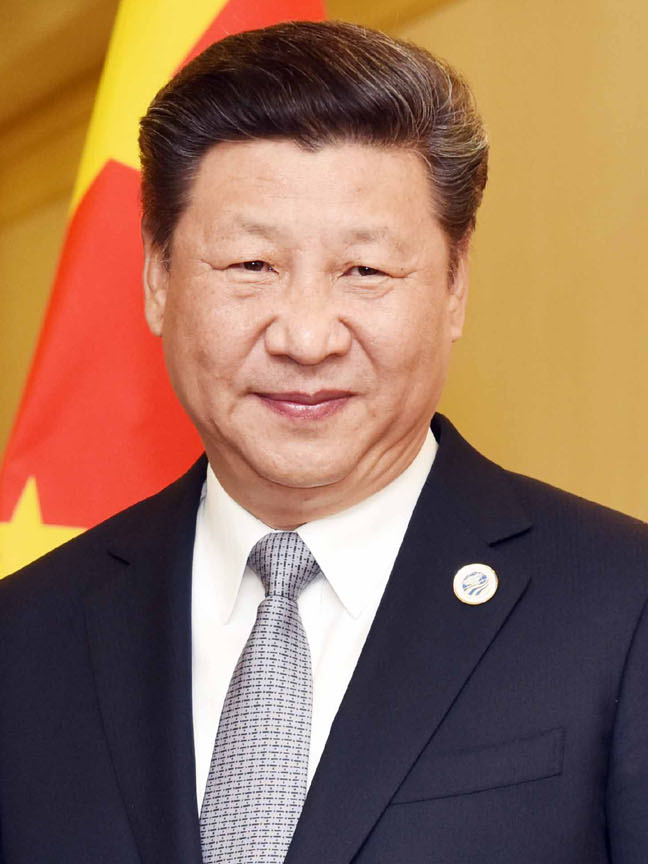
General Secretary of the Chinese Communist Party Xi Jinping stated that Hong Kong could only maintain its long-term stability and security by ensuring "patriots governing Hong Kong".

After the passage of the national security law, the Beijing authorities began to stress the importance of "patriots governing Hong Kong." On 11 November 2020, the NPCSC adopted a decision. The decision barred Legislative Council members from supporting Hong Kong independence, refusing to recognise Beijing's sovereignty over Hong Kong, seeking help from "foreign countries or foreign forces to interfere in the affairs of the region", or committing "other acts that endanger national security". It also unseated the four sitting legislators, Alvin Yeung, Kwok Ka-ki, Dennis Kwok and Kenneth Leung, whose candidacies had been invalidated by the returning officers earlier in July. Zhang Xiaoming, deputy director of the Hong Kong and Macao Affairs Office (HKMAO) stated that "patriots governing Hong Kong" had become a new "legal norm". He urged the "comprehensive and accurate understanding and implementation" of the principle of "One Country, Two Systems". He stressed that one should see that "One Country" of the socialist system with Chinese characteristics led by the Chinese Communist Party (CCP) being the premise and foundation for "Two Systems" which support and guarantee Hong Kong's capitalist system; safeguarding national sovereignty, security and development interests being the primary purpose of "One Country, Two Systems"; the central government's overall jurisdiction being the source of a high degree of autonomy; Hong Kong's legal system being incorporated into the constitutional order on the basis of the National Constitution and the Basic Law; Hong Kong's development being inseparable from and benefited from the mainland; and "patriotism" should be added before the core values of democracy, freedom and human rights.

On 27 January 2021, CCP general secretary Xi Jinping said that Hong Kong could only maintain its long-term stability and security by ensuring "patriots governing Hong Kong" when he heard a work report delivered by Carrie Lam. On 1 March, HKMAO director Xia Baolong in the seminar of "patriots governing Hong Kong" stated that Hong Kong must establish a "democratic electoral system with Hong Kong characteristics."

== NPC decision ==
Decision on Improving HKSAR's Electoral System

National People's Congress
- Long title: Decision of the National People's Congress on Improving the Electoral System of the Hong Kong Special Administrative Region
- Passed by: National People's Congress
- Passed: 11 March 2021
- Introduced by: Standing Committee of the National People's Congress
- Voting summary: 2,895 voted for; None voted against; 1 abstained
- Status: In force

On 5 March 2021, National People's Congress (NPC) vice chairman Wang Chen unveiled a draft resolution to "adjust and improve" Hong Kong's electoral system in the coming NPC session. Chinese state media Xinhua stated an editorial that "for years, anti-China forces seeking to disrupt Hong Kong have been colluding with external forces in an attempt to seize the jurisdiction over Hong Kong, with clear goals and concrete actions," it reported. "Effective measures must be taken to block these pawns of anti-China forces from being elected to HKSAR’s governance architecture, and knock them out once and for all." In his annual work report to the National People's Congress, Premier Li Keqiang stated that "we will resolutely guard against and deter external forces' interference in the affairs of Hong Kong and Macau."

Local media reported that the composition of the Legislative Council (LegCo) would be increased from 70 seats to 90 seats, with the reintroduction of the Election Committee constituency elected by the Election Committee (EC), the 1,200-member electoral college responsible for nominating and electing the Chief Executive (CE). The Election Committee would effectively dilute the number of directly elected Legislative Council members. The size of the Election Committee would also be increased to 1,500 members, filled with members of the Beijing-appointed Chinese People’s Political Consultative Conference (CPPCC) and other pro-Beijing groups, replacing the seats elected by the democrat-controlled District Councillors. The Election Committee would also be given new powers to vet Legislative Council and District Council candidates. Wang said the new rules would fix the "loopholes" in Hong Kong's electoral system, which had allowed opposition activists who advocated for the Hong Kong independence to be elected. Due to the new composition of the Legislative Council would be basis on the Election Committee elected in late 2021, the postponed 2020 Legislative Council election might be delayed for another full year, according to the local media reports.

The National People's Congress on 11 March voted 2,895 in favour, zero against and one abstention, for the changes to Hong Kong electoral system. In addition to the tightening of the control of the Election Committee, a Chief Executive candidate would have to secure 188 nominations, at least 15 nominations from each of the five sectors in order to enter the race. The decision would also create a "qualification vetting system" for Hong Kong's electoral process to screen out candidates.

=== Provisions ===
The decision has nine articles:

1. Improving the electoral system of the HKSAR must fully and faithfully implement the policy of "one country, two systems" under which the people of Hong Kong administer Hong Kong with a high degree of autonomy, uphold the constitutional order in the HKSAR as established by the Constitution and the Basic Law, ensure the administration of Hong Kong by Hong Kong people with patriots as the main body, effectively improve the governance efficacy of the HKSAR, and safeguard the right to vote and the right to stand for election of permanent residents of the HKSAR.
2. The HKSAR shall establish an Election Committee which is broadly representative, suited to the HKSAR's realities, and representative of the overall interests of its society. The Election Committee shall be responsible for electing the Chief Executive designate and part of the members of the LegCo. The Election Committee shall also be responsible for nominating candidates for the Chief Executive and LegCo members, as well as for other matters. The Election Committee shall be composed of 1,500 members from the following five sectors: industrial, commercial and financial sectors; the professions; grassroots, labour, religious and other sectors; LegCo members and representatives of district organizations; Hong Kong deputies to the NPC, Hong Kong members of the National Committee of the Chinese People's Political Consultative Conference and representatives of Hong Kong members of related national organizations.
3. The Chief Executive shall be elected by the Election Committee and appointed by the Central People's Government. Candidates for the office of the Chief Executive shall be nominated jointly by not less than 188 members of the Election Committee, among whom the number of members of each sector should be not less than 15. The Election Committee shall elect the Chief Executive designate by secret ballot on a one-person-one-vote basis. The election of the Chief Executive designate shall require a simple majority vote of all the members of the Election Committee.
4. The LegCo of the HKSAR shall be composed of 90 members in each term. Members of the LegCo shall include members returned by the Election Committee, those returned by functional constituencies, and those by geographical constituencies through direct elections.
5. A candidate qualification review committee of the HKSAR shall be established. The committee shall be responsible for reviewing and confirming the qualifications of candidates for the Election Committee members, the Chief Executive, and the LegCo members. The HKSAR shall improve the system and mechanisms related to qualification review, to ensure that the qualifications of candidates are in conformity with the Basic Law, the Law on Safeguarding National Security in the HKSAR, the NPC Standing Committee's interpretation of Article 104 of the Basic Law, the NPC Standing Committee's decision on the qualification of HKSAR LegCo members, and provisions of relevant local laws of the HKSAR.
6. The NPC Standing Committee is authorized to, in accordance with the decision on improving the electoral system of the HKSAR, amend Annex I: Method for the Selection of the Chief Executive of the Hong Kong Special Administrative Region and Annex II: Method for the Formation of the Legislative Council of the Hong Kong Special Administrative Region and Its Voting Procedures, to the Basic Law.
7. In accordance with the decision and the Basic Law's Annex I and Annex II amended by the NPC Standing Committee, the HKSAR shall amend relevant local laws, and organize and regulate election activities accordingly.
8. The Chief Executive of the HKSAR shall submit in a timely manner reports to the Central People's Government on relevant important situations including the institutional arrangements for elections of the HKSAR and the organization of the elections.
9. The decision shall go into effect as of the date of promulgation.

== NPCSC amendments ==
On 30 March 2021, local media cited National People’s Congress Standing Committee (NPCSC) Hong Kong delegate Tam Yiu-chung saying that all 167 members present had voted in favour of the amendments to Annex I and II of the Basic Law to revamp Hong Kong's electoral system. After the passage, President Xi Jinping signed Presidential Orders No. 75 and 76 to amend the Annex I and II of the Hong Kong Basic Law respectively on the same day.

Under the new annexes, a Candidate Eligibility Review Committee would be set up to vet the qualifications of candidates, based on the approval of the Hong Kong Committee for Safeguarding National Security according to the review by the National Security Department of the Hong Kong Police Force (HKPF) of which its decision would be final and could not be appealed.

=== Annex I: Chief Executive ===
Allocation of seats and electoral methods of the Election Committee Subsectors
Sector	Subsector	Seats	Methods		Composition		Seat change
Sector	Subsector	Seats	Methods		Ind.	Corp.	Seat change
First Sector
I	Industrial (First)	17	Elect			✓	▼1
I	Industrial (Second)	17	Elect			✓	▼1
I	Textiles and Garment	17	Elect			✓	▼1
I	Commercial (First)	17	Elect			✓	▼1
I	Commercial (Second)	17	Elect			✓	▼1
I	Commercial (Third) (Note: Former Hong Kong Chinese Enterprises Association renamed.)	17	Elect			✓	▲1
I	Finance	17	Elect			✓	▼1
I	Financial Services	17	Elect			✓	▼1
I	Insurance	17	Elect			✓	▼1
I	Real Estate and Construction	17	Elect			✓	▼1
I	Transport	17	Elect			✓	▼1
I	Import and Export	17	Elect			✓	▼1
I	Tourism	17	Elect			✓	▼1
I	Hotel	16	Elect			✓	▼1
I	Catering	16	Elect			✓	▼1
I	Wholesale and Retail	17	Elect			✓	▼1
I	Employers' Federation of Hong Kong	15	Elect			✓	▼1
I	Small and Medium Enterprises	17	Elect			✓	New
Second Sector
II	Technology and Innovation (Note: Information Technology subsector replaced.)	30	Nominate (Note: Nominated from among Hong Kong academicians of the Chinese Academy of Sciences and the Chinese Academy of Engineering.)	15	✓		New
II	Technology and Innovation	30	Elect	15		✓ (Note: Individual voting replaced.)	▼15
II	Engineering	30	Ex-officio (Note: Responsible persons of statutory bodies, advisory bodies and relevant associations.)	15	✓		New
II	Engineering	30	Elect	15		✓	▼15
II	Architectural, Surveying, Planning and Landscape	30	Ex-officio	15	✓		New
II	Architectural, Surveying, Planning and Landscape	30	Elect	15		✓	▼15
II	Accountancy	30	Nominate (Note: Nominated from among Hong Kong Accounting Advisors appointed by the Ministry of Finance.)	15	✓		New
II	Accountancy	30	Elect	15		✓	▼15
II	Legal	30	Ex-offcio (Note: Hong Kong members of the Committee for the Basic Law of the HKSAR under the NPC Standing Committee.)	6	✓		New
II	Legal	30	Nominate (Note: Nominated from among Hong Kong members of the Council of the China Law Society.)	9	✓		New
II	Legal	30	Elect	15		✓	▼15
II	Education (Note: Education and Higher Education subsectors merged.)	30	Ex-officio (Note: University presidents or chairpersons of the board of governors or the council of universities; and responsible persons of statutory bodies, advisory bodies and relevant associations.)	16	✓		New
II	Education	30	Elect	14		✓	▼46
II	Sports, Performing Arts, Culture and Publication (Note: Originally under the Third Sector.)	30	Nominate (Note: Nominated respectively by the Sports Federation and Olympic Committee of Hong Kong, China, China Federation of Literary and Art Circles Hong Kong Member Association and Hong Kong Publishing Federation.)	15	✓		New
II	Sports, Performing Arts, Culture and Publication	30	Elect	15		✓	▼45
II	Medical and Health Services (Note: Medical and Health Services subsectors merged.)	30	Ex-officio	15	✓		New
II	Medical and Health Services	30	Elect	15		✓	▼45
II	Chinese Medicine	30	Nominate (Note: Nominated from among Hong Kong members of the Council of the World Federation of Chinese Medicine Societies.)	15	✓		New
II	Chinese Medicine	30	Elect	15		✓	▼15
II	Social Welfare	30	Ex-officio	15	✓		New
II	Social Welfare	30	Elect	15		✓	▼45
Third Sector
III	Agriculture and Fisheries	60	Elect			✓	0
III	Labour	60	Elect			✓	0
III	Grassroots associations	60	Elect			✓	New
III	Associations of Chinese Fellow Townsmen	60	Elect			✓	New
III	Religious	60	Nominate			✓	0
Fourth Sector
IV	Members of the Legislative Council	90	Ex-officio		✓		▲20 (Note: Expanded from the size of the Legislative Council.)
IV	Heung Yee Kuk	27	Elect		✓		▲1
IV	Representatives of Members of Area Committees, District Fight Crime Committees, and District Fire Safety Committees of Hong Kong Island and Kowloon (Note: Hong Kong and Kowloon District Councils subsector replaced.)	76	Elect		✓		New
IV	Representatives of Members of Area Committees, District Fight Crime Committees, and District Fire Safety Committees of the New Territories (Note: New Territories District Councils subsector replaced.)	80	Elect		✓		New
IV	Representatives of Associations of Hong Kong Residents in the Mainland	27	Nominate (Note: Nominated by associations of Hong Kong residents in the Mainland.)		✓		New
Fifth Sector
V	HKSAR Deputies to the NPC and HKSAR Members of the CPPCC National Committee (Note: Originally from the Fourth Sector, two subsectors are combined.)	190	Ex-officio		✓		▲103
V	Representatives of Hong Kong Members of Relevant National Organisations	110	Elect		✓		New

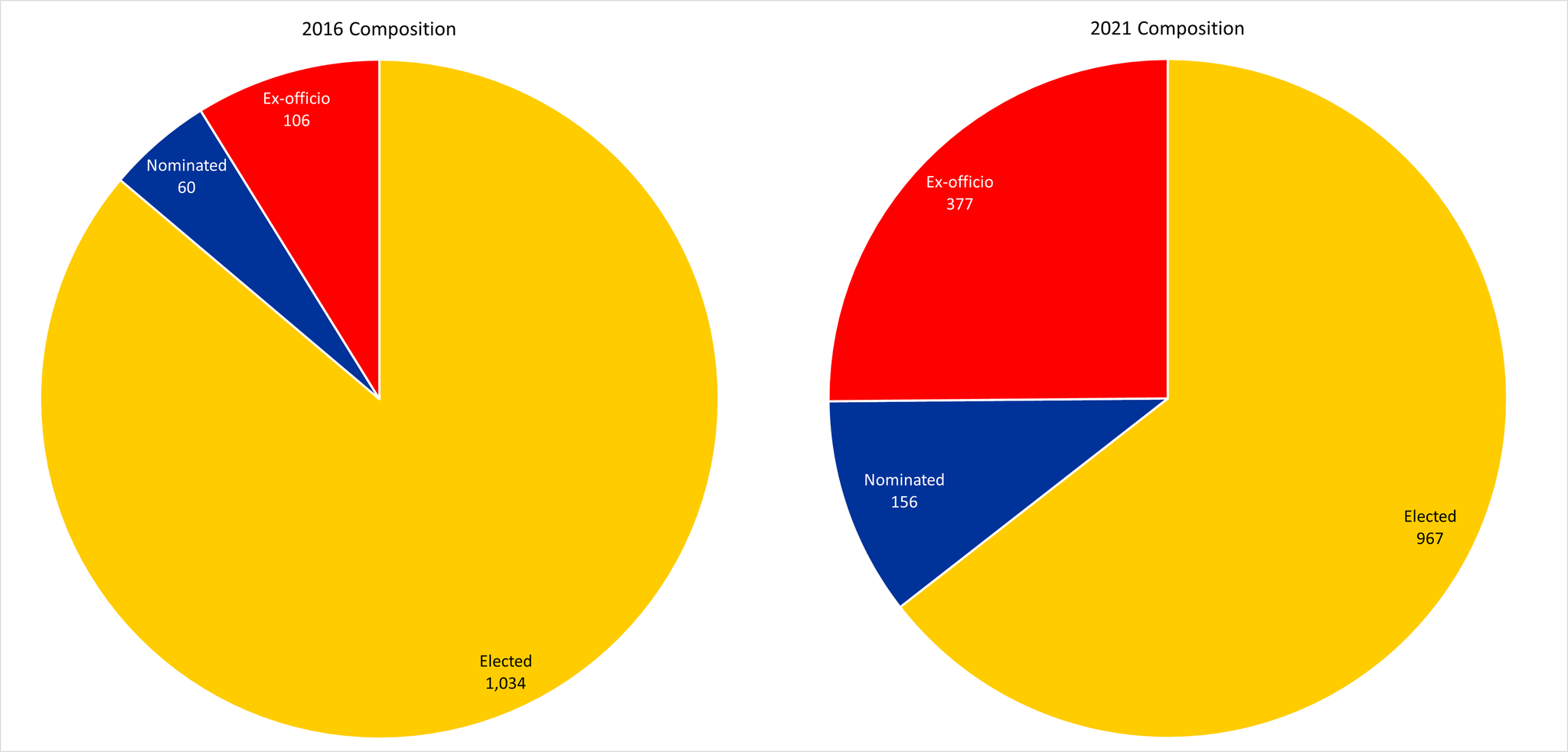
Changes to the composition of the Election Committee: 2016 composition (1,200 seats): Elected [Ind./Corp.] (1,034); Nominated (60); Ex-officio (106); 2021 composition (1,500 seats): Elected [Ind./Corp.] (967); Nominated (156); Ex-officio (377)

For the Chief Executive election, the size of the Election Committee would be increased from 1,200 to 1,500 seats. All of the 117-seat Hong Kong and Kowloon and New Territories District Councils subsectors on the committee which would have been held by the pro-democrats in the 2019 electoral landslide would be eliminated and replaced by "representatives of members of area committees", including members of the government-appointed District Fight Crime Committees and the District Fire Safety Committee of Hong Kong Island, Kowloon and the New Territories who are appointed by the Director of Home Affairs under the Home Affairs Department, as well as representatives of the pro-Beijing associations of Hong Kong residents in the mainland. A new 300-seat Fifth Sector would consist of the 190 seats including the Hong Kong deputies to the National People’s Congress (NPC) and the Hong Kong members of the National Committee of the Chinese People’s Political Consultative Conference (CPPCC), as well as 110 seats comprising representatives of "Hong Kong members of relevant national organisations".

On the other hand, the seats of the traditional strongholds of the pro-democrats in the Second Sector of professions, including Education and Social Welfare subsectors, would be halved. The original Education and Higher Education subsectors which had 30 seats each would be merged into a 30-seat subsector, while Medical and Health Services subsectors which had 30 seats each would also be merged into a 30-seat subsector. Some of the seats in the other pro-democratic strongholds would also be nominated rather than elected. For instances, half of 30 members of the newly created Technology and Innovation subsector would be nominated from among Hong Kong academicians of the Chinese Academy of Sciences and the Chinese Academy of Engineering; while 15 of the 30-seat Accountancy subsector would be nominated from among Hong Kong accounting advisers appointed by the Chinese Ministry of Finance; nine seats in the Legal subsector would be nominated from the council of the China Law Society. Up to half of the seats from the subsectors of Engineering, Architectural, Surveying, Planning and Landscape, Education, Medical and Health Services, and Social Welfare would be elected by associations instead of individuals.

A post of chief convener would be created for the Election Committee who shall be an Election Committee member who holds an office of state leadership. A candidate for the office of Chief Executive shall be nominated by not less than 188 members of the Election Committee, with not less than 15 members from each of the five sectors, meaning that anyone who would want to run for Chief Executive would have to get passed the Beijing-appointed Fifth Sector.

=== Annex II: Legislative Council ===
Changes to the composition of the Legislative Council: 2016 composition (70 seats): Directly elected geographical constituencies (35); Nominated by District Councillors, directly elected District Council (Second) functional constituency (5); Indirectly elected trade-based functional constituencies (30); 2021 composition (90 seats): Directly elected geographical constituencies (20); Indirectly elected trade-based functional constituencies (30); Newly created Election Committee constituency (40)

For the Legislative Council, the total number of seats would be increased to 90 from 70, but the number of directly elected seats would be scrapped to 20 from 35, whereas the enlarged Election Committee would elect 40 seats in the Legislative Council. The territory-wide directly elected District Council (Second) "super seats" which were introduced by the government in its 2010 electoral reform package would be scrapped. For the functional constituencies, the District Council (First) who might have been held by the pro-democrats due to the 2019 District Council landslide would be eliminated, while another pro-democracy stronghold, Health Services, would be merged with Medical, and Information Technology was scrapped. Three new constituencies would be created, namely Commercial (Third), Technology and Innovation (replacing Information Technology with a much smaller electorate), and the HKSAR deputies to the National People’s Congress (NPC), HKSAR members of the National Committee of the Chinese People’s Political Consultative Conference (CPPCC), and representatives of relevant national organisations.

The 10 new geographical constituencies: New Territories North; New Territories North East; New Territories South East; New Territories South West; New Territories North West; Kowloon East; Kowloon Central; Kowloon West; Hong Kong Island East; Hong Kong Island West

For the directly elected geographical constituencies, the total number of 35 seats in the original five geographical constituencies elected by proportional representation system would be replaced by 10 geographical constituencies where two members would be returned by each geographical constituency. In each geographical constituency, a voter may only vote for one candidate as a single non-transferable vote (SNTV). The two candidates who obtain the highest numbers of votes in each district shall be elected. The new electoral system was seen to further curb the advantages of the pro-democracy camp, as the opposition usually received 55 to 60 per cent of the popular vote and won more than half of the directly elected seats. Under the new system, the pro-Beijing minority would almost be sure to win at least half of the 20 directly elected seats. The SNTV system will also require voters to coordinate among themselves which candidate they should elect among the same bloc, leading to coordination problems which is a disadvantage among the pro-democrats.

The dual voting system was maintained, of which the passage of motions, bills or amendments to government bills introduced by individual members of the Legislative Council would have to require majority of votes from both of the two groups of members present, changed from the indirectly elected functional constituencies and by directly elected geographical constituencies respectively, to the members returned by the Election Committee, and those returned by functional constituencies and by geographical constituencies through direct elections. A candidate for a geographical or functional constituency would have to be nominated by two but no more than four members from each sector of the Election Committee.

== Local legislation ==
Improving Electoral System (Consolidated Amendments) Ordinance 2021

Legislative Council of Hong Kong
- Long title: An Ordinance to amend certain electoral legislation to improve the electoral system by revising the methods of forming the Election Committee, selecting the Chief Executive and forming the Legislative Council in accordance with Annexes I and II to the Basic Law; to specify the date of the general election for the seventh term of office of the Legislative Council; to introduce certain measures to facilitate the conduct of Legislative Council elections, District Council elections, Election Committee subsector elections and Chief Executive elections; to introduce the requirements of signing a statutory declaration and written oath as prerequisites for being a member of the Election Committee; to introduce offences for certain conduct obstructing another person from voting, or inciting another person not to vote, or to cast an invalid vote, at an election; to make minor technical amendments; and to provide for related matters.
- Citation: Ordinance 14 of 2021
- Territorial extent: Hong Kong
- Enacted by: Legislative Council of Hong Kong
- Signed: 29 May 2021
- Commenced: 31 May 2021

Legislative history
- Bill title: Improving Electoral System (Consolidated Amendments) Bill 2021
- Introduced by: Secretary for Constitutional and Mainland Affairs Erick Tsang
- Introduced: 14 April 2021
- First reading: 14 April 2021
- Second reading: 27 May 2021
- Third reading: 27 May 2021

Amends
- Emergency (Date of General Election) (Seventh Term of the Legislative Council) Regulation; Electoral Affairs Commission Ordinance; Legislative Council Ordinance; District Councils Ordinance; Elections (Corrupt and Illegal Conduct) Ordinance; Chief Executive Election Ordinance; High Court Ordinance; Hong Kong Court of Final Appeal Ordinance; Electronic Transactions (Exclusion) Order; Travel Industry Ordinance
- Status: Amended

After the passage of the NPCSC amendment to the Annex I and the Annex II of the Basic Law of Hong Kong, the SAR government began to roll out the local electoral legislation. Chief Executive Carrie Lam announced the new timetable for the next three elections, by further postponing the Legislative Council election from the originally scheduled September to December, swapping with the planned Election Committee subsector elections, as the reintroduction of the Election Committee seats to the Legislative Council meant that the new Election Committee had to be elected prior to the Legislative Council election. Meanwhile, the next Chief Executive election would be held in March 2022 as originally scheduled.

Timetable for the 2021–2022 electoral cycle
Election	Original schedule	New schedule
2021 Election Committee subsector elections	December 2021	19 September 2021
2021 Legislative Council election	5 September 2021 (Note: Initially scheduled on 6 September 2020, but later postponed to 5 September 2021.)	19 December 2021
2022 Chief Executive election	27 March 2022	

On 13 April after the Executive Council passed the Improving Electoral System (Consolidated Amendments) Bill 2021, the government unveiled the 765-page bill with more details of the future electoral system. A raft of changes to the Elections (Corrupt and Illegal Conduct) Ordinance would also include legislation to "regulate acts that manipulate or undermine elections", which would criminalise inciting people not to vote or cast blank or spoiled ballots. Violators could face up to three years in prison.

The bill also unveiled the composition of the Election Committee (EC) subsectors, where the individual voting in the pro-democracy leaning professions sector would be largely scrapped as stated in the NPCSC framework. The original 239,193 individual voters registered in the 2016 Election Committee Subsector elections would be reduced to about 3,200 individuals in the overhauled system, according to the analysis by Hong Kong Free Press.

Chief Executive Carrie Lam also announced that the newly established Candidate Eligibility Review Committee (CERC) to vet the candidates would be formed by a handful of principal officials as the chairperson and members of the committee, without giving much details. There were also concerns on the potential conflict of interest of a sitting Chief Executive who would also be the head of the Committee for Safeguarding National Security could end up advising the CERC on the eligibility of a rival candidate. Political scientist Ma Ngok criticised the screening of the executive branch on the candidates for the legislative branch would mean the government would have "total control on who will be allowed to serve in the legislature. This violates major principles of accountability. It won't be considered as any kind of free election anymore."

The pro-Beijing-dominated Legislative Council voted on the 369 amendments tabled by the government, before passing the bill with 40-to-2 vote on 27 May 2021. The only two opposition legislators, Civic Passion's Cheng Chung-tai said that the overhaul would be a real touchstone of the principle of "Hong Kong people governing Hong Kong", while Pierre Chan for the Medical constituency said that the new electoral system was a "regression in democracy." U.S. Secretary of State Antony Blinken accused the revamp of the electoral system "severely constrains people in Hong Kong from meaningfully participating in their own governance and having their voices heard" and by "decreasing Hong Kong residents' electoral representation will not foster long-term political and social stability for Hong Kong." He vowed that the United States would continue to united speaking out for the human rights and fundamental freedoms guaranteed to the people in Hong Kong with its allies.

== Reactions ==
=== Domestic ===
Chief Executive Carrie Lam supported the NPC decision, stressing the "pressing need" to plug legal loopholes to improve Hong Kong's electoral system ahead of two key elections of Legislative Council and Chief Executive. Legislative Council President Andrew Leung also backed the decision, claiming it would restore normalcy to Hong Kong by establishing a "peaceful and rational LegCo" and minimising unnecessary disputes.

Most prominent pro-Beijing figures welcomed the reform. Former Chief Executive and vice chairman of the National Committee of the Chinese People's Political Consultative Conference (CPPCC) Leung Chun-ying it was necessary to have electoral reform so that the electoral system would be based on the principle of "patriots ruling Hong Kong." Former World Health Organization (WHO) director-general and CPPCC delegate Margaret Chan said she stands by the principle of "patriots ruling Hong Kong" as it was the basis for the "One Country, Two Systems" principle and should not be questioned.

Pro-Beijing politician and former Legislative Council President Jasper Tsang suggested the reform could be done by amending local election laws without amending the Annex I and Annex II of the Basic Law. He said if the reform bypassed the "five-step" procedure set by the NPCSC decision in 2004 which required the Chief Executive to submit a reform proposal to the NPCSC and passed by the two-thirds majority of the Legislative Council, the authority of the Basic Law would be undermined. Non-official convenor of the Executive Council Bernard Chan said the move was a "setback" for Hong Kong's progress on democratic development since 1997.

Major pro-Beijing parties and organisations including the Democratic Alliance for the Betterment and Progress of Hong Kong (DAB), the Hong Kong Federation of Trade Unions (FTU), the Liberal Party, the New People's Party (NPP), the Chinese General Chamber of Commerce (CGCC) and the Hong Kong Federation of Education Workers (HKFEW) and led by National People's Congress Standing Committee (NPCSC) Hong Kong delegate Tam Yiu-chung and Hong Kong Basic Law Committee deputy director Maria Tam set up a cross-party alliance to launch an online petition in support of the reform.

Democratic Party chairman Lo Kin-hei said the electoral changes were "the biggest regression of the system since the handover" and "the authorities will do whatever they want, whenever they want, in a way that was unimaginable before." He criticised the changes to the electoral system that had been in use for the past two decades would narrow the room for the pro-democrats and discourage them from joining future elections. He believed that the vetting mechanism would be a form of political censorship that would ask candidates to start to compete over who would be more loyal to Beijing, instead of thinking of ideas that could make Hong Kong better.

=== International ===
UK Foreign Secretary Dominic Raab said the dilution of elections in Hong Kong was the "latest step by Beijing to hollow out the space for democratic debate in Hong Kong, contrary to the promises made by China itself. He added that "this can only further undermine confidence and trust in China living up to its international responsibilities and legal obligations." In a statement on 13 March, Raab said that "Beijing's decision to impose radical changes to restrict participation in Hong Kong's electoral system constitutes a further clear breach of the legally binding Sino-British Joint Declaration."

US State Department spokesman Ned Price criticized the move as "a direct attack on Hong Kong's autonomy, Hong Kong's freedoms and the democratic processes." US Secretary of State Antony Blinken said the US would continue to "take action against egregious violations of democracy and human rights in Hong Kong." On 17 March, the US sanctioned an additional 24 Chinese and Hong Kong officials over the deep concern with the 11 March NPC decision to unilaterally undermine Hong Kong's electoral system, including NPC vice chair Wang Chen and Hong Kong delegate to the NPCSC Tam Yiu-chung.

The European Union voiced protest against the reform. "If enacted, such reform would have potentially far-reaching negative consequences for democratic principles and democratically elected-representatives in Hong Kong. It would also run counter to previous electoral reforms in Hong Kong and renege on the commitments," the EU Office to Hong Kong and Macau said in a statement. The European Commission and the High Representative noted in an annual report on 12 March that there has been an "alarming political deterioration in Hong Kong." E.U. High Representative Josep Borrell added that "China is consciously dismantling the 'One Country, Two Systems' principle in violation of its international commitments and the Hong Kong Basic Law."

Japanese Foreign Ministry said in a 12 March statement that Beijing's decision "will further undermine the confidence in the 'one country, two systems' framework, as provided for in the Hong Kong Basic Law and the 1984 Sino-British Joint Declaration" and Japan "cannot overlook" the major setback to the city's autonomy.

Foreign ministers in the G7 group of nations expressed "grave concerns" at Beijing's move to "fundamentally erode democratic elements of the electoral system in Hong Kong." The statement also called on "China and the Hong Kong authorities to restore confidence in Hong Kong's political institutions and end the unwarranted oppression of those who promote democratic values and the defense of rights and freedoms."

== See also ==
- Democratic backsliding
- 2021 Hong Kong Election Committee Subsector elections
- 2021 Hong Kong legislative election
- 2022 Hong Kong Chief Executive election
- Public Offices (Candidacy and Taking Up Offices) (Miscellaneous Amendments) Ordinance 2021
- Candidate Eligibility Review Committee
- District Council Eligibility Review Committee
