= District councils of Hong Kong =

Local councils for districts of Hong Kong

District council
- Traditional Chinese: 區議會
- Simplified Chinese: 区议会
Transcriptions
Standard Mandarin
- Hanyu Pinyin: Qūyìhuì
- Wade–Giles: Chʻü¹-i⁴-hui⁴
Yue: Cantonese
- Yale Romanization: Kēui yi wúi
- Jyutping: Keoi1 ji3 wui2

The district councils, formerly district boards until 1999, are the local councils for the 18 districts of Hong Kong.

== History ==
=== Before establishment ===
An early basis for the delivery of local services were the Kaifong associations, set up in 1949. However, by the 1960s, these had ceased to represent local interests, and so, in 1968, the government established the first local administrative structure with the city district offices, which were intended to enable it to mobilise support for its policies and programmes, such as in health and crime-reduction campaigns. An aim was also to monitor the grass roots, following the 1967 riots.

Under the Community Involvement Plan, launched in the early 1970s, Hong Kong and Kowloon were divided into 74 areas, each of around 45,000 people. For each, an 'area committee' of twenty members was then appointed by the city district officers, and was comprised, for the first time, of members from all sectors of the local community, led by an unofficial member of the Legislative Council (Legco). The initial purpose was to help implement the 'Clean Hong Kong' campaign, by distributing publicity material to local people. This was held to be a success.

A next stage in the government's effort to increase local engagement and influence was the setting up, in June 1973, of mutual aid committees (MACs) in high-rise residential buildings. These were described in Legco as "a group of responsible citizens, resident in the same multi-storey building who work together to solve common problems of cleanliness and security." In fact, they were tightly controlled by the government. With government encouragement, the number of such committees increased rapidly in these private buildings, from 1,214 in 1973 to 3,463 in 1980. The scheme was extended to public housing estates, of which 800 had MACs in 1980, as well as factories and in the New Territories.

The next development was the establishment of eight district advisory boards in the districts of the New Territories, starting with Tsuen Wan in 1977. The boards, whose members were appointed, were more formally constituted than the city district boards, charged with advising on local matters, recommending minor district works, and conducting cultural and recreational activities.

=== Establishment to present ===
Then in 1982, under the governorship of Sir Murray MacLehose, the district boards were established under the District Administration Scheme. The aim was to improve co-ordination of government activities in the provision of services and facilities at the district level and the boards initially took over the roles of the district advisory boards.

At first, the boards comprised only appointed members and government officials, but from 1982, a proportion of each was elected. In an attempt to inject a democratic element into the Legislative Council, the government introduced a model where some legislators were elected indirectly by members of the district councils. Twelve legislators were returned by an 'electoral college' of district councillors in 1985. The practice was repeated in 1988 and 1995.

After the HKSAR was established in 1997, as part of the "through train", the district boards became provisional district boards, composed of all the original members of the boards supplemented by others appointed by the chief executive. (Under the British administration, the Governor had refrained from appointing any member.)

Later in early 1999 a bill was passed in the Legislative Council providing mainly for the establishment, composition and functions of the District Councils, which would replace the Provisional District Boards. The 27 ex officio seats of Rural Committees, abolished by the colonial authorities, were reinstated. The government rejected any public survey or referendum on the issue, saying that it had been studying the issue since 1997, and had received 98 favourable submissions. The self-proclaimed pro-democracy camp dubbed the move "a setback to the pace of democracy" because it was a throwback to the colonial era.

In 2010, the government proposed that five legislators be added to district council functional constituencies, and be elected by proportional representation of elected DC members. In a politically controversial deal between the Democratic Party and the Beijing government, this was changed to allow the five seats to be elected by those members of the general electorate who did not otherwise have a functional constituency vote.

Under the district councillor appointment system, 102 district councillors out of 534 were picked by the Chief Executive, while the remainder were democratically elected by voters in each district. The system was abolished in 2013, and the new District Councils after the 2015 election no longer have appointed members.

In 2023, the government proposed to cut the direct elect seats of district councilors from 452 to 88 seats while the total seats cut from 479 to 470 seats. Besides, all district councilors candidate who opt for election must be vetted and passed by the new District Council Eligibility Review Committee. The proposal has been approved by Legislative Council in July 2023.

== Operation ==
=== Functions ===
The councils are mandated to advise the Government on the following:

- matters affecting the well-being of people in the District;
- the provision and use of public facilities and services within the District;
- the adequacy and priorities of Government programmes for the District;
- the use of public funds allocated to the District for local public works and community activities; and

District councils also undertake the following within the respective districts with its available funds allocated by the government:

- environmental improvements;
- the promotion of recreational and cultural activities; and
- community activities

=== Councils ===
Map of district councils

There is a district council for each of the following eighteen districts. The number in parentheses corresponds to the number shown on the map at the right.

No.	District	Region	Seats	Population (2021)
1	Central and Western	Hong Kong Island	20	235,953
2	Eastern	Hong Kong Island	30	529,603
3	Southern	Hong Kong Island	20	263,278
4	Wan Chai	Hong Kong Island	10	166,695
5	Kowloon City	Kowloon	20	410,634
6	Kwun Tong	Kowloon	40	673,166
7	Sham Shui Po	Kowloon	20	431,090
8	Wong Tai Sin	Kowloon	20	406,802
9	Yau Tsim Mong	Kowloon	20	310,647
10	Islands	New Territories	18	185,282
11	Kwai Tsing	New Territories	32	495,798
12	North	New Territories	24	309,631
13	Sai Kung	New Territories	32	489,037
14	Sha Tin	New Territories	42	692,806
15	Tai Po	New Territories	22	316,470
16	Tsuen Wan	New Territories	22	320,094
17	Tuen Mun	New Territories	32	506,879
18	Yuen Long	New Territories	46	668,080

=== Composition ===
Changes to the composition of the District Councils: 2019 election (479 seats): Directly elected (452); Ex-officio (Chairmen of Rural Committee) (27); 2023 election (470 seats): Directly elected (88); Ex-officio (Chairmen of Rural Committee) (27); Indirectly elected (Electoral College of "Three Committees") (176); Appointed (179)

Following revamp of District Councils announced by the Government in 2023, the number of the elected seats is significantly reduced to around 20%, while each of the 40 per cent of the seats will be returned by indirect elections and by revived government's appointment. Single non-transferable vote replaced "first past the post" system, as previously implemented in the 2021 reform.

Before the drastic change, there were a total of 479 district council members in the sixth District Councils. Except 27 ex-officio seats occupied by Chairmen of Rural Committees in the New Territories, all were returned by direct election.

District Councils are chaired by District Officers starting from 2024, and had been the case in the first three years of District Boards (name of District Councils before handover), i.e. between 1982 and 1985. Since 1985 and until 2023 chairmen of District Boards are elected from amongst the members.

Election	Term of office	Elected	Ex-officio		Electoral College (Note: Indirectly elected by members of Area Committees, District Fight Crime Committees, and District Fire Safety Committees)	Appointed		Overall
Election	Term of office	Elected	Rural Committee	Urban Council	Electoral College	Non- official	Official	Overall
1982	1982/4/1–85/3/31	132	27	30	—	134	167	490
1985	1985/4/1–88/3/31	237	27	30	—	132	—	426
1988	1988/4/1–91/3/31	264	27	30	—	141	—	462
1991	1991/4/1–94/9/30	274	27	—	—	140	—	441
1994	1994/10/1–97/6/30	346	27	—	—	—	—	373
(Prov.)	1997/7/1–99/12/31	—	—	—	—	469 (Note: Including all 373 councillors before handover and 95 newly appointed councillors)	—	469
1999	2000/1/1–03/12/31	390	27	—	—	102	—	519
2003	2004/1/1–07/12/31	400	27	—	—	102	—	529
2007	2008/1/1–11/12/31	405	27	—	—	102	—	534
2011	2012/1/1–15/12/31	412	27	—	—	68	—	507
2015	2016/1/1–19/12/31	431	27	—	—	—	—	458
2019	2020/1/1–23/12/31	452	27	—	—	—	—	479
2023	2024/1/1–	88	27	—	176	179	—	470

Source: Review of the Roles, Functions and Composition

=== Political make-up of the councils ===
As of 2 January 2020:

Council/ Party	CW	WC	E	S	YTM	SSP	KC	WTS	KT	TW	TM	YL	N	TP	SK	ST	KWT	I	TOTAL
Democratic	7		4	7	4	2	10	6	9	3	7	7	5			6	12	1	90
Civic			5	1	1	4		2	4	3						7	3	2	32
ND										2			3	4	9	1			19
ADPL						11		3			5								19
CST																8			8
TCHD										1	2	4							7
Labour			2							1	2				1	1			7
CGPLTKO															6				6
CM					5														5
CA														4	1				5
TMCN											4								4
NWSC												1					3		4
TSWC												4							4
TPDA														3					3
VSA	2	1																	3
Civ Passion												1		1					2
DA												2							2
DTW										2									2
TKOP															2				2
LSD			1													1			2
SKC															2				2
TKOS															2				2
PP								1											1
EHK											1								1
TYP																	1		1
LMCG											1								1
CSWWF						1													1
CKWEF			1																1
TWCN										1									1
KEC									1										1
SK							1												1
CAP									1										1
TSWLPU												1							1
Ind & others	5	8	19	7	7	4	4	13	13	3	6	13	7	7	3	16	8	4	147
Pro-democrats	14	9	32	15	17	22	15	25	28	16	28	33	15	19	26	40	27	7	388
DAB			1		1	2	4		6		1		1			1	3	1	21
FTU			1						1	1	1		1						5
Liberal	1	1	1	1			1												5
BPA							3				1					1			5
FPHE									2	1									3
Roundtable											1						1		2
Ind & others		3		1	2		2		3	2		12	5	2	5		1	10	48
Pro-Beijing	1	4	3	2	3	2	10	0	12	4	4	12	7	2	5	2	5	11	89
Others						1				1									2
Vacant																			
Councillors	15	13	35	17	20	25	25	25	40	21	32	45	22	21	31	42	32	18	479

== Independence ==
The party affiliations and politics in the Legislative Council can be echoed in the district councils, who have sometimes been accused of slavishly supporting the government. Professor Li Pang-kwong, of Lingnan University, says that the problematic framework of the councils, being under the Home Affairs Bureau, has led them to work too closely with the government. He cites the example of the "copy and paste" Queen's Pier motions passed by thirteen councils to support government decisions as a rubber-stamp, and a clear sign that councils lacked independence. Li recalled a similar government "consultation" on universal suffrage in 2007, in which two-thirds of the councils passed a vote in support of its position. After it was revealed that the government was behind the concerted district councils' motions in 2008 supporting the relocation of Queen's Pier, Albert Ho condemned the government for tampering with district councils to "create public opinion", and for turning district officers into propagandists.

== Elections ==
=== 1999 District council elections ===
In 1999, Tung Chee Hwa appointed 100 members to the district councils. These included 41 from various political parties, namely the Liberal Party, the Democratic Alliance for the Betterment and Progress of Hong Kong (DAB), and the Hong Kong Progressive Alliance. No democrats were appointed.

=== 2003 District council elections ===
In 2003, Tung appointed 21 political party appointees to the district councils to dilute the influence of the pan-democrats as follows:

- eight members of the Liberal Party
- six members of the DAB
- six members from the Progressive Alliance
- one from the New Century Forum

Professor of politics and sociology at Lingnan University, Dr. Li Pang-kwong said "As in the past, most of the appointees were pro-government or persons without a clear political stance... ensur[ing] that no district council is in the hands of the democrats." A spokesman for the democrats said the appointees "will have an unfair advantage in that they are getting financial support from the government which will help them run for office in future elections." After this election, this election would abolish the appointed members of the Hong Kong district councils.

=== 2007 District council elections ===
In December 2007, Donald Tsang named 27 government-appointed council members.

- 13 members of the Liberal Party
- 11 members of the DAB
- three members from the Federation of Trade Unions

Tsang was criticised for not appointing a single member of the pan-democrats in either 2003 or 2007.

=== 2011 District council elections ===
After the election, Donald Tsang appointed 68 members, none of them from the pan-democrat camp.

== See also ==
- Districts of Hong Kong
- District Officer (Hong Kong)
- Legislative Council of Hong Kong
- Politics of Hong Kong
- District Council Eligibility Review Committee
