= Home Affairs Department =

Department of the Hong Kong Government

- 民政事務總署

Agency overview
- Formed: May 1968; 58 years ago
- Jurisdiction: Hong Kong
- Headquarters: 29/F, Southorn Centre, 130 Hennessy Road, Wan Chai, Hong Kong
- Employees: 1,823 (March 2008)
- Annual budget: 1,547.3 m HKD (2008-09)
- Agency executive: Mrs Alice Cheung, JP, Director of Home Affairs
- Parent agency: Home and Youth Affairs Bureau
- Website: www.had.gov.hk

Home Affairs Department
- Traditional Chinese: 民政事務總署
- Simplified Chinese: 民政事务总署
Transcriptions
Standard Mandarin
- Hanyu Pinyin: Mínzhèn Shìwù Zǒngshǔ
Yue: Cantonese
- Yale Romanization: Màhnjing Sihmouh Júngchyúh
- Jyutping: Man4zing3 Si6mou6 Zung2cyu5
- IPA: [mɐn˩.tsɪŋ˧ si˨.mɔw˨ tsʊŋ˧˥.tsʰy˩˧]

The Home Affairs Department is an executive agency in the government of Hong Kong responsible for internal affairs of the territory. It reports to the Home and Youth Affairs Bureau, headed by the Secretary for Home Affairs.

== Purpose ==
The department is responsible for the District Administration Scheme, community building and community involvement activities, minor environmental improvement projects and minor local public works, and the licensing of hotels and guesthouses, bedspace apartments and clubs. It promotes the concept of effective building management and works closely with other government departments to consistently improve the standard of building management in Hong Kong. It monitors the provision of new arrival services and identifies measures to meet the needs of new arrivals. It also disseminates information relating to and, where necessary, promotes the public's understanding of major government policies, strategies and development plans; and collects and assesses public opinion on relevant issues affecting the community. These responsibilities are discharged primarily through the 18 district offices covering the whole of Hong Kong.

== History ==
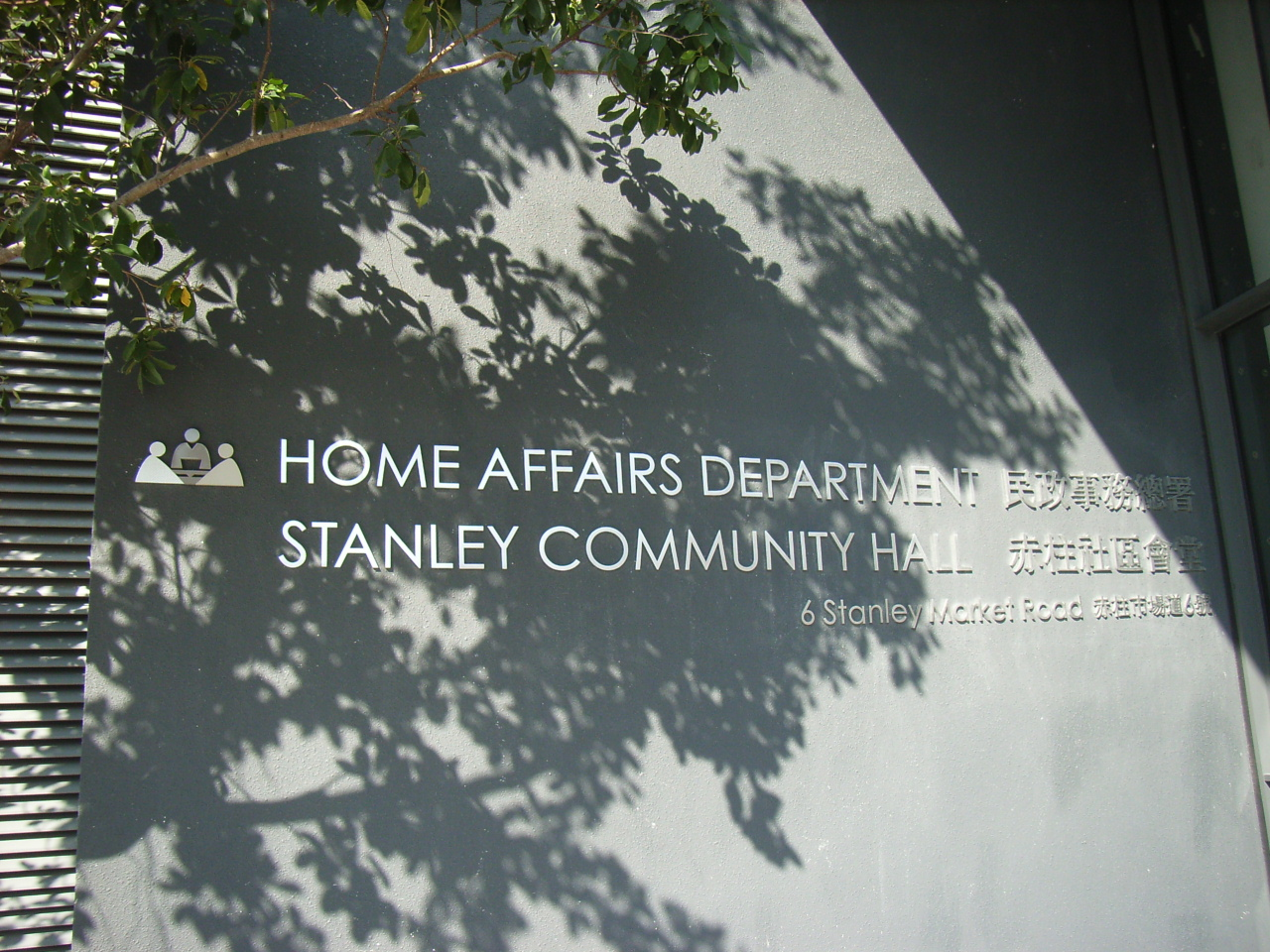
An office in Stanley

For a long time the department was the only channel of communication between the people and the government. It used to be headed by the Registrar General, who was also called the 'Protector of the Chinese'. Fung-Chi Au (Chinese: 區鳳墀; Cantonese Yale: Āu Fuhng Chìh; 1847–1914), who was the teacher of Chinese literature for Sun Yat-sen, was the Secretary of the Department of Chinese Affairs (Chinese: 華民政務司署總書記; Cantonese Yale: Wàh'màhn Jingmouh Sīchyúh Júngsyūgei). In 1913 the department was called the Secretariat for Chinese Affairs. After the 1967 riots, the colonial government introduced the City District Officer Scheme (民政主任) "as the first sign of reaching out to the ordinary people" in Hong Kong society. It was renamed the Home Affairs Department in 1971 because, according to the government, the department dealt not only with matters relating to the Chinese. The first Secretary for Home Affairs was Donald Luddington.

In February 2021, the Home Affairs Department announced that pro-democracy district council members would be excluded from government-linked organizations that focus on neighborhood issues. In March 2021, Ramon Yuen said that officials from the department had selectively trimmed his discussion about a pro-democracy protest from the official record.

== Area committees ==
Area committees were formed in districts in 1972 primarily to promote public participation in the Keep Hong Kong Clean Campaign and Fight Violent Crime Campaign. Nowadays, the functions of area committees are to encourage public participation in district affairs, to advise and assist in the organisation of community involvement activities and the implementation of government-sponsored initiatives, and advise on issues of a localised nature affecting the area. Throughout the years, area committees have played an important role in the districts and in providing a link between the local community and the district office. Area committee members are appointed by the Director of Home Affairs and are drawn from a wide spectrum of the community including district council members of the area concerned. At present, there are 70 area committees throughout Hong Kong. In general, each area committee serves an area with a population, including residents and mobile population (workers, shoppers, tourists etc.), of about 80,000 to 100,000.

== Mutual Aid Committees ==
A mutual aid committee is a voluntary body formed by the residents of a building. Mutual aid committees were promoted initially in private multi-storey buildings, and quickly extended to public housing estates, industrial buildings, temporary housing and squatter areas. As at March 31, 2004, there were 3,103 mutual aid committees throughout Hong Kong Island, Kowloon and the New Territories. The primary aims of a mutual aid committee are to promote a sense of friendliness, mutual help and responsibility among members, and to promote better security, a better environment and, generally, more effective management within the building. These committees provide a channel of two-way communication between the Government and the residents on matters affecting the well-being of the individual and the community and also provide opportunities for residents to participate in community activities.

== Owners' Corporation ==
An Owners' Corporation is a legal entity formed under the Building Management Ordinance by the owners of a private building. Owners' corporations are statutory bodies vested with certain legal powers to facilitate the management of a building. At the end of March 2004, there were 7,294 owners' corporations throughout Hong Kong, among which 5,537 were formed with the assistance of the district offices.

== See also ==
- Government departments and agencies in Hong Kong
- District Officer (Hong Kong)
- District Council of Hong Kong
