= Candidate Eligibility Review Committee =

Government statutory committee in Hong Kong

- Emblem of the Hong Kong SAR

Agency overview
- Formed: 6 July 2021; 5 years ago

Jurisdictional structure
- Legal jurisdiction: Hong Kong
- Constituting instrument: Basic Law of Hong Kong Annexes I and II

Operational structure
- Agency executive: Eric Chan, Chief Secretary for Administration

Candidate Eligibility Review Committee (Chinese: 候選人資格審查委員會) is a government statutory committee in Hong Kong, which is responsible for accessing and validating the eligibility of electoral candidate of the chief executive, the Legislative Council and the Election Committee. The committee was established in 2021 as required by the Basic Law after March 30, 2021.

Decisions made by the committee on National Security's review advice are not subject to any judicial proceedings.

All electoral candidates of the chief executive, the Legislative Council and the Election Committee must be approved by the committee since June 2021.

Members of the Candidate Eligibility Review Committee include a chairperson, 2 to 4 official members, and 1 to 3 non-official members. The committee members (including the chairperson) are appointed by the chief executive by notice published in the Hong Kong Government Gazette.

== See also ==
- 2021 Hong Kong electoral changes
- Public Offices (Candidacy and Taking Up Offices) (Miscellaneous Amendments) Ordinance 2021
- District Council Eligibility Review Committee

== Related Documents (In English) ==
- "Basic Law - Annex and Instrument - Annex I (EN)". Hong Kong Special Administrative Region Government. Archived from the original on 2022-06-19.
- "Basic Law - Annex and Instrument - Annex II (EN)". Hong Kong Special Administrative Region Government. Archived from the original on 2022-07-01.

== Related Documents (In Chinese) ==
- "候選人資格審查流程圖" (PDF). 政制及內地事務局. 2021. Archived from the original (PDF) on 2021-04-24.
- "立法會內務委員會《全國人民代表大會關於完善香港特別行政區選舉制度的決定》小組委員會" (PDF). 立法會. 2021. Archived from the original (PDF) on 2021-04-24.
- "《2021年完善選舉制度(綜合修訂)條例草案》法律事務部報告" (PDF). 立法會. 2021. Archived from the original (PDF) on 2021-04-24.
- 陳光熹 (2021). "《漫話香港新選舉制度》" (PDF). 香港開明書店. Archived from the original (PDF) on 2021-04-24.
- "候選人資格審查流程圖" (PDF). 文匯報. 2021. Archived from the original (PDF) on 2021-04-24.
- "候選人資格審查委員會運作機制" (PDF). 文匯報. 2021. Archived from the original (PDF) on 2021-04-24.
- "《2021年完善選舉制度（綜合修訂）條例草案》" (PDF). 香港政府憲報. 2021. Archived from the original (PDF) on 2021-04-24.
- "全國人民代表大會關於完善香港特別行政區選舉制度的決定" (PDF). 基本法推廣督導委員會. 2021. Archived from the original (PDF) on 2021-04-24.
- "完善選舉制度確保香港繁榮和穩定" (PDF). 律政司. 2021. Archived from the original (PDF) on 2021-04-24.
- "完善選舉制度 落實愛國者治港" (PDF). 政府新聞處. 2021. Archived from the original (PDF) on 2021-04-24.
- "全國人大關於完善香港特別行政區選舉制度的決定有關情況發佈會" (PDF). 國務院港澳事務辦公室. 2021. Archived from the original (PDF) on 2021-04-24.
- "立法會參考資料摘要" (PDF). 政制及內地事務局. 2021. Archived from the original (PDF) on 2021-04-24.
- "選舉委員會界別分組的席位分佈及產生方法" (PDF). 政制及內地事務局. 2021. Archived from the original (PDF) on 2021-04-24.
- "《2021年公職(參選及任職)(雜項修訂)條例草案》委員會報告" (PDF). 立法會. 2021. Archived from the original (PDF) on 2021-04-24.
- "香港資訊" (PDF). 香港特别行政區政府駐上海經濟貿易辦事處. 2021. Archived from the original (PDF) on 2021-04-24.
