= Hong Kong delegation to the National People's Congress =

Hong Kong Special Administrative Region Delegation to the National People's Congress
- 香港特别行政区全国人民代表大会代表
- Delegation for the National People's Congress
- Location of the Hong Kong Special Administrative Region
- Electoral unit: Hong Kong Special Administrative Region
- Number of electors: 1,989 (members of the election conference)
- Population: 7,413,070

Current Delegation
- Created: 1 July 1997
- Seats: 36
- Head of delegation: Ma Fung-kwok
- Created from: Guangdong delegation
- Election method: Elected by an election conference

The Hong Kong Special Administrative Region delegation to the National People's Congress are the deputies from the Hong Kong Special Administrative Region to the National People's Congress (NPC), the highest organ of state power of the People's Republic of China. The Hong Kong deputies to the National People's Congress account for 1.2% of the total number of deputies to the National People's Congress.

During the British Hong Kong period, the Hong Kong deputies to the NPC from the 1st to the 8th sessions were elected indirectly by the Guangdong Provincial People's Congress from among its Hong Kong members. According to the Hong Kong Basic Law, all Hong Kong deputies to the NPC must be Chinese citizens residing in Hong Kong. Another duty they have is to participate in the election of the chief executive as members of the Election Committee. Currently, NPC deputies from Hong Kong is elected by Chinese citizens who were deputies to the previous NPC, members of the National Committee of the Chinese People's Political Consultative Conference (CPPCC), and members of the Election Committee, in accordance with the election procedures established by the NPC for that term.

== History ==
The history of Hong Kong deputies to the National People's Congress began with the 1st National People's Congress in 1954, and from then until the 8th National People's Congress, the deputies were all from the Guangdong Provincial People's Congress. The number of deputies increased from two to ten to twenty in the 1st to 3rd National People's Congresses (1954 to 1975). After Hong Kong's handover to China, starting with the 9th National People's Congress in 1998, Hong Kong's National People's Congress deputies no longer participated as part of the Guangdong delegation, but as the Hong Kong Special Administrative Region delegation.

== Election method ==
Before each NPC term, the National People's Congress Election Conference of the Hong Kong Special Administrative Region is formed. It then accepts applications from Hong Kong residents who are Chinese citizens aged 18 or above to run for election. Candidates must have at least 10 members of the Election Conference complete their nomination forms to be registered as delegates. Election Conference members can also register. Finally, the Election Conference elects 36 official delegates from among the delegates.

=== Composition of previous election conferences ===
The election conference for the 9th National People's Congress deputies of Hong Kong was composed of Chinese citizens who were members of the selection committee for the first government of Hong Kong as stipulated in the "Decision of the National People's Congress on the Method for the Formation of the First Government and Legislative Council of the Hong Kong Special Administrative Region", as well as Chinese citizens who were members of the 8th National Committee of the Chinese People's Political Consultative Conference and members of the Provisional Legislative Council of Hong Kong who were not members of the selection committee, except for those who indicated that they did not wish to participate.

The election conference for the 10th National People's Congress deputies of Hong Kong was composed of those who had participated in the election conference for the 9th National People's Congress deputies of Hong Kong, as well as Chinese citizens who were members of the 9th National Committee of the Chinese People's Political Consultative Conference and members of the Election Committee for the second chief executive of Hong Kong, but who were not the aforementioned persons. However, those who indicated that they did not wish to participate were excluded. The chief executive of Hong Kong was a member of the election conference for the 10th National People's Congress deputies of Hong Kong. The election conference for the 11th National People's Congress deputies of Hong Kong was composed of those who had participated in the election conference for the 10th National People's Congress deputies of Hong Kong, as well as Chinese citizens who were members of the 10th National Committee of the Chinese People's Political Consultative Conference and members of the Election Committee for the 3rd chief executive of Hong Kong, but not those who indicated that they did not wish to participate. The chief executive of Hong Kong was a member of the election conference for the 11th National People's Congress deputies of Hong Kong.

The election conference for the 12th National People's Congress deputies of Hong Kong was composed of those who had participated in the election conference for the 11th National People's Congress deputies of Hong Kong, as well as Chinese citizens who were members of the 11th National Committee of the Chinese People's Political Consultative Conference and members of the Election Committee for the 4th chief executive of Hong Kong, but not those who indicated that they did not wish to participate. The chief executive of Hong Kong was a member of the election conference for the 12th National People's Congress deputies of Hong Kong. In short, the electorate for this election meeting consists of Chinese citizens who participated in the previous election meeting for Hong Kong deputies to the National People's Congress, the previous members of the National Committee of the Chinese People's Political Consultative Conference from Hong Kong, and the current chief executive of Hong Kong and members of his Election Committee.

In March 2022, the National People's Congress adopted the "Methods for Electing Deputies to the 14th National People's Congress from Hong Kong of the People's Republic of China". The election conference was composed of Chinese citizens who were the current chief executive of Hong Kong and members of the Election Committee, except for those who indicated that they did not wish to participate. Members of the previous election conference would not automatically become members of the next election conference. The decision was said to be related to "improving the electoral system".

=== Election work ===
According to Article 60 of the Constitution, the election of deputies to the next National People's Congress (NPC) must be completed two months before the expiration of each NPC term, and the NPC Standing Committee shall preside over the election. In March, one year before the expiration of each NPC term, the NPC adopts a decision and procedure concerning the number of deputies to the next NPC and the election process—the "Procedures for the Election of Deputies to the XXth National People's Congress from the Hong Kong Special Administrative Region of the People's Republic of China," stipulating that deputies to the next NPC should be elected in January of the year in which the next NPC term begins. The NPC and its Standing Committee attach great importance to the election of NPC deputies from Hong Kong. Starting in the first half of the year before the expiration of each NPC term, the NPC Standing Committee begins preparations for the election work in accordance with the law. From July to September of the same year, the General Office of the NPC Standing Committee, in accordance with the election procedures, distributes registration forms for members of the election conference in Hong Kong, inquiring whether they are eligible to participate in the election conference and accepting registration. From August to October, the NPC Standing Committee, based on the qualified voters and those who agree to participate, approves and publishes the list of members of the election conference for deputies to the next National People's Congress from Hong Kong, thus establishing the election conference. In November, the election conference officially began its work.

According to the provisions of the election procedure, the work of the election meeting is roughly divided into three stages. In the first stage, the first plenary meeting of the election conference was held. As is customary, the vice chairman and secretary-general of the Standing Committee of the National People's Congress (who is conventionally responsible for the election of Hong Kong deputies to the National People's Congress) will preside over the first plenary meeting and elect several members of the election conference to form the presidium. Subsequent election conferences will be presided over by the presidium. The main responsibilities of the presidium include: determining the election date; determining the nomination time for candidates; announcing the list of candidates; proposing the candidates for chief scrutineer and scrutineers, which will be approved by the election conference; announcing the election results; accepting complaints related to the election of deputies and forwarding them to the Credentials Committee of the Standing Committee of the National People's Congress for handling, etc. The Presidium then held its first meeting, electing one chief executive chairman from among its members. Subsequent Presidium meetings will be chaired by the chief executive chairman. As is customary, the chief executive chairman is the then chief executive of Hong Kong. The Presidium meetings will determine the nomination period for candidates for Hong Kong deputies to the National People's Congress (generally between November and December) and the Presidium's spokesperson.

In the second stage, members of the election conference nominate "representative candidates" and confirm "official representative candidates" in accordance with the law. Candidates must be nominated jointly by at least ten members of the election conference, and each member may not jointly nominate more than thirty-six candidates. Therefore, before the nomination period for Hong Kong deputies to the National People's Congress, those intending to run must obtain, fill out, and return a candidate registration form, attaching nomination letters from at least ten members of the election conference to qualify for the election and become representative candidates. After the nomination period, the presidium holds a second meeting to compile and publish the list and brief introductions of representative candidates, distributing the list and introductions to all members of the election conference. In the past, if there were a large number of candidates, a preliminary election would be held, and those who received the most votes would become “official candidates”. Since the ninth session, the election of Hong Kong deputies to the National People's Congress has been conducted in accordance with the principle of differential election, that is, the number of candidates must be one-fifth to one-half more than the number of seats to be filled. If the number of candidates exceeds one-half, they must all go through a preliminary election to become official candidates. In the 10th election of Hong Kong deputies to the National People's Congress in 2002, there were 78 candidates from Hong Kong, which was more than one-half of the number of Hong Kong deputies to be filled. Finally, 54 “official candidates” were preliminarily elected.

In the third stage, the second plenary session of the election conference is held to appoint a chief scrutineer and several scrutineers. Voting takes place using a full-vote system, where members of the election conference can cast a maximum of thirty-six votes for different official candidates (votes with fewer than thirty-six votes are still valid). After voting, the chief scrutineer reports the vote count to the presidium of the election conference. The presidium holds its third meeting, deciding to issue a public announcement of the election results and submit a report on the results to the Credentials Committee of the Standing Committee of the National People's Congress. Generally, if there are no ties, the 36 official candidates with the most votes become Hong Kong deputies to the National People's Congress, while those who lose after this stage can still become alternate deputies if they receive at least one-third of the total votes.

The specific arrangements for the second and third phases will be studied and decided by the Presidium after its formation, and an announcement will be issued. The Standing Committee of the National People's Congress will confirm the qualifications of the deputies and publish the list of deputies based on the report submitted by the Credentials Committee.

== List of deputies ==
=== Hong Kong deputies of the Guangdong delegation to the National People's Congress ===
Election	NPC session	Deputies	Number of delegates	Ref.
1954	1st	Xu Simin, Zhang Zhennan	2	
1959	2nd	Zhuang Shiping, Zheng Tieru	2	
1964	3rd	Zhuang Shiping, Zheng Tieru	2	
1975	4th	Li Jusheng, Zheng Tieru (deceased after being elected), Fei Yimin, Wang Kuancheng, Tang Bingda, Zhuang Shiping, Li Song, Shi Hui, Wu Kangmin, Yang Guang, Guo Tianhai, Su You, Zhang Quan, Huang Yanfang, Guo Zengkai (by-election)	14	
1978	5th	Li Jusheng, Fei Yimin, Wang Kuancheng, Tang Bingda, Zhuang Shiping, Li Song, Shi Hui, Wu Kangmin, Yang Guang, Lu Dajian, Su You, Zhang Quan, Huang Yanfang, Guo Zengkai, Hu Jiu, Fang Shangui	16	
1983	6th	Fang Shangui, Shi Hui, Zhuang Shiping, Tang Bingda, Li Jusheng, Wu Kangmin, Lu Dajian, Fei Yimin, Yang Guang, Huang Yanfang, Tang Zhian, Qin Hui, Chen Zhigui, Li Liansheng, Chen Hong, Liang Shen	16	
1988	7th	Fang Shangui, Wang Mingquan, Li Liansheng, Wu Kangmin, Chen Youqing, Chen Hong, Xu Jiatun (removed from office), Tang Bingda, Fok Ying-tung, Xu Shixiong, Tang Zhian, Lu Dajian, Huang Guanghan, Liao Yaozhu, Zhang Jianhua, Fei Yimin (died in office), Zheng Yaotang, Zeng Decheng (by-election), Zeng Xianzi (by-election), Zhou Nan (by-election)	16	
1993	8th	Wang Mingang, Li Liansheng, Li Weiting, Li Zetian, Wu Kangmin, He Yaodi, Wang Mingquan, Zhou Nan, Tang Zhian, Wei Jishun, Lu Dajian, Lu Daquan, Xu Shixiong, Chen Yongqi, Chen Youqing, Chen Hong, Huang Guanghan, Huang Jianli, Huang Diyan, Liang Aishi, Zeng Decheng, Zeng Xianzi, Cai Weiheng, Liao Yaozhu (died during his tenure), Zheng Yaotang, Xue Fengxuan, Huo Yingdong, Jian Fuyi	28	

=== Hong Kong Special Administrative Region Delegation to the National People's Congress ===
Election	NPC session	Deputies	Number of delegates	Ref.
1997	9th	Robin Chan, Chan Wing-kee, Cheng Yiu-tong, Rita Fan Hsu Lai-tai, Fei Fih, Jiang Enzhu, Kan Fook-yee, Priscilla Lau Pui-king, Lee Chark-tim, Joseph Lee Chung-tak, Allen Lee Peng-fei, Li Lin-sang, Li Weiting, Liu Lit-for, Lo Chung-hing, Lo Suk-ching, Luk Tak-kim, Ma Lik, Ng Ching-fai, Ng Hong-mun, Ngai Shiu-kit, Sik Chi-wai, Victor Sit Fung-shuen, Maria Tam Wai-chu, Tsang Hin-chi, Tsang Tak-sing, Tso Wung-wai, Carson Wen Ka-shuen, Wong Kong-hon, Peter Wong Man-kong, Wong Po-yan, Wilfred Wong Ying-wai, Philip Wong Yu-hong, Raymond Wu Wai-yung, Yeung Yiu-chung, Yuen Mo	36	
2002	10th	Robin Chan, Cheng Yiu-tong, David Chu Yu-lin, Rita Fan Hsu Lai-tai, Fei Fih, Ip Kwok-him, Kan Fook-yee, Ko Po-ling, Lam Kwong-siu, Priscilla Lau Pui-king, Joseph Lee Chung-tak, Allen Lee Peng-fei, Lee Chark-tim, Lee Lin-sang, Sophie Leung Lau Yau-fun, Lo Suk-ching, Ma Fung-kwok, Ma Lik, Ng Ching-fai, Ng Hong-mun, Ng Leung-sing, Sik Chi-wai, Victor Sit Fung-shuen, Maria Tam Wai-chu, Tsang Hin-chi, Tsang Tak-sing, Tso Wung-wai, Wang Rudeng, Carson Wen Ka-shuen, Wong Kwok-kin, Peter Wong Man-kong, Philip Wong Yu-hong, Wilfred Wong Ying-wai, Raymond Wu Wai-yung, Yeung Yiu-chung, Yuen Mo	36	
2008	11th	Laura Cha Shih May-lung, Bernard Charnwut Chan, Cheng Yiu-tong, Choy So-yuk, Rita Fan Hsu Lai-tai, Fei Fih, Ian Fok Chun-wan, Raymond Ho Chung-tai, Ip Kwok-him, Ko Po-ling, Dennis Lam Shun-chiu, Fanny Law Fan Chiu-fun, Joseph Lee Chung-tak, Miriam Lau Kin-yee, Priscilla Lau Pui-king, Sophie Leung Lau Yau-fun, Leung Ping-chung, Martin Liao Cheung-kong, Lo Shun-on, Lo Suk-ching, Tim Lui Tim-leung, Ma Fung-kwok, Ma Ho-fai, Ng Ching-fai, Ng Leung-sing, Maria Tam Wai-chu, Michael Tien Puk-sun, Tso Wung-wai, Wang Rudeng, Carson Wen Ka-shuen, Wong Kwok-kin, Peter Wong Man-kong, Wilfred Wong Ying-wai, Wong Yuk-shan, Yeung Yiu-chung, Yuen Mo	36	
2012	12th	Cai Yi, Laura Cha Shih May-lung, Bernard Charnwut Chan, Bunny Chan Chung-bun, Chan Yung, Cheng Yiu-tong, Cheung Ming-man, Choy So-yuk, Rita Fan Hsu Lai-tai, Herman Hu Shao-ming, Ian Fok Chun-wan, Ip Kwok-him, Dennis Lam Shun-chiu, Miriam Lau Kin-yee, Priscilla Lau Pui-king, Fanny Law Fan Chiu-fun, Ambrose Lee Siu-kwong, Sophie Leung Lau Yau-fun, Li Yinquan, Martin Liao Cheung-kong, Lo Shui-on, Tim Lui Tim-leung, Ma Fung-kwok, Ma Ho-fai, Ng Chau-pei, Ng Leung-sing, Ngan Po-ling, Maria Tam Wai-chu, Michael Tien Puk-sun, Peter Wong Man-kong, Wong Ting-chung, David Wong Yau-kar, Wong Yuk-shan, Andrew Yao Cho-fai, Yeung Yiu-chung, Zhang Tiefu	36	
2017	13th	Cai Yi, Bernard Charnwut Chan, Bunny Chan Chung-bun, Maggie Chan Man-ki, Chan Yung, Cheng Yiu-tong, Thomas Cheung Tsun-yung, Choy So-yuk, Nancy Chu Ip Yuk-yu, Ian Fok Chun-wan, Witman Hung, Ip Kwok-him, Cally Kwong Mei-wan, Lam Lung-on, Dennis Lam Shun-chiu, Vincent Marshall Lee Kwan-ho, Tommy Li Ying-sang, Li Yinquan, Martin Liao Cheung-kong, Lo Sui-on, Lui Tim-leung, Ma Fung-kwok, Ma Ho-fai, Ng Chau-pei, Ng Leung-sing, Pauline Ngan Po-ling, Raymond Tam Chi-yuen, Tam Yiu-chung, Henry Tan, Michael Tien Puk-sun, Peter Wong Man-kong, Wong Ting-chung, David Wong Yau-kar, Wong Yuk-shan, Andrew Yao Cho-fai	36	
2022	14th	Ginny Man Wing-yee. Chu Lap-wai Nancy Chu Ip Yuk-yu, Jimmy Ng Wing-ka, Stanley Ng Chau-pei, Li Yinquan, Lee Shing-put, Starry Lee Wai-king, Tommy Li Ying-sang, Wilson Shum Ho-kit, Hendrick Sin, Gordon Lam Chi-wing, Dennis Lam Shun-chiu, Andrew Yao Cho-fai, Herman Hu Shao-ming, Ling Yu-shih, Kelvin Sun Wei-yung, Eileen Tsui Li, Ma Fung-kwok, Priscilla Leung Mei-fun, Frank Chan Fan, Brave Chan Yung, Rock Chen Chung-nin, Ronick Chan Chun-ying, Bunny Chan Chung-bun, Maggie Chan Man-ki, Nicholas Chan Hiu-fung, Wong Ping-fan, Kennedy Wong Ying-ho, Wong Kam-leung, Allen Yeung Tak-bun, Tim Lui Tim-leung, George Lau Ka-keung, Henry Cai Yi, Kenneth Fok Kai-kong, Cally Kwong Mei-wan	36	

=== Hong Kong deputies to the Standing Committee of the National People's Congress ===
- 5th session: Fei Yi-ming (elected in 1980 at the third session of the 5th National People's Congress)
- 6th session: Fei Yi-ming
- 7th session: Henry Fok, Xu Jiatun (removed from office in 1991), and Zhou Nan (elected in 1991 at the fourth session of the 7th National People's Congress).
- 8th session: Zhou Nan, Tsang Hin-chi (By-election at the second session of the 8th National People's Congress in 1994)
- 9th session: Tsang Hin-chi
- 10th session: Tsang Hin-chi
- 11th session: Rita Fan
- 12th session: Rita Fan
- 13th session: Tam Yiu-chung
- 14th session: Starry Lee
