= 2012 National People's Congress election in Hong Kong =

- 19 December 2012

36 Hong Kong deputies to National People's Congress
- Registered: 1,621
- Turnout: 91.80%
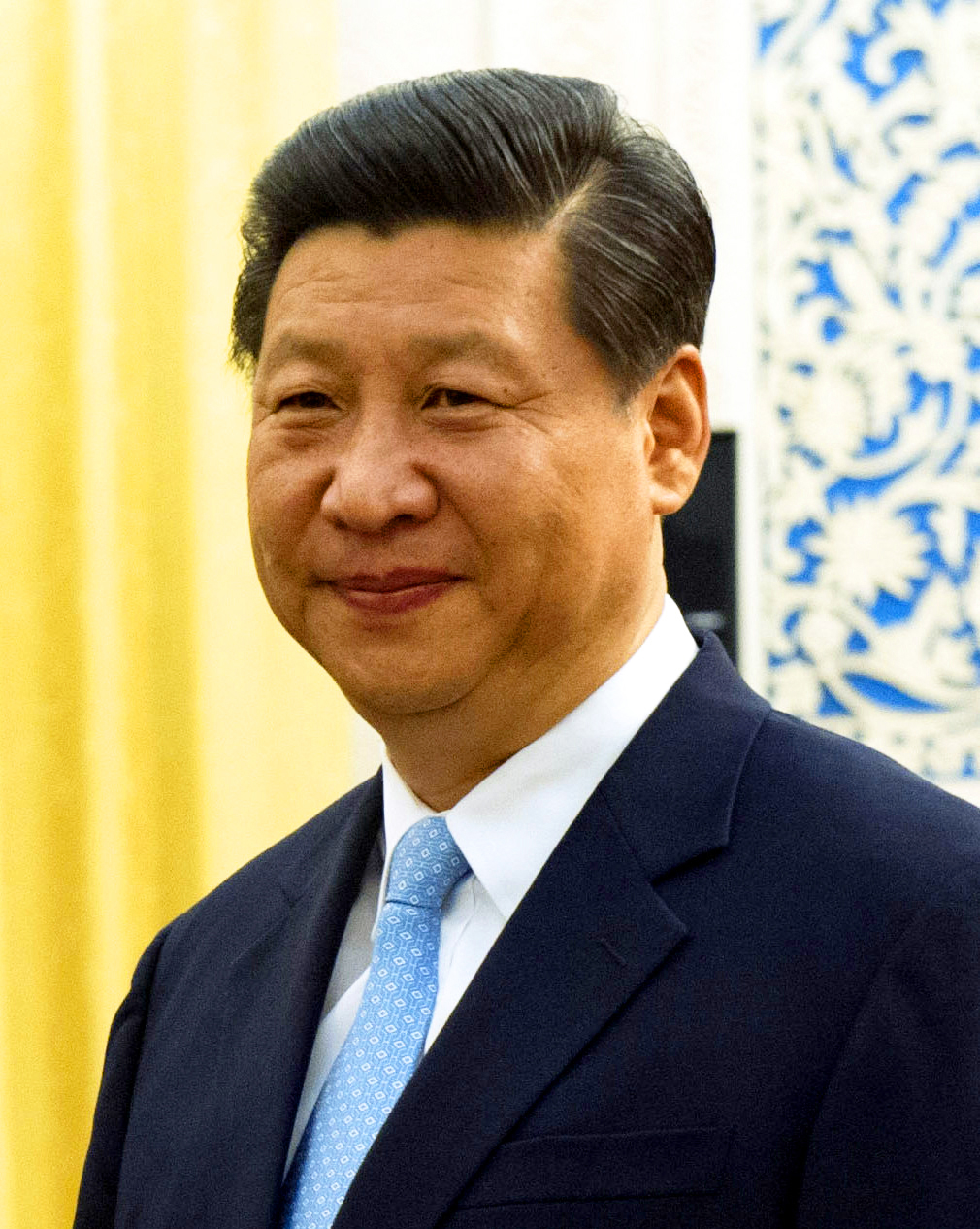
	Majority party	Minority party
Leader	Xi Jinping	Yuen Mo
Party	Communist	Pro-Beijing independent
Seats won	1	35
Delegation Convenor before election
Yuen Mo
Independent
Elected Delegation Convenor
Maria Tam
Independent

The election for the Hong Kong deputies to the 12th National People's Congress (NPC) was held on 19 December 2012. 36 Hong Kong deputies were elected by an electoral college composed of 1,621 members.

== Overview ==
The election took place at the second plenary meeting of the 12th National People's Congress election meeting on 19 December. It was attended by Li Jianguo, vice-chairman and secretary-general of the National People's Congress Standing Committee (NPCSC) as the representative of the NPCSC, and presided by Leung Chun-ying, executive chairman of the 19-strong presidium which included former Chief Executives Tung Chee-hwa and Donald Tsang Yam-kuen, as well as Asia's richest man, Li Ka-shing, and Democratic Alliance for the Betterment and Progress of Hong Kong (DAB) chairman Tam Yiu-chung.

52 candidates ran for 36 seats with 23 outgoing delegates, including Rita Fan Hsu Lai-tai, member of the NPCSC, Maria Tam Wai-chu, deputy convenor of the Hong Kong delegation, and Fanny Law Fan Chiu-fun, Executive Council member and Chief Executive Leung Chun-ying's former top aide. New faces included former Secretary for Security Ambrose Lee Siu-kwong and Li Yinquan, vice-president of the China Merchants Group. Only two contenders are pan-democrats, Fong King-lok, executive committee member of the Hong Kong Professional Teachers' Union and Dutch-born Southern District councillor Paul Zimmerman, who quit the Civic Party in summer.

1,488 of the 1,621 electoral college members cast their votes. Each elector had to choose 36 candidates. The top 36 candidates in the ballot, as long as they receive more than 50 per cent support, would be elected. 36 of the 52 candidates were elected while 7 candidates were elected as supplementary deputies.

== Election result ==
=== Elected members (36) ===
- Cai Yi
- Laura Cha Shih May-lung
- Bernard Charnwut Chan
- Bunny Chan Chung-bun
- Chan Yung
- Cheng Yiu-tong
- Cheung Ming-man
- Choy So-yuk
- Rita Fan Hsu Lai-tai
- Herman Hu Shao-ming
- Ian Fok Chun-wan
- Ip Kwok-him
- Dennis Lam Shun-chiu
- Miriam Lau Kin-yee
- Priscilla Lau Pui-king
- Fanny Law Fan Chiu-fun
- Ambrose Lee Siu-kwong
- Sophie Leung Lau Yau-fun
- Li Yinquan
- Martin Liao Cheung-kong
- Lo Shui-on
- Tim Lui Tim-leung
- Ma Fung-kwok
- Ma Ho-fai
- Ng Chau-pei
- Ng Leung-sing
- Ngan Po-ling
- Maria Tam Wai-chu
- Michael Tien Puk-sun
- Peter Wong Man-kong
- Wong Ting-chung
- David Wong Yau-kar
- Wong Yuk-shan
- Andrew Yao Cho-fai
- Yeung Yiu-chung
- Zhang Tiefu

=== Supplementary members (7) ===
- Albert Au Siu-cheung
- Thomas Cheung Tsun-yung
- Feng Jiu
- Raymond Leung Hai-ming
- Li Kuo-hsing
- Alice Tso Shing-yok
- To Wai-keung

=== Detailed results ===
2012 National People's Congress election in Hong Kong
Party	Candidate	Votes	%	±%
Independent	Martin Liao Cheung-kong	1,403		
Independent	Ambrose Lee Siu-kwong	1,387		
Independent	Bernard Charnwut Chan	1,382		
Independent	Laura Cha Shih May-lung	1,368		
Independent	Ian Fok Chun-wan	1,362		
Independent	Ma Fung-kwok	1,361		
Independent	Maria Tam Wai-chu	1,346		
Independent	Ng Leung-sing	1,346		
Independent	Peter Wong Man-kong	1,318		
Communist	Zhang Tiefu	1,313		
Independent	Dennis Lam Shun-chiu	1,308		
Independent	Tim Lui Tim-leung	1,303		
Independent	Fanny Law Fan Chiu-fun	1,296		
Independent	Li Yinquan	1,292		
Independent	Cheng Yiu-tong	1,291		
Independent	Yeung Yiu-chung	1,282		
Independent	Ip Kwok-him	1,275		
Independent	Lo Shui-on	1,262		
Independent	David Wong Yau-kar	1,255		
Independent	Choy So-yuk	1,246		
Independent	Ma Ho-fai	1,244		
Independent	Chan Yung	1,243		
Independent	Sophie Leung Lau Yau-fun	1,233		
Independent	Bunny Chan Chung-bun	1,225		
Independent	Priscilla Lau Pui-king	1,207		
Independent	Wong Yuk-shan	1,192		
Independent	Cai Yi	1,183		
Independent	Michael Tien Puk-sun	1,176		
Independent	Rita Fan Hsu Lai-tai	1,155		
Independent	Andrew Yao Cho-fai	1,120		
Independent	Wong Ting-chung	1,116		
Independent	Ng Chau-pei	1,112		
Independent	Herman Hu Shao-ming	1,102		
Independent	Ngan Po-ling	1,079		
Independent	Cheung Ming-man	1,067		
Independent	Miriam Lau Kin-yee	1,042		
Independent	Feng Jiu	1,010		
Independent	To Wai-keung	914		
Independent	Li Kuo-hsing	876		
Independent	Albert Au Siu-cheung	817		
Independent	Raymond Leung Hai-ming	664		
Independent	Thomas Cheung Tsun-yung	611		
Independent	Alice Tso Shing-yok	552		
Independent	Shi Kai-biu	298		
Independent	Lincoln Lu	290		
Independent	Ip Wing-yuk	285		
Independent	Helen Meng Mei-ling	271		
Independent	Peter Chan Po-fun	253		
Independent	Cheung Kwai-lan	249		
Independent	Paulus Johannes Zimmerman	226		
Independent	Chan Tak-ling	186		
Independent	Fong King-kok	172		
Total valid votes		1,461		
Turnout		1,488	91.80	
Registered electors		1,621		

=== Result by party ===
Hong Kong local parties are not counted as national political parties and thus the below elected deputies will not carry their membership in the National People's Congress.

Affiliation	Members
DAB (8)	Maria Tam Wai-chu
DAB (8)	Yeung Yiu-chung
DAB (8)	Ip Kwok-him
DAB (8)	Choy So-yuk
DAB (8)	Chan Yung (DAB/NTAS)
DAB (8)	Priscilla Lau Pui-king
DAB (8)	Wong Ting-chung
DAB (8)	Cheung Ming-man
FTU (2)	Cheng Yiu-tong
FTU (2)	Ng Chau-pei
NCF (1)	Ma Fung-kwok
NPP (1)	Michael Tien Puk-sun
Liberal (1)	Miriam Lau Kin-yee
