= 2002 National People's Congress election in Hong Kong =

Election

- 3 December 2002

36 Hong Kong deputies to National People's Congress
- Registered: 956
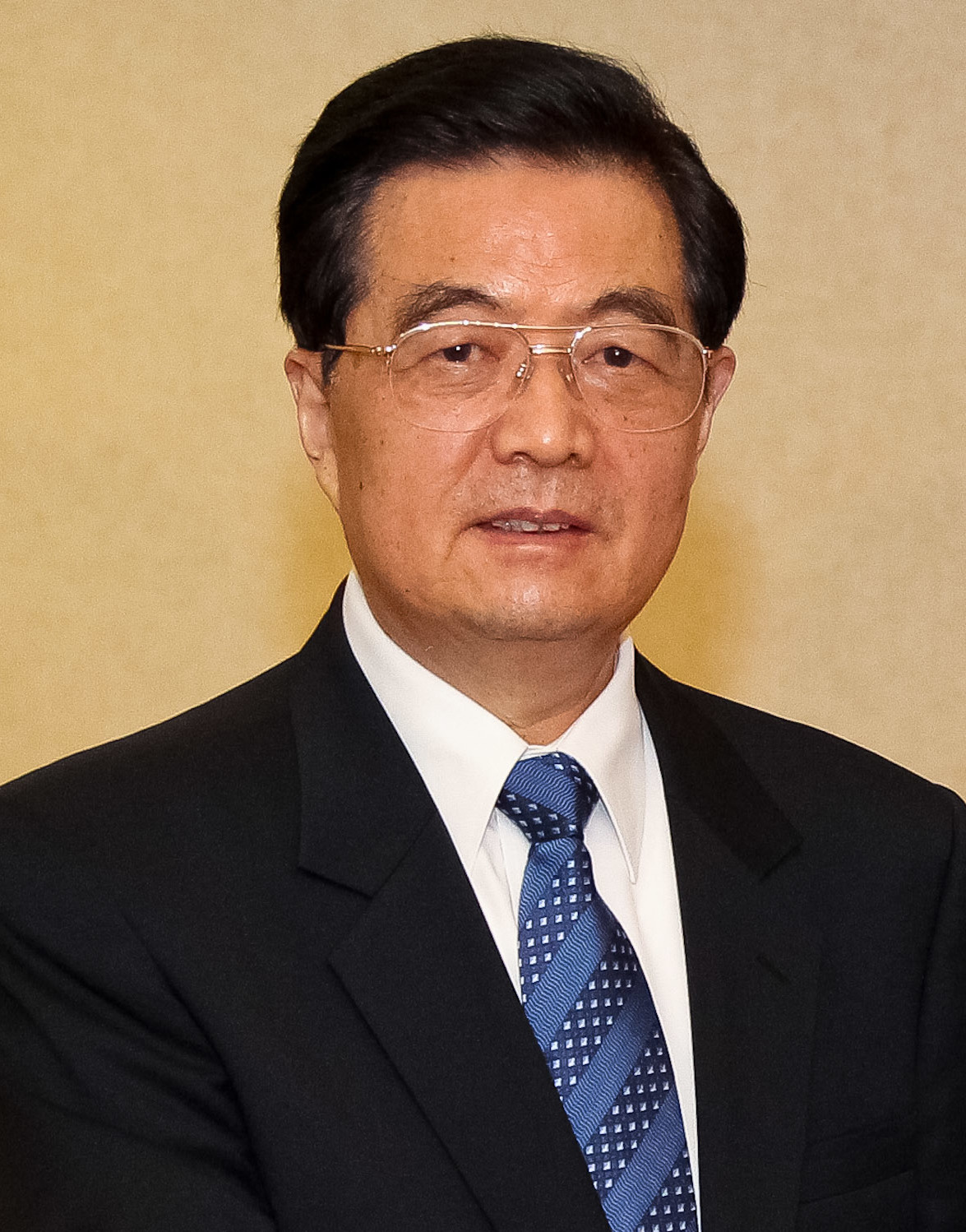

	Majority party	Minority party
Leader	Hu Jintao	Ng Hong-mun
Party	Communist	Pro-Beijing independent
Seats won	1	35
Delegation Convenor before election
Ng Hong-mun
Independent
Elected Delegation Convenor
Yuen Mo
Independent

The election for the Hong Kong deputies to the 10th National People's Congress (NPC) was held on 3 December 2002. 36 Hong Kong deputies were elected by an electoral college.

== Background ==
Article 21 of the Hong Kong Basic Law stipulates:

Chinese citizens who are residents of the Hong Kong Special Administrative Region shall be entitled to participate in the management of state affairs according to law. In accordance with the assigned number of seats and the selection method specified by the National People's Congress, the Chinese citizens among the residents of the Hong Kong Special Administrative Region shall locally elect deputies of the Region to the National People's Congress to participate in the work of the highest organ of state power.

An electoral college composed of the following:

- Members of the previous electoral college that had elected the Hong Kong deputies to the 9th National People's Congress;
- Hong Kong delegates of the 9th Chinese People's Political Consultative Committee (CPPCC);
- Members of the Election Committee (which elects the Chief Executive) who are Chinese nationals, except those who opt out; and
- The Chief Executive of the HKSAR.

== Election result ==
54 of the 78 candidates were pre-elected on 29 November 2002 and 36 of the 54 candidates were elected on 3 December. It was presided by Tung Chee-hwa, executive chairman of the 15-strong presidium. Five pro-democrats who contested in the election, Albert Ho, James To, Sin Chung-kai, Anthony Cheung and Frederick Fung were defeated in the heavily pro-Beijing electoral college. The Liaison Office was accused of issuing a recommendation list to the electors before the election.

=== Elected members (36) ===
- Robin Chan
- Cheng Yiu-tong
- David Chu Yu-lin
- Rita Fan Hsu Lai-tai
- Fei Fih
- Ip Kwok-him
- Kan Fook-yee
- Ko Po-ling
- Lam Kwong-siu
- Priscilla Lau Pui-king
- Joseph Lee Chung-tak
- Allen Lee Peng-fei
- Lee Chark-tim
- Lee Lin-sang
- Sophie Leung Lau Yau-fun
- Lo Suk-ching
- Ma Fung-kwok
- Ma Lik
- Ng Ching-fai
- Ng Hong-mun
- Ng Leung-sing
- Sik Chi-wai
- Victor Sit Fung-shuen
- Maria Tam Wai-chu
- Tsang Hin-chi
- Tsang Tak-sing
- Tso Wung-wai
- Wang Rudeng
- Carson Wen Ka-shuen
- Wong Kwok-kin
- Peter Wong Man-kong
- Philip Wong Yu-hong
- Wilfred Wong Ying-wai
- Raymond Wu Wai-yung
- Yeung Yiu-chung
- Yuen Mo

=== Supplementary members (16) ===
- Peter Chan Chi-kwan
- Raymond Chien Kuo-fung
- David Fang
- Fung Chi-kin
- Raymond Ho Chung-tai
- Bernard Hui Man-bock
- Stanley Ko Kam-chuen
- Dennis Lam Shun-chiu
- Leung Ping-chung
- Lo Chung-hing
- Ma Ho-fai
- Ngai Shiu-kit
- Wong Po-yan
- Wong Siu-yee
- Wong Yuk-shan
- Howard Young

2002 National People's Congress election in Hong Kong
Party	Candidate	Votes	%	±%
Independent	Rita Fan Hsu Lai-tai	859		
Communist	Wang Rudeng	853		
Independent	Ng Ching-fai	838		
Independent	Cheng Yiu-tong	831		
Independent	Maria Tam Wai-chu	831		
Independent	Wilfred Wong Ying-wai	825		
Independent	Ma Lik	818		
Independent	Yeung Yiu-chung	812		
Independent	Peter Wong Man-kong	810		
Independent	Robin Chan	795		
Independent	Raymond Wu Wai-yung	783		
Independent	Tsang Tak-sing	767		
Independent	Fei Fih	748		
Independent	Yuen Mo	731		
Independent	Tso Wung-wai	731		
Independent	Ip Kwok-him	725		
Independent	Ma Fung-kwok	700		
Independent	Ng Hong-mun	697		
Independent	Carson Wen Ka-shuen	694		
Independent	Tsang Hin-chi	676		
Independent	Lam Kwong-siu	669		
Independent	David Chu Yu-lin	646		
Independent	Sik Chi-wai	642		
Independent	Joseph Lee Chung-tak	641		
Independent	Priscilla Lau Pui-king	613		
Independent	Lee Chark-tim	610		
Independent	Allen Lee Peng-fei	593		
Independent	Philip Wong Yu-hong	584		
Independent	Lo Suk-ching	580		
Independent	Wong Kwok-kin	574		
Independent	Victor Sit Fung-shuen	554		
Independent	Lee Lin-sang	547		
Independent	Sophie Leung Lau Yau-fun	540		
Independent	Ng Leung-sing	539		
Independent	Kan Fook-yee	539		
Independent	Ko Po-ling	530		
Independent	Leung Ping-chung	520		
Independent	Wong Po-yan	518		
Independent	Raymond Ho Chung-tai	515		
Independent	Wong Yuk-shan	498		
Independent	Dennis Lam Shun-chiu	484		
Independent	Howard Young	467		
Independent	Ma Ho-fai	465		
Independent	Raymond Chien Kuo-fung	458		
Independent	Lo Chung-hing	450		
Independent	Fung Chi-kin	414		
Independent	Bernard Hui Man-bock	353		
Independent	Stanley Ko Kam-chuen	350		
Independent	Ngai Shiu-kit	341		
Independent	Wong Siu-yee	338		
Independent	David Fang	338		
Independent	Peter Chan Chi-kwan	311		
Independent	Au-yeung Shing-chiu	271		
Independent	Andrew Lam Siu-lo	242		
Turnout				
Registered electors		956		

== Controversies ==
The Liaison Office was criticised for meddling in the election; it was accused of issuing a recommendation list to the electors before the election. James Tien of the Liberal Party criticised the Liaison Office for circulating the recommendation lists, the Democratic Party's Martin Lee viewed it as a "shadow government" meddling in elections in all levels, including the Chief Executive elections, coordinating with pro-Beijing parties in Legislative Council and District Council elections.
