= 1997 National People's Congress election in Hong Kong =

- 8 December 1997

36 Hong Kong deputies to National People's Congress
- Registered: 424
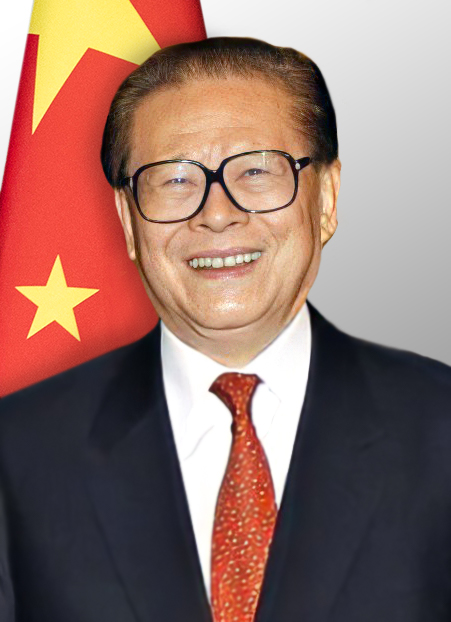

	Majority party	Minority party
Leader	Jiang Zemin	Ng Hong-mun
Party	Communist	Pro-Beijing independent
Seats won	1	35
Elected Delegation Convenor
Ng Hong-mun
Independent

The election for the Hong Kong deputies to the 9th National People's Congress (NPC) was held on 8 December 1997. 36 Hong Kong deputies were elected by an electoral college. It was the first ever election for the Hong Kong deputies to the NPC since the establishment of the Hong Kong Special Administrative Region on 1 July 1997.

== Background ==
Article 21 of the Hong Kong Basic Law stipulates:

Chinese citizens who are residents of the Hong Kong Special Administrative Region shall be entitled to participate in the management of state affairs according to law. In accordance with the assigned number of seats and the selection method specified by the National People's Congress, the Chinese citizens among the residents of the Hong Kong Special Administrative Region shall locally elect deputies of the Region to the National People's Congress to participate in the work of the highest organ of state power.

== Election result ==
The election was presided by Tung Chee-hwa, executive chairman of the 15-strong presidium and attended by Cao Zhi, secretary general of the National People's Congress Standing Committee (NPCSC). 36 of the 54 pre-elected candidates were elected with different backgrounds, including bankers, entrepreneurs, trade unionists, school headmasters, deans of university faculty, lawyers, doctors, professors, representatives from transport and communication industry and women, journalists, and new territories rural leaders.

=== Elected members (36) ===
- Robin Chan
- Chan Wing-kee
- Cheng Yiu-tong
- Rita Fan Hsu Lai-tai
- Fei Fih
- Jiang Enzhu
- Kan Fook-yee
- Priscilla Lau Pui-king
- Lee Chark-tim
- Joseph Lee Chung-tak
- Allen Lee Peng-fei
- Li Lin-sang
- Li Weiting
- Liu Lit-for
- Lo Chung-hing
- Lo Suk-ching
- Luk Tak-kim
- Ma Lik
- Ng Ching-fai
- Ng Hong-mun
- Ngai Shiu-kit
- Sik Chi-wai
- Victor Sit Fung-shuen
- Maria Tam Wai-chu
- Tsang Hin-chi
- Tsang Tak-sing
- Tso Wung-wai
- Carson Wen Ka-shuen
- Wong Kong-hon
- Peter Wong Man-kong
- Wong Po-yan
- Wilfred Wong Ying-wai
- Philip Wong Yu-hong
- Raymond Wu Wai-yung
- Yeung Yiu-chung
- Yuen Mo

=== Detailed results ===
1997 National People's Congress election in Hong Kong
Party	Candidate	Votes	%	±%
Communist	Jiang Enzhu	397		
Independent	Ng Hong-mun	350		
Independent	Tsang Tak-sing	347		
Independent	Maria Tam Wai-chu	345		
Independent	Li Weiting	332		
Independent	Yuen Mo	332		
Independent	Cheng Yiu-tong	332		
Independent	Rita Fan Hsu Lai-tai	319		
Independent	Lo Chung-hing	316		
Independent	Ma Lik	308		
Independent	Robin Chan	302		
Independent	Tsang Hin-chi	301		
Independent	Chan Wing-kee	287		
Independent	Raymond Wu Wai-yung	285		
Independent	Wong Po-yan	284		
Independent	Lee Chark-tim	279		
Independent	Wilfred Wong Ying-wai	275		
Independent	Peter Wong Man-kong	262		
Independent	Li Lin-sang	261		
Independent	Wong Kong-hon	246		
Independent	Liu Lit-for	244		
Independent	Kan Fook-yee	242		
Independent	Carson Wen Ka-shuen	236		
Independent	Philip Wong Yu-hong	225		
Independent	Luk Tak-kim	222		
Independent	Yeung Yiu-chung	219		
Independent	Lo Suk-ching	216		
Independent	Victor Sit Fung-shuen	207		
Independent	Fei Fih	206		
Independent	Ng Ching-fai	205		
Independent	Tso Wung-wai	196		
Independent	Allen Lee Peng-fei	195		
Independent	Ngai Shiu-kit	193		
Independent	Priscilla Lau Pui-king	191		
Independent	Sik Chi-wai	178		
Independent	Joseph Lee Chung-tak	174		
Independent	Leung Ping-chung	173		
Independent	Kenneth Chan Nai-keong	168		
Independent	Ng See-yuen	164		
Independent	David Chu Yu-lin	162		
Independent	Ip Kwok-chung	156		
Independent	Cecilia Daisy Chen Sheau-ling	140		
Independent	Selina Chow Liang Shuk-yee	134		
Independent	Chan Kam-lam	130		
Independent	Edward Leong Che-hung	116		
Independent	Kennedy Wong Ying-ho	114		
Independent	Rebecca Lee Lok-sze	107		
Independent	Ip Shun-hing	105		
Independent	Ronald Joseph Arculli	88		
Independent	Albert Tong Yat-chu	88		
Independent	Chan Chi-kwan	88		
Independent	Choy Kan-pui	85		
Independent	Steven Poon Kwok-lim	79		
Independent	Laurence Leung Ming-yin	78		
Turnout				
Registered electors		424		
