= 2008 National People's Congress election in Hong Kong =

- 3 December 2008

36 Hong Kong deputies to National People's Congress
- Registered: 1,234
- Turnout: 94.73%
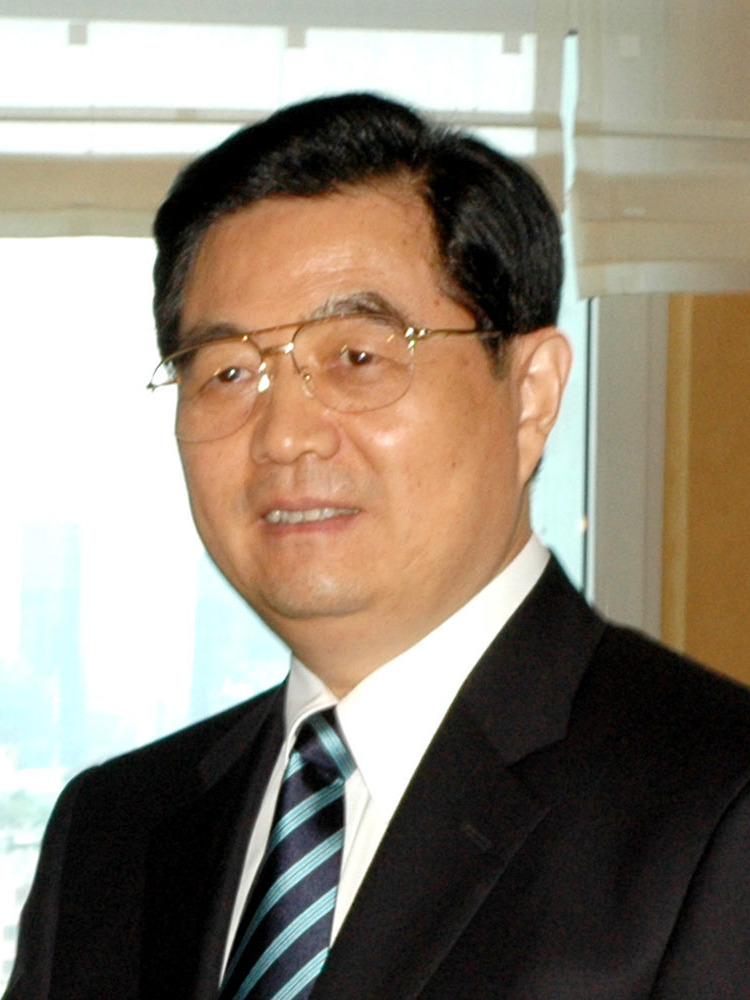

	Majority party	Minority party
Leader	Hu Jintao	Yuen Mo
Party	Communist	Pro-Beijing independent
Seats won	1	35
Delegation Convenor before election
Yuen Mo
Independent
Elected Delegation Convenor
Yuen Mo
Independent

The election for the Hong Kong deputies to the 11th National People's Congress (NPC) was held on 25 January 2008. 36 Hong Kong deputies were elected by an electoral college composed of 1,234 members.

== Background ==
Article 21 of the Hong Kong Basic Law stipulates:

Chinese citizens who are residents of the Hong Kong Special Administrative Region shall be entitled to participate in the management of state affairs according to law. In accordance with the assigned number of seats and the selection method specified by the National People's Congress, the Chinese citizens among the residents of the Hong Kong Special Administrative Region shall locally elect deputies of the Region to the National People's Congress to participate in the work of the highest organ of state power.

A 1,234-strong electoral college composed of the following:

- Members of the previous electoral college that had elected the Hong Kong deputies to the 10th National People's Congress;
- Hong Kong delegates of the 10th Chinese People's Political Consultative Committee (CPPCC);
- Members of the Election Committee (which elects the Chief Executive) who are Chinese nationals, except those who opt out; and
- The Chief Executive of the HKSAR.

== Overview ==
The election took place at the second plenary meeting of the 11th National People's Congress election meeting on 25 January. It was attended by National People's Congress Standing Committee (NPCSC) vice-chairman Sheng Huaren and presided by Chief Executive Donald Tsang Yam-kuen as executive chairman of the 19-member presidium.

9 incumbent delegates decided to step down including Allen Lee Peng-fei, Tsang Tak-sing, Sik Chi-wai and Tsang Hin-chi and member of the NPCSC Ng Hong-mun. It attracted new faces such as Executive Councillors Laura Cha Shih May-lung and Bernard Charnwut Chan, chairman of the Chinese General Chamber of Commerce Ian Fok Chun-wan, former chairman of the Kowloon-Canton Railway Michael Tien Puk-sun and former Secretary for Education and Manpower Fanny Law Fan Chiu-fun. There were also three pan-democrats, James To Kun-sun and Mak Hoi-wah of the Democratic Party and Frederick Fung Kin-kee of the Association for Democracy and People's Livelihood.

1,169 of the 1,234 electoral college members cast their votes. Each elector had to choose 36 candidates. The top 36 candidates in the ballot, as long as they receive more than 50 per cent support, would be elected. 36 of the 52 candidates were elected while 7 candidates were elected as supplementary deputies. 2 incumbents, Philip Wong Yu-hong and David Chu Yu-lin failed to retain their seats in surprise.

== Election result ==
=== Elected members (36) ===
- Laura Cha Shih May-lung
- Bernard Charnwut Chan
- Cheng Yiu-tong
- Choy So-yuk
- Rita Fan Hsu Lai-tai
- Fei Fih
- Ian Fok Chun-wan
- Raymond Ho Chung-tai
- Ip Kwok-him
- Ko Po-ling
- Dennis Lam Shun-chiu
- Fanny Law Fan Chiu-fun
- Joseph Lee Chung-tak
- Miriam Lau Kin-yee
- Priscilla Lau Pui-king
- Sophie Leung Lau Yau-fun
- Leung Ping-chung
- Martin Liao Cheung-kong
- Lo Shun-on
- Lo Suk-ching
- Tim Lui Tim-leung
- Ma Fung-kwok
- Ma Ho-fai
- Ng Ching-fai
- Ng Leung-sing
- Maria Tam Wai-chu
- Michael Tien Puk-sun
- Tso Wung-wai
- Wang Rudeng
- Carson Wen Ka-shuen
- Wong Kwok-kin
- Peter Wong Man-kong
- Wilfred Wong Ying-wai
- Wong Yuk-shan
- Yeung Yiu-chung
- Yuen Mo

=== Supplementary members (4) ===
- David Chu Yu-lin
- Peter Hung Hak-hip
- Leung Fu-wah
- Philip Wong Yu-hong

2008 National People's Congress election in Hong Kong
Party	Candidate	Votes	%	±%
Independent	Rita Fan Hsu Lai-tai	1,118		
Independent	Laura Cha Shih May-lung	1,108		
Independent	Ma Fung-kwok	1,092		
Independent	Maria Tam Wai-chu	1,088		
Independent	Ian Fok Chun-wan	1,087		
Communist	Wang Rudeng	1,079		
Independent	Ng Ching-fai	1,073		
Independent	Wilfred Wong Ying-wai	1,069		
Independent	Bernard Charnwut Chan	1,062		
Independent	Cheng Yiu-tong	1,062		
Independent	Yeung Yiu-chung	1,061		
Independent	Joseph Lee Chung-tak	1,060		
Independent	Fei Fih	1,051		
Independent	Leung Ping-chung	1,049		
Independent	Ng Leung-sing	1,047		
Independent	Ip Kwok-him	1,037		
Independent	Peter Wong Man-kong	1,036		
Independent	Dennis Lam Shun-chiu	1,028		
Independent	Carson Wen Ka-shuen	1,028		
Independent	Fanny Law Fan Chiu-fun	1,027		
Independent	Martin Liao Cheung-kong	1,022		
Independent	Sophie Leung Lau Yau-fun	1,022		
Independent	Yuen Mo	1,003		
Independent	Priscilla Lau Pui-king	978		
Independent	Miriam Lau Kin-yee	965		
Independent	Wong Yuk-shan	959		
Independent	Lo Suk-ching	953		
Independent	Lo Shun-on	920		
Independent	Tso Wung-wai	918		
Independent	Ko Po-ling	889		
Independent	Choy So-yuk	876		
Independent	Michael Tien Puk-sun	867		
Independent	Wong Kwok-kin	867		
Independent	Raymond Ho Chung-tai	832		
Independent	Ma Ho-fai	827		
Independent	Tim Lui Tim-leung	821		
Independent	Peter Hung Hak-hip	818		
Independent	Philip Wong Yu-hong	815		
Independent	David Chu Yu-lin	801		
Independent	Leung Fu-wah	761		
Independent	Frederick Fung Kin-kee	266		
Independent	Chong Chan-yau	232		
Independent	Peter Chan Po-fun	223		
Independent	Mak Hoi-wah	187		
Independent	James To Kun-sun	170		
Independent	Stephanie Cheung Sau-yu	160		
Independent	Chan Choi-hi	153		
Independent	Sun Lung	138		
Independent	Lam Kwok-hung	134		
Independent	Jimmy Siu See-kong	129		
Total valid votes		1,138		
Turnout		1,169	94.73	
Registered electors		1,234		
