= 2004 Hong Kong legislative election in Hong Kong Island =

- 12 September 2004

All 6 Hong Kong Island seats to the Legislative Council
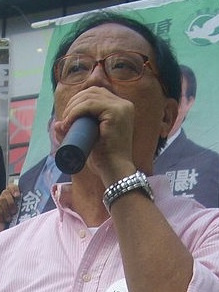

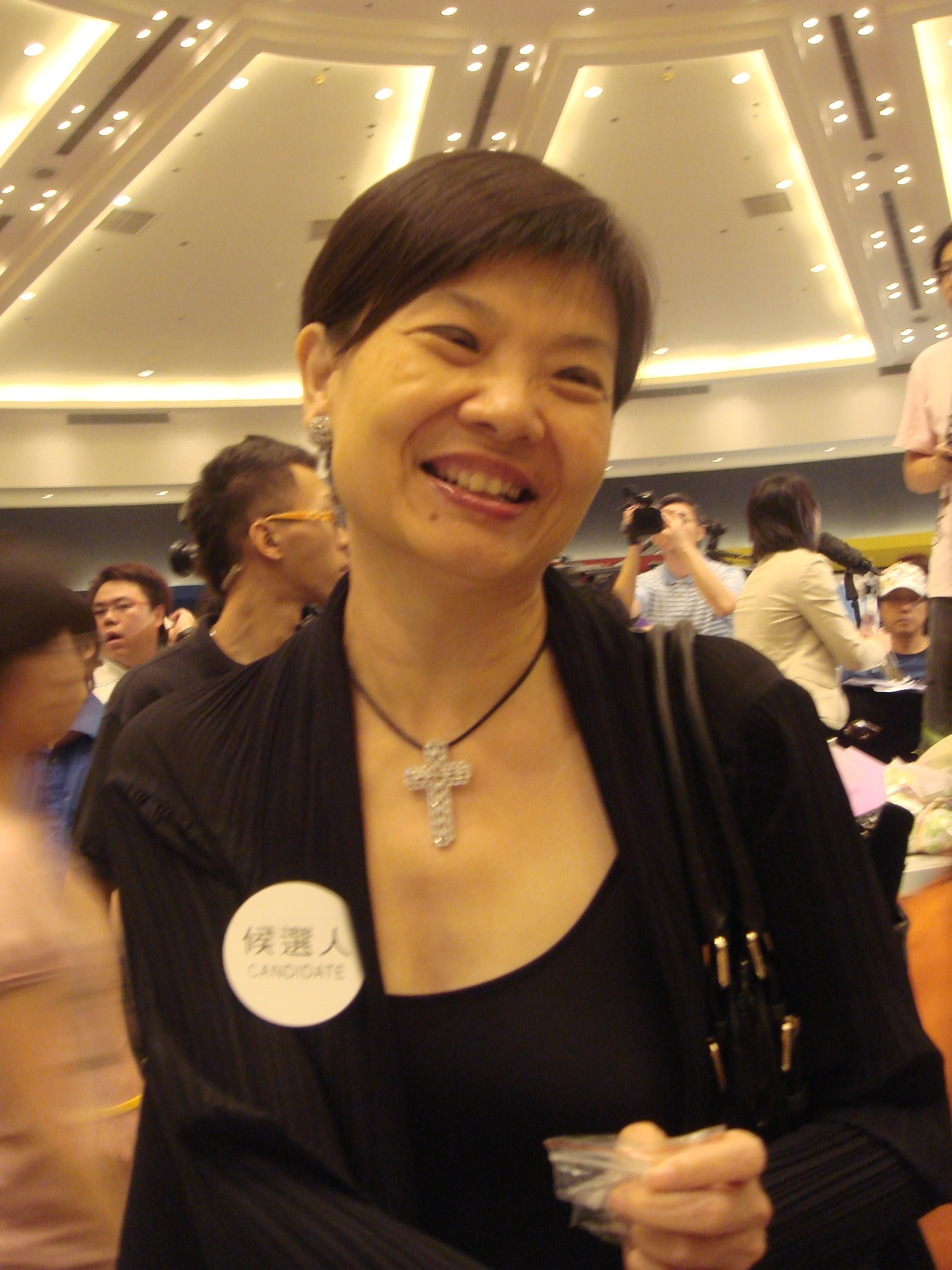

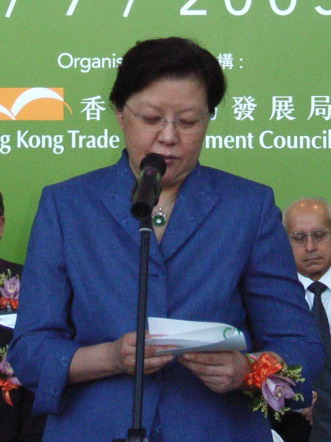
	First party	Second party
Leader	Yeung Sum	Ma Lik
Party	Democratic	DAB
Alliance	Pro-democracy	Pro-Beijing
Last election	2 seats, 35.3%	2 seats, 27.8%
Seats before	2	1
Seats won	2	2
Seat change	Steady	▲1
Popular vote	131,788	74,659
Percentage	37.2%	21.1%
Swing	▲1.9%	▼6.7%
	Third party	Fourth party
Leader	Audrey Eu (Independent)	Rita Fan
Party	Frontier	Independent
Alliance	Pro-democracy	Pro-Beijing
Last election	1 seat, 10.0%	N/A
Seats before	2	0
Seats won	1	1
Seat change	▼1	▲1
Popular vote	73,844	65,661
Percentage	20.9%	18.5%
Swing	▲10.9%	N/A
- Party with most votes in each District Council Constituency.

These are the Hong Kong Island results of the 2004 Hong Kong legislative election. The election was held on 12 September 2004 and all 6 seats in Hong Kong Island were contested. The pro-democracy camp failed to win four out of six seats with the two tickets of the Democratic Party and Article 45 Concern Group's Audrey Eu and The Frontier's Cyd Ho joint ticket. The last-minute emergency call of Martin Lee cost the defeat of Cyd Ho in a narrow margin to Democratic Alliance for the Betterment of Hong Kong's (DAB) Choy So-yuk. Legislative Council President Rita Fan also contested in Hong Kong Island for the first time.

Six tickets took part in the election, with the DAB fielding a ticket of chairman Ma Lik and Choy So-yuk and the pro-democrats fielding three tickets, one consisted of Martin Lee, Yeung Sum and Joseph Lai of the Democratic Party, the second consisted of Audrey Eu and Cyd Ho, and the third included former Democratic Party member Tsang Kin-shing. Other candidates included independent insurance agent Kelvin Wong Kam-fai. Rita Fan also fielded her one-candidate ticket, aiming at the votes from the middle and upper class voters from the sandwich of Hong Kong's pro-Beijing vs. pro-democracy political spectrum, despite herself was supported by the pro-Beijing camp.

The two pro-democracy tickets with the slogan "1+1=4" provided that their supporters would have cast their votes evenly to the two tickets. Pre-election polls showed, nevertheless, that the Eu-Ho ticket had far more supporters, causing the Democratic Party to request all supporters of the camp to vote instead for their ticket just two weeks before the election. It turned out that the Democratic Party drew too many votes from the Eu-Ho ticket, causing Cyd Ho defeat by DAB's Choy So-yuk, by a slim margin of 815 votes (or 0.23% of all valid votes). Should the Democratic Party drew around 1900 more votes from the Eu-Ho ticket, the third-rank candidate on their list would have defeated Choy. When the results were announced in the morning of the following day, Martin Lee said before cameras "I'd rather lose with dignity than win like this", on the "unexpected" defeat of Cyd Ho.

== Overall results ==
Before election:

↓
3	2
Pro-democracy	Pro-Beijing

Change in composition:

↓
3	3
Pro-democracy	Pro-Beijing

Party	Seats	Seats change	Contesting list(s)	Votes	%	% change
Democratic	2	0	1	131,788	37.2	+1.9
Frontier	1	−1	1	73,844	20.9	+10.9
Independent	0	0	1	5,313	1.5	N/A
Pro-democracy camp	3	0	3	210,945	59.6	+10.5
DAB	1	0	1	74,659	21.1	–6.7
Independent	1	0	1	65,661	18.5	N/A
Pro-Beijing camp	3	0	2	140,320	39.6	+0.7
Independent	0	0	1	2,830	0.8	N/A
Turnout:				354,095	57.6	

== Candidates list ==
Vote share
1. Democratic (37.2%)
2. DAB (21.1%)
3. Other (41.7%)

Legislative Election 2004: Hong Kong Island
List	Candidates	Votes	Of total (%)	± from prev.
Democratic	Yeung Sum, Martin Lee Chu-ming Joseph Lai Chi-keong	131,788	37.2 (16.67+16.67+3.88)	+1.9
DAB	Ma Lik, Choy So-yuk Christopher Chung Shu-kun, Yeung Wai-foon, Lee Yuen-kwong, Cheung Kwok-kwan	74,659	21.1 (16.67+4.42)	−6.7
Independent (Frontier)	Audrey Eu Yuet-mee Cyd Ho Sau-lan	73,844	20.9 (16.67+4.15)	N/A
Nonpartisan	Rita Fan Hsu Lai-tai	65,661	18.5	N/A
Grass-root pro-democrats	Tsang Kin-shing, Chung Chung-fai, Tang Chui-chung	5,313	1.5	−2.3
Nonpartisan	Kelvin Wong Kam-fai	2,830	0.8	N/A
Total valid votes		354,095	100.00	
Rejected ballots		2,270		
Turnout		356,365	57.62	+15.59
Registered electors		618,451		

== See also ==
- Legislative Council of Hong Kong
- Hong Kong legislative elections
- 2004 Hong Kong legislative election
