= Guangdong delegation to the National People's Congress =

Guangdong Delegation to the National People's Congress
- 全国人民代表大会广东省代表团
- Delegation for the National People's Congress
- Map showing the location of Guangdong Province
- Electoral unit: Guangdong Province
- Population: 126,012,510

Current Delegation
- Created: 1954
- Seats: 169
- Head of delegation: Huang Chuping
- Provincial People's Congress: Guangdong Provincial People's Congress

The Guangdong delegation to the National People's Congress is a delegation composed of deputies representing Guangdong Province within the National People's Congress (NPC), the highest organ of state power of the People's Republic of China. NPC deputies from the Guangdong Province are officially elected by the Guangdong Provincial People's Congress.

== List of deputies ==
| Year | NPC sessions | Deputies | Number of deputies | Ref. |
|---|---|---|---|---|
| 1954 | 1st | Ding Ying, Fang Fang, Wang Guoxing, Gu Dacun, Gu Yuan, Wu Jinnan, Li Boqiu, Li Jianzhen, Du Guoxiang, Wang Hanguo, Zhou Yang, Lin Wenbiao, Lin Ping, Lin Qiangyun, Ke Lin, Xu Zhucheng, Qu Mengjue, Zhang Wen, Zhang Zhennan, Zhang Qingchun, Chen Rutang, Chen Qiyou, Chen Yuan, Chen Side, Chen Huanyong, Zeng Sheng, Feng Baiju, Huang Qixiang, Huang Dingchen, Huang Jie, Huang Yaomian, Ye Jianying, Lei Jieqiong, Liao Siguang, Liao Mengxing, Liu Simu, Cai Tingkai, Cai Chusheng, Cai Qiao, Jiang Guangnai, Deng Wenzhao, Long Sangong, Jian Yujie, Dai Ailian, Luo Mingyu, Tan Pingshan | | |
| 1959 | 2nd | Ding Ying, Wen Minsheng, Wang Shengbao, Deng Wenzhao, Lu Huanzhang, Ye Jizhuang, Liu Simu, Zhu Guang, Hua Fengxiang, Du Guoxiang, Li Jianzhen (female), Chen Rutang, Chen Qiyou, Chen Yuan, Chen Yu, Chen Qiuan, Chen Nengxing, Chen Side, Chen Huanyong, Chen Jingkai, Wu Lengxi, Gu Yuansong, Zheng Tianbao, Zheng Tieru, Lin Wenbiao, Lin Keming, Lin Yuechuan, Lin Qiangyun, Zhang Hanming, Zhang Jian (female), Shao Liangchu, Luo Mingyu Luo Fanqun, Zhou Lindu, Zhou Wanru (female), Zhou Yang, Zhao Guangju, Ke Lin, Liang Guang, Liang Ju, Liang Boqiang, Xu Guangping (female), Xu Chongqing, Guo Dihuo, Mei Rixin, Mei Yi, Zeng Sheng, Qin Xiudian, Huang Dingchen, Huang Jie, Jiao Linyi, Lei Jieqiong (female), Liao Siguang (female), Liao Mengxing (female), Jiang Guangnai, Cai Tingkai, Cai Qiao, Cai Chusheng, Qian Xuesen, Bao Guobao, Xie Zhiguang, Dai Ailian (female) | | |
| 1964 | 3rd | Ma Dayou, Ma Shun, Wang Zhongyan, Wang Yudong, Wang Yucai, Wang Guoxing, Wang Shoudao, Wang Quan, Wang Jianming, Wei Chengdong, Wei Que, Qu Mengjue, Mao Wenshu, Deng Wenzhao, Deng Geming, Deng Xiuqiu, Deng Guo, Deng Jiadong, Deng Yunqiu, Feng Guangren, Feng Deyu, Gu Dacun, Gu Yuan, Lu Huanzhang, Ye Jizhuang, Liu Chixuan, Liu Simu, Guan Shanyue, Xu Guangping, Xu Dixing, Xu Chongqing, Zhu Cai, Zhu Mingkai, Qiao Ehua, Wu Juetian, Hua Fengxiang, Wei Xiuying, Hong Xiannu, Shen Jichuan, Li Shiyou, Li Zao, Li Jianzhen, Li Qiubai, Li Dunhua, Li Shanbang, Yang Daying, Yang Tieyun, Yang Kanghua, Wu Lengxi, Wu Zhuo, Yu Ben, Yu Zhongkui, Yu Xiqu, Yu Hui, Gu Yuansong, Li Su, He Jie, He Kang, He Qi, He Jingzhen, Zhang Hanming, Zhang Jun, Zhang Jian, Zhang Guigeng, Zhang E, Lu Chunling, Chen Xintao, Chen Xihao, Chen Qiyou, Chen Yu, Chen Yuan, Chen Qiuan, Chen Lingfeng, Chen Shu, Chen Side, Chen Huanyong, Chen Weiguan, Chen Jingkai, Shao Liangchu, Zheng Tianbao, Zheng Tieru, Zheng Zengtong, Zheng Shulan, Lin Wenbiao, Lin Keming, Lin Liming, Lin Yancheng, Lin Yuechuan, Lin Jurui, Lin Qiangyun, Ouyang Shan, Ou Chu, Luo Mingyu, Jin Ming, Jin Shuyi, Zhou Wenying, Zhou Benrong, Zhou Yang, Zhou Quangen, Zhou Tingzhen, Zhou ShoukaiZhou Lindu, Zhou Jiachi, Zhou Wanru, Zhou Chaosong, Zhao Zhuoyun, Zhao Shanhuan, Ke Lin, Zhong Lin, Rong Zugao, Gao Zhaolan, Guo Erque, Guo Ruming, Guo Dihuo, Tang Yaozu, Qin Guangyu, Qian Xuesen, Xu Guangze, Tao Tao, Tao Zhu, Liang Guang, Liang Yuancheng, Liang Boqiang, Liang Weilin, Liang Yiwen, Kou Qingyan, Shang Chengzuo, Xiao Junying, Xiao Huanhui, Mei Rixin, Mei Yi, Qi Yuande, Zeng Sheng, Zeng Zhi, Xie Shen, Xie Zhiguang, Peng Jiamu, Huang Yizi, Huang Ganying, Huang Bingwei, Huang Jie, Huang Zhenxun, Huang Jifang, Huang Dingchen, Jiang Guangnai, Jiang Ying, Qin Xiudian, Lei Jieqiong, Pu Zhelong, Bao Guobao, Liao Siguang, Liao Mengxing, Cai Tingkai, Cai Qiao, Cai Chusheng, Li Shunkang, Dai Ailian, Dai Ce'an, Feng Yunhe | | |
| 1975 | 4th | Wan Lagou, Wang Yazhuang, Wang Maoqiong, Wang Xuexian, Wang Kuancheng, Mao Wenwei, Wen Chunmei, Fang Junzhuang, Deng Chu, Shi Hui, Ye Wenshui, Kuang Jianlian, Qiu Xueke, Bi Bo, Lü Meimei, Zhu Shouquan, Zhuang Shiping, Liu Junyi, Liu Guozhong, Liu Xintian, Guan Shanyue, Jiang Hanwu, Jiang Xiting, Tang Bingda, Xu Lihua, Xu Tian, Sun Yiwu, Su You, Li Guanggui, Li Yuxing, Li Jianzhen, Li Zao, Li Shubo, Li Gongxing, Li Lingbing, Li Jusheng, Li Song, Li Qingwen, Li Fuhua, Yang Guang, Yang Fosheng, Yang Qirong, Yang Zejiang, Yang Rongguo, Yang Bing, Wu Simei, Wu Xianfeng, Wu Guoxin, Wu Liusha, Wu Kangmin He Mujin, He Shaoqun, He Qiao, He Xian, He Xiansheng, He Bao, Zhang Muqing, Zhang Wenge, Zhang Hechang, Zhang Quan, Chen Shaomei, Chen Changqing, Chen Xintao, Chen Yongfeng, Chen Ronghan, Chen Xiang, Chen Jingkai, Fan Hanrui, Fan Hualuo, Lin Liming, Lin Yuechuan, Lin Fa, Lin Baoru, Lin Ailian, Ouyang Wu, Yi Zuocai, Luo Zhengxiang, Zhou Zheng, Xian Weikeng, Zheng Mingchang, Fang Laojunyi, Zhao Qiuquan, Zhao Ziyang, Ke Ping, Yi Meihou, Zhong Ming, Fei Yimin, Mo Si, Mo Xiuying, Jia Dashui, Xu Zhixiang, Guo Tianhai, Guo Dihuo, Guo Zengkai, Huang Mingwu, Huang Xing, Huang Xiuying, Huang Zhang, Huang Chanqin, Huang Tang, Huang DefuHuang Yanfang, Mei Rixin, Shang Chengzuo, Liang Yonghong, Liang Ming, Liang Zhongwen, Liang Dingbang, Liang Jinghan, Liang Xiangsheng, Liang Pei, Liang Yinjiao, Kou Yanqing, Peng Jun, Dong Shubiao, Jiang Ying, Han Youzhen, Zeng Sheng, Zeng Xiankuan, Wen Qiaoyun, Xie Rongshan, Pu Zhelong, Lai Guogui, Lai Baoyu, Lai Guimei, Lei Bingyi, Zhan Aiqiong, Cai Mingxun, Li Rijing | | |
| 1978 | 5th | Ding Pangwen, Wang Xulun, Wang Shoudao, Wang Kuancheng, Wang Yuefeng, Wang Jianming, Wang Yan, Wen Chunmei, Fang Junzhuang, Fang Shangui, Yin Linping, Deng Liu, Deng Yantang, Gan Yidi, Shi Hui, Lu Zhensen, Feng Bingquan, Feng Dongliang, Zhu Shouquan, Wu Juetian, Wu Yinjian, Wu Chan, Zhuang Shiping, Liu Tianfu, Liu Cunjin, Liu Qiurong, Liu Yaozeng, Guan Shanyue, Jiang Hanwu, Jiang Yuying, Tang Bingda, Xu Ruyin, Xu Lihua, Xu Dixing, Xu Jia, Mai Ronghui, Yan Yunlai, Lao Sen, Su You, Du Changtian, Li Guangquan, Li Yuxing, Li Yunying, Li Zao, Li Miaolan, Li Mingzhen, Li Zhongxing, Li Shubo, Li Zhouchang, Li Ju Sheng, Li Song, Li Shengpeng, Li Shufang, Yang Guang, Yang Qirong, Yang Deyuan, Xiao Yongjiu, Xiao Junying, Wu Xianfeng, Wu Junxiang, Wu Kangmin, Cen Bai, He Qiao, He Yunzhao, He Xian, He Zhou, He Bao, He Jingzhen, Zhang Qingjun, Zhang Hechang, Zhang Jinshui, Zhang Quan, Lu Dajian, Chen Yongfeng, Chen Yilin, Chen Xun, Chen Bifang, Chen Jingkai, Lin Xiaoqun, Lin Jinyou, Lin Liang, Lin Guinu, Lin Guifang, Lin Du, Ouyang Shan, Ouyang De, Luo Yuankai, Luo Zhengxiang, Luo Ziqing, Luo Xiongcai, Luo Muzhen, Jin Jifeng, Jin Shuyi, Zhou Fengping, Zhou Zheng, Xian Weikeng, Zhao Gengsheng, Zhao Shuying, Hu Jiu, Hu Ximing, Ke PingYi Meihou, Zhong Yuqin, Zhong Botao, Zhong Ming, Zhong Lin, Fei Yimin, Yao Jinzhong, Yuan Xianglan, Mo Xiuying, Mo Xun, Mo Dinglu, Jia Dashui, Xu Damu, Xu Shaochu, Gao Yulan, Guo Ruming, Guo Dihuo, Guo Zengkai, Huang Youmou, Huang Changshui, Huang Minxing, Huang Minghai, Huang Mingde, Huang Heqing, Huang Fukang, Huang Zhenquan, Huang Juxiang, Huang Yanfang, Huang Yaoxiang, Mei Rixin, Mei Hua, Cui Fengtang, Kang Hansheng, Liang Guang, Liang Shangnong, Liang Jianming, Liang Hongying, Liang Xiangsheng, Liang Pei, Liang Qufang, Kou Qingyan, Qin Zhengguang, Cheng Yangbo, Jiao Linyi, Zeng Sheng, Zeng Fopeng, Zeng Dingshi, Zeng Yan, Xie Rongshan, Lan Anhua, Pu Zhelong, Lai Guimei, Yong Wentao, Cai Fengmei, Zang Zhenhua, Liao Chengzhi, Li Huitian, Li Rongju, Li Jing, Wei Nanjin | | |
| 1983 | 6th | Ding Pangwen, Yu Fei, Ma Deguang, Wang Yuejin, Wang Xulun, Wang Jianming, Mao Wenshu, Fang Shangui, Deng Hanguang, Gan Su'e, Shi Hui, Lu Zhonghe, Ye Shuzi, Ye Xuanping, Ye Daoming, Kuang Bingren, Kuang Jianlian, Situ Huimin, Wu Shangzhong, Wu Juetian, Wu Chan, Ren Zhongyi, Zhuang Shiping, Liu Qiurong, Liu Zhenqun, Liu Jingzhong, Guan Shanyue, Guan Baoling, Guan Fuyin, Jiang Yinhuan, Tang Bingda, Xu Shijie, Xu Guanghan, Xu Lihua, Xu Dixing, Mai Ronghui, Li Hua, Li Liansheng, Li Jianzhen, Li Zao, Li Yisen, Li Jian'an, Li Chunhua, Li Quanlong, Li Zhenquan, Li Jusheng, Li Yaoqi, Yang Yunfang, Yang Guang, Yang Qi Hua, Yang Huiying, Wu Wen, Wu Wentong, Wu Lisu, Wu Bosen, Wu Qiuju, Wu Huanxing, Wu Jianmin, Wu Kangmin, Wu Zhangsheng, He Wen, He Wenduan, He Ying, He Xian, Yu Shen, Shen Yongchun, Zhang Guang, Zhang Shiqian, Zhang Hechang, Zhang Guiying, Zhang Chaochong, Lu Dajian, Lu Xisheng, Chen Shufeng, Chen Guangbao, Chen Yilin, Chen Xiaoxia, Chen Hong, Chen Linyu, Chen Guokai, Chen Changjun, Chen Juntang, Chen Zuyi, Chen Zhigui, Chen Yanfa, Chen Biguang, Fan Yangxuan, Fan Xingdeng, Lin Qihong, Lin Jinru, Luo Tian, Luo Yuankai, Luo Zhengxiang, Luo Xiongcai, Jin Jifeng, Jin Shuyi, Zhou Yueying, Zhou Yimiao, Zhou Zheng, Zheng FobiaoZheng Guoxiong, Meng Zhaoxing, Zhao Chongduo, Hu Shaohe, Ke Ping, Yi Meihou, Zhong Ming, Zhong Zhen, Zhong Lin, Fei Yimin, Yao Jinzhong, Luo Yunfeng, Qin Boqiang, Qin Hui, Mo Ganqin, Xu Dailiu, Xu Fu, Yin Xikuan, Guo Ruming, Guo Junyan, Guo Shuohong, Tang Zhian, Tang Xingqiao, Tao Tao, Huang Kaibing, Huang Youmou, Huang Yumei, Huang Jianying, Huang Xiuhua, Huang Guosheng, Huang Bingwei, Huang Zhenquan, Huang Mengzhong, Huang Yanfang, Mei Rixin, Mei Hua, Mei Yi, Pan Bayi, Pan Mingchang, Liang Guang, Liang Lingguang, Liang Jianming, Liang Feng, Liang Qufang, Liang Xiang, Liang Shen, Kou Qingyan, Cheng Yangbo, Zeng Qingcun, Zeng Dingshi, Zeng Peng, Wen Yilian, Wen Huizhen, Xie Nanzhu, Pu Zhelong, Lei Yu, Cai Saihua, Liao Chengzhi, Tan Baoxian, Xiong Heng, Li Keqiang, Li Keng, Pan Jionghua | | |
| 1988 | 7th | Yu Fei, Ma Wanqi, Qu Tangliang, Qu Jianquan, Mao Wenshu, Wen Shuiquan, Fang Shaoyi, Fang Shangui, Deng Yaohui, Lu Zhonghe, Lu Ruihua, Ye Liqun, Ye Peiying, Ye Qin, Ye Xuanping, Ye Xionggan, Kuang Jianlian, Situ Rongsheng, Ji Yaqiu, Zhu Youzhi, Zhu Senlin, Wu Shengying, Wu Shangzhong, Wu Juetian, Wu Xueqiong, Wu Chan, Ren Zhongyi, Liu Zhiping, Liu Qiurong, Liu Fuzhi, Liu Zhenqun, Guan Shanyue, Guan Shuping, Jiang Lifang, Jiang Jialiang, Tang Bingda, Xu Shijie, Xu Xiaohua, Xu Jiatun, Su Ping, Du Yuejian, Li Liansheng, Li Jianzhen, Li Zhaoyan, Li Jinyun, Li Jinpei, Li Yuhuang, Li Kesheng, Li Ruiyuan Li Hao, Yang Wengui, Yang Li, Yang Hanguang, Yang Yingqun, Yang Qihua, Yang Deyuan, Wu Lizhen, Wu Kangmin, Qiu Guanyu, He Ying, He Houhua, Wang Zhongying, Wang Mingquan, Wang Bin, Shen Simei, Shen Yongchun, Zhang Huaxiang, Zhang Shiqian, Zhang Jianhua, Zhang Cong, Zhang Funian, Zhang Yanfeng, Lu Dajian, Chen Zibin, Chen Youqing, Chen Yuanmu, Chen Hong, Chen Changjun, Chen Jingyuan, Chen Bixia, Chen Yanfa, Fan Xingdeng, Fan Meiying, Lin Fengxian, Lin Zhihou, Lin Ruo, Lin Guoqiang, Lin Huanxin, Ouyang De, Ou Chu, Luo Tian, Luo Yuankai, Luo Zhengxiang, Luo Qiaonian, Zhou Zheng, Zheng Yaotang, Zhao Runeng, Hu Kai, Ke Ping, Ke JuyaYi Meihou, Zhong Liangying, Fei Yimin, Yao Jinzhong, Yao Jiahua, Qin Mu, Yuan Weishi, Mo Xinyin, Xu Fu, Xu Chengren, Xu Shixiong, Xu Xuebin, Guo Junyan, Guo Shuohong, Tang Zhian, Tang Xingqiao, Tang Xin, Rong Baisheng, Tao Siju, Huang Yumei, Huang Guangcai, Huang Guanghan, Huang Guosheng, Huang Zhuliang, Mei Rixin, Mei Hua, Fu Ruhai, Liang Guangda, Liang Ripei, Liang Weicheng, Liang Lingguang, Liang Maohuan, Liang Zhenyuan, Liang Xiang, Jiang Xinrong, Zeng Dingshi, Zeng Zhaoke, Wen Huizhen, Xie Yumei, Xie Fei, Xie Qianghua, Xie Nanzhu, Lan Shuimei, Lan Zhongsheng, Pu Zhelong, Lei Jieqiong, Zhan Bohui, Cai Tiyuan, Cai Senlin, Cai Saihua, Liao Pingyin, Liao Hui, Liao Yaozhu, Duanmu Zheng, Tan Yingke, Tan Weiru, Xiong Zhuanhao, Li Guoxin, Huo Yingdong, Dai Zuolin, Dai Jie, Wei Zhenlan, Wei Jianxian | | |
| 1993 | 8th | Yu Fei, Ma Wanqi, Wang Jin, Wang Fosong, Wang 𬬸, Wang Mingang, Wei Jishun, Wen Paotian, Fang Shaoyi, Fang Bao, Yin Lin, Gu Huamin, Li Youwei, Lu Zhonghe, Ye Liqun, Ye Qin, Ye Xionggan, Ye Yao, Qiu Chuanying, Lü Jianming, Lü Qin, Zhu Wanli, Zhu Liang, Zhu Senlin, Wu Shangzhong, Liu Guansong, Liu Zhiping, Liu Ruiqiang, Guan Shanyue, Tang Bingquan, Xu Yan, Hong Xiannu, Li Wenqing, Li Lanfang, Li Weiting, Li Liansheng, Li Jinwei, Li Guoqiao, Li Zejun, Li Zetian, Li Baoqun, Li Shaozhen, Li Taiqian, Li Weixin, Li Ruiyuan, Li Chuzhu, Li Hao, Yang Junsheng, Yang Taifang, Wu Yuejin, Wu Ping, Wu Bo, Wu Shun Hong, Wu Kangmin, He Huawan, He Houhua, He Deqiang, He Yaodi, Lü Zhiguang, Wang Zhongying, Wang Mingquan, Shen Yongchun, Zhang Tiansong, Zhang Hanqing, Zhang Weiji, Zhang Yuanyi, Zhang Mingxi, Zhang Huizhong, Zhang Lei, Zhang Xiankun, Lu Daquan, Lu Dajian, Lu Chiran, Lu Peiyan, Lu Yaobao, Chen Yongqi, Chen Bangqing, Chen Youqing, Chen Tongqing, Chen Weiguang, Chen Miaozhen, Chen Hong, Chen Changjun, Chen Jiancai, Chen Xuehua, Chen Bixia, Lin Liangxiao, Lin Ruo, Lin Jinhan, Lin Suhua, Lin Weiming, Lin Shuguang, Luo Shoumian, Luo Fuhe, Zhou Nan, Zheng Hongduo, Zheng Yaotang, Fang Yashui (Yao ethnic group), Zhao Runeng, Zhao Zhongming,Ke Zhengping, Ke Yan, Ke Juya, Liu Jinzhou, Yi Meihou, Zhong Guangchao, Yao Jiahua, Yuan Jinghuan, Nie Yongqiang, Xu Shixiong, Xu Qichao, Xi Shundi, Ling Botang, Tang Guang'an, Tang Zhi'an, Tang Xingqiao, Tang Haiying (female, Yao ethnicity) Rong Baisheng, Huang Guangyao, Huang Wenjian, Huang Dongchao, Huang Guanghan, Huang Huazhu, Huang Guosheng, Huang Zhongyong, Huang Jianli, Huang Diyan, Liang Guangda, Liang Gewen, Liang Kunhao, Liang Jincheng, Liang Aishi, Liang Jianpeng, Peng Shilu, Qin Zixing, Zeng Maochao, Zeng Zhaoke, Zeng Xiansong, Zeng Xianzi, Zeng Decheng, Wen Yuhua, You Jingyu, Xie Xiande, Xie Fei, Xie Songkai, Xie Qianghua, Pu Zhelong, Lai Xiujuan, Jian Fuyi, Cai Tiyuan, Cai Cheng, Cai Weiheng, Liao Hui, Liao Yaozhu, Duanmu Zheng, Tan Guangrong, Tan Yingke, Li Ziliu, Pan Ziyi, Xue Fengxuan, Huo Yingdong, Dai Jie | | |
| 1998 | 9th | Wang Zhumei, Wang Zhaocheng, Wang Zhaolin, Wang Qishan, Wang Fosong, Wang Guizhen, Wang Jun, Mao Yu'e (Manchu), Fang Bao, Deng Zuxuan, Gu Huamin, Gu Zhaosheng, Gu Wei, Lu Zhonghe, Lu Ruihua, Ye Xionggan, Shen Dan, Tian Jiyun, Shi Xiaoyu, Lü Xueliang, Zhu Tianhua, Zhu Senlin, Zhuang Lixiang, Liu Zhiquan, Liu Wenjie, Liu Ning, Liu Huichong, Liu Guansong, Liu Rongsen, Liu Yaoling, Jiang Donghai, Xu Yan, Sun Zhichu, Hong Xiannu, Mai Hong, Su Zirui, Su Zhigang, Su Zequn, Du Yuanliu, Li Li, Li Zibin, Li Yuanyuan, Li Changchun, Li Yujuan, Li Lanfang (Manchu), Li Zhihua, Li Peiran, Li Guojie, Li Guoqiang, Li Baoqun Li Menglu, Li Shaozhen, Li Jingwei, Li Xiaofang, Li Yinxia (Zhuang ethnicity), Li Hongzhong, Li Ruiyuan, Li Xinjia, Yang Huawei, Yang Qinhuan, Xiao Yang, Xiao Gang, Wu Guangqiu, Wu Huanan, Qiu Jianxing, He Hongming (Zhuang ethnicity), He Wuquan, He Jianqiang, He Meiyi, He Dexian, Si Zhiguang, Tong Xing, Yu Shanglin, Zhang Hanqing, Zhang Weiji, Zhang Zhiping, Zhang Mingbiao, Zhang Chunlin, Zhang Liang, Zhang Guixi, Zhang Meiying, Zhang Guoying, Zhang Mingxi, Zhang Chaoqiu, Zhang Xiangwei, Lu Baifu, Chen Pingle, Chen Weizhong, Chen Weirong, Chen Bing, Chen Lini, Chen Miaozhen, Chen Guoqiang, Chen Mingde, Chen Xuexi, Chen Jianhui, Chen Ling, Chen Xueying, Chen Ziyun, Chen ShanyunChen Ziying, Lin Shusen, Lin Zhenzhong, Lin Yong, Lin Shuguang, Ou Shaoyan, Luo Yingfa, Luo Fuhe, Zhou Rifang, Zhou Liqun, Zheng Yushu, Zheng Zhuohui, Zhao Xiuzhen (Yao), Hu Bingliu, Ke Yan (Manchu), Liu Chuanzhi, Zhong Guangchao, Zhong Xueyi, Zhong Huiping, Ling Botang, Ling Yan, Tang Haiying (Yao), Tang Shurong, Huang Ziqiang, Huang Longyun, Huang Weiguang, Huang Guanhua, Huang Lihui, Huang Guo Sheng, Huang Zhongyong, Huang Bingzhang, Huang Fuyong, Huang Deming, Cui Xun, Liang Guangda, Liang Gewen, Liang Weifa, Liang Shaotang, Liang Tiansheng, Liang Xuhong, Peng Wenxing, Jiang Haiying, Qin Weidong, Cheng Zhiqing, Fu Hanxun, Zeng Qingshen, Zeng Zhaoke, Wen Pengcheng, Wen Yaoshen, You Jingyu, Xie Xiaoyin, Xie Taijian, Xie Xiande, Xie Songkai, Xie Qianghua, Liao Yaoxian, Tan Guorong, Huo Yingbo, Huo Fuhua, Dai Jie | | |
| 2003 | 10th | Yu Youjun, Ma Weihua, Wang Yiming (Hui), Wang Dongming, Wang Ningsheng, Wang Zhumei (female), Wang Rusong, Wang Yumei (female), Wang Shunsheng, Wang Xunzhang, Wang Jun, Mao Yu'e (female, Manchu), Fang Chaogui, Kong Lingren, Deng Guoxiong (Yao), Deng Mingyi (female), Lu Zhonghe, Lu Ruihua, Ye Xiaoqiu (female), Shen Dan (female), Feng Yurong, Rong Tiewen, Lü Lei, Zhu Fengyun, Zhuang Chengtian, Liu Zhigeng, Liu Laiping, Liu Kun, Liu Weiming, Guan Zewen, Guan Runyao, Jiang Hong, Jiang Haiyan (female), Tang Bingquan, Tang Weiying, Sun Songpu, Mai Jiejun, Mai Yanyu (female), Su Zhigang, Su Zhihe, Su Yaorong, Li Li (female), Li Changchun, Li Dongsheng, Li Donghui, Li Lanfang (female, Manchu) Li Yongzhong, Li Gang, Li Lianhe, Li Linkai, Li Guojie, Li Guoqiang, Li Ming (female), Li Bingji, Li Chunhong, Li Xiaofang (female), Li Qing, Yang Yuemei (female, Zhuang), Yang Bailing, Yang Qinhuan, Wu Zixiang, Wu Junguang, Wu Daowen, He Zhengba, He Dexian, Si Zhiguang, Sha Zhenquan, Song Yayang, Song Hai (Manchu), Zhang Guangning, Zhang Zhiping (female), Zhang Yuqing, Zhang Yingjie, Zhang Kai, Zhang Guoying (female), Zhang Dejiang, Lu Baifu, Chen Guangfu, Chen Dan, Chen Weizhong, Chen Guanguang, Chen Miaozhen (female), Chen Xuexi, Chen Shaoji, Chen Yong, Chen Genkai, Chen Xueying (female), Chen Min (female), Chen Ziyun (female), Chen Shu (female), Chen Shanru, Chen Jinting, Wu Jiesi, Lin Wen,Lin Qingyuan, Lin Shusen, Lin Jian, Lin Xiong, Lin Shuguang, Luo Dongyuan, Luo Hongying (female), Luo Bochuan, Luo Zeqin (female), Luo Fuhe, Luo Xinchang, Zheng Liping, Zheng Dingping, Zheng Detao, Zhao Juhua (female), Liu Jinzhou, Zhong Qiquan, Ni Le, Ni Huiying (female), Xu Shaohua, Xu Shenghui, Xu Jianhua, Xu Huiming (female), Xu Yuanyuan (female, Manchu), Guo Zeshen, Tang Hao, Huang Sanhe, Huang Huahua, Huang Jinsong, Huang Xihua (female), Huang Bingzhang, Huang Jiezhen (female) Huang Lianming, Huang Fengqing (Zhuang ethnicity), Huang Yuzhen, Huang Deming, Chang Houchun, Zhang Jiechun, Liang Guangda, Liang Weifa, Liang Shaotang, Jie Ye, Dong Mingzhu (female), Jiang Chengsong, Jiang Haiying (female), Cheng Qing (female), Fu Hanxun, Shi Mingsheng, Zeng Qinghong, Zeng Ming, Zeng Qiang, Wen Guanhe, Wen Junyi, Wen Pengcheng, You Jingyu (female), Xie Jianyu, Lei Yulan (female), Liao Mingbin, Tan Guorong, Tan Jiaju, Xiong Xiaodong, Li Guikang, Yan Zhiqing, Xue Yusheng, Huo Fuhua, Wei Chucheng . | | |
| 2008 | 11th | Ma Xingtian, Wang Longxia (female), Wang Dong, Wang Ningsheng, Wang Jun, Wang Rusong, Wang Nanjian, Wang Xunzhang, Wang Menghui, Kong Lingren, Deng Qiaoling (female), Deng Zhicong (Yao ethnicity), Deng Haiguang, Deng Weilong, Long Hanrong, Lu Zhonghe, Lu Ruihua, Shen Dan (female), Bai Zhijian, Ning Yuanxi, Zhu Siyi, Wu Jintang, Liu Xiaohua, Liu Youjun, Liu Laiping, Liu Wu, Liu Kun, Liu Shaoyong, Liu Xuegeng, Liu Fucai, Tang Xikun, Xu Zongheng, Mai Qingquan, Su Wuxiong, Su Qingling (female), Li Yihu, Li Fei, Li Dongsheng, Li Yongliang, Li Yongzhong, Li Ruqiu, Li Xinghua, Li Xinghao, Li Lili (female), Li Qihong (female), Li Miaojuan (female), Li Linkai, Li Bingji, Li Jianhua, Li Ronggen, Li Shuming (female), Li Jia Li Yuquan, Yang Yuemei (female, Zhuang), Yang Xiue (female), Yang Haoming, Wu Musheng, Wu Zixiang, Wu Ju (female), Qiu Mei (female), He Yuhua, He Weiying (female), He Mei (female), He Jing (female), Yu Ziquan, Wang Yang, Sha Zhenquan, Song Yayang, Song Enlai, Song Hai (Manchu), Zhang Guangning, Zhang Keqiang, Zhang Litian, Zhang Guoquan, Zhang Yubiao, Zhang Shuhua, Zhang Simin (Hui), Zhang Xiaoming, Zhang Fusheng, Chen Xiaochuan (female), Chen Guangfu, Chen Yunxian, Chen Dan, Chen Yujie (female), Chen Yongzhi, Chen Hongping, Chen Weicai, Chen Huawei, Chen Yaosheng (Zhuang), Chen Guoan, Chen Yini (female), Chen Hongxian, Chen Yong, Chen Jiaji, Chen Xuerong (female), Chen Min (female), Chen Shu (female), Chen Ruiai(female), Chen Chaotian, Chen Yaoguang, Zhao Yufang (female), Lin Shaochun, Lin Daofan, Lin Xinhua, Lin Shuguang, Ou Guangyuan, Ou Zhenzhi, Mingsheng, Luo Weiqi, Luo Yuanfang (female), Zhou Haibo, Xian Dongmei (female), Zheng Riqiang, Zheng Hong, Zheng Zhentao, Zheng E, Zhao Juhua (female), Hu Xiaoyan (female), Zhong Shijian, Zhong Yangsheng, Zhong Qiquan, Zhong Mingzhao, Zhong Nanshan, Zhong Huanqing, He Youlin, Yuan Guibin, Yuan Chao, Ni Le, Ni Huiying (female), Xu Long, Xu Yuan Yuan (female, Manchu), Gao Siren, Huang Longyun, Huang Daren, Huang Huahua, Huang Yangxu, Huang Liman (female), Huang Qibin, Huang Xuejun (female), Huang Xihua (female), Huang Bingzhang, Huang Hongming, Huang Huiqiu, Cui Zhenji, Liang Yaowen, Liang Yaohui, Dong Mingzhu (female), Jiang Haiying (female), Lu Xiulu, Zeng Qinghong, Wen Pengcheng, Xie Qianghua, Lai Xiuhua (female), Lai Kunhong, Lei Yulan (female), Lei Xiaoling (female), Cai Mahui, Cai Zongze, Tan Jutian, Pan Haoxuan | | |
| 2013 | 12th | Ma Huateng, ~~Ma Xingtian~~, Ma Gangling, Wang Zhongbing, Wang ~~Rusong~~, Wang Lingna (female), Wang Huiqun, Wang Jingwu, Wang Xiaohong (female), Deng Zhenlong, Ai Xuefeng, Long Fang (female), Lu Xin (female), Ye Guoxian, Qiu Zhiyong, Qiu Xinghong (female), Bai Tian, Bai Zhijian, Ning Yuanxi, Si Xianmin, ~~Lü Bin~~, Zhu Xiaodan, Zhu Lieyu, Wu Jintang, Xiang Xiaomei (female), Zhuang Jian, Liu Xiaoquan (female), Liu Wei, Liu ~~Zhiqiang~~, Liu Zhongping, Liu Shaoxi, Liu Yuelun, Jiang Ling, Jiang Yuanbo (female), Xu Ningsheng, Xu Yafei, Xu Qin, Mai Qingquan, Li Xiaoyong, Li Yihu, Li Fei, Li Wenxin, Li Dongsheng, Li Yongliang, Li Yongzhong, Li Gang, Li Qingxiong, Li ~~Xinghua~~, Li Xingling (female), Li Lili (female), ~~Li Lin Kai~~, Li Bingji, Li Chunhong, Li Shuming (female), Li Ruiwei, Xiao Zhiheng, Wu Daming, Wu Qing (female), Wu Hong, Wu Zili, He Dongping, He Ningka, He Guifang (Yao ethnic group), He Yehui (female), Yu Xizhi, Yu Ziquan, Yu Tianliang, Wang Nandong, Song Liping (female), Zhang Chuanwei, Zhang Hongwei, Zhang Litian, Zhang Zhaoxing, Zhang Guoquan, Zhang Yubiao, Zhang Guifang, Zhang Xiaoming, Zhang Qunying (female), Chen Xiaochuan (female), Chen Xiaohua, Chen Dan, Chen Dong, Chen Weicai, Chen Huawei, Chen Lihua (female), Chen Liangxian, Chen Jianhua, Chen Yiwei, Chen Min (female), Chen Shu (female), Chen Ruiai (female), Yuan Shaojun, Fan Dongping (female), Lin Shuiqi, Lin Xinhua, Ou Guangyuan, Zhuo Zhiqiang, Ming Sheng,Yi Fengjiao (female), Luo Weiqi, Luo Yuanfang (female), Zhou Tianhong, Zhou Bo, Zhou Yifeng, Zhou Haibo, Xian Runxia (female), Pang Guomei (female), Zheng Renhao, Zheng Hong, Zheng E, Meng Xiangkai, Zhao Donghua (female), Zhao Xuefang (female, Yao ethnicity), Hu Wei (female), Hu Chunhua, Ke Yunfeng, Zhong Nanshan, He Youlin, Yuan Zhimin, Yuan Liqun (female), Yuan Baocheng, Yuan Guibin, Ni Huiying (female), Xu Shaohua, ~~Xu Long~~, Xu Jianxian, Weng Yilan (female), Guo Feng, Huang Longyun, Huang Ningsheng Huang Huahua, Huang Yangxu, Huang Lirong (female), Huang Jianping, Huang Xihua (female), Huang Bingzhang, Huang Haiyan (female), Huang Kun, Cui Zhenji, Liang Fengyi (female), Liang Zhiyi, ~~Liang Yimin~~, Liang Yaohui, ~~Peng~~ Jianwen, Dong Mingzhu (female), Han Chunjian, Qin Chunhui (female, Zhuang ethnicity), Lu Xiulu, Zeng Zhiquan, Zeng Xianggui (female), Wen Pengcheng, Xie Shuwen (female), Lai Kunhong, Lei Yulan (female), Lei Jun, Lei Xiaoling (female), Tan Juntie, Xiong Jinmei (female), Pan Haoxuan, Dai Zhenqiu | | |
| 2018 | 13th | Wang Guangya, Wang Zhimin, Li Yihu, Li Fei, Li Jinghai, Yang Hua, Zhang Rongshun, Zhang Xiaoming, Lu Dongfu, Chen Sixi, Zheng Xiaosong, Ding Ming (worker), Ma Huateng, Ma Xingrui, Wang Yidong, Wang Shiqin (female), Wang Yadong, Wang Xuecheng, Wang Jianjun, Wang Lingna (female, farmer), Wang Sheng, Wang Tao, Wang Jingwu, Wang Ruijun, Wang Xiaohong (female, returned overseas Chinese), Wei Qinglan (female, Zhuang ethnicity, worker), Fang Lixu, Yin Zhaolin, Deng Zhenlong, Lu Xin (female), Ye Niuping, Ye Meifen (female), Qiu Hai, Bai Yingyu (female, worker), Feng Yubao (returned overseas Chinese), Feng Yi, Ning Ling, Zhu Lieyu, Zhu Wei, Zhuang Jian, Liu Xiaoquan (female, farmer), Liu Guanghe (worker), Liu Ruopeng, Liu Shaoxi, Liu Yi, Mi Xuemei (female, migrant worker), An Ran (female, returned overseas Chinese), Xu Zhihui, Sun Jianguo, Sun Yuanyuan (female, worker)~~Mai Jiaomeng~~Su Ronghuan (migrant worker), Li Xiaolan (female, farmer), Li Xiaoqin (female), Li Shuyu, Li Yumei (female), Li Shiping, Li Dongsheng, Li Lan (female), Li Xianlan (female, migrant worker), Li Xingling (female), Li Lili (female), Li Xi, Li Bingji, Li Jindong (farmer), Li Jinbo~~Li Tie~~Li Qingquan, Li Shuqiang, Yang Feifei (migrant worker), Yang Mingfang (female, Tujia ethnic group, worker), Yang Zhen (female), Yang Xusong, Xiao Shengfang, Wu Yulian (female, returned overseas Chinese), Wu Liejin, Wu Qingping, Wu Xiwei, Wu Xiang (female, worker), He Guifang (Yao ethnic group, farmer), She Danqing, Yu Xueqin (female, migrant worker), Shen Xina (female, farmer), Song Erwei, Zhang Chuanwei, Zhang Hongwei, Zhang Zhiliang, Zhang Li (female), Zhang Xiao, Chen Guanghao, ~~Chen Xubin~~, Chen Rugui, Chen Jianhua, Chen Haiyi (female), Chen Ruiai (female), Chen Yingyu, Fan Zhongjie, Lin Shaochun, Lin Shuiqi, ~~Lin~~ Yiying, Lin Yong, Ming Sheng, Luo Jun, Luo Zhen (worker), Zhou Haibo, Zheng Jiange, Zhao Jianshe, Ke Yunfeng, Duan Yufei, Rao Wenlin (female), Shi Kehui, Jiang Jianjun, Yao Yisheng, Yuan Yuyu, Yuan Zhimin, Qian ~~Chunyang~~, Xu Jianxian (farmer), Yin Zhao Ju, Yin Huanming, Weng Yilan (female), Guo Jiao (female), Guo Feng, Huang Longyun, Huang Yebin, Huang Hanbiao, Huang Lihui, Huang Dachang, Huang Jianping, Huang Xihua (female), Huang Guisong (worker), Huang Bingzhang, Huang Xiaoyu (female), Huang Haiqiao (farmer), Cao Yanming (female, worker), Gong Jiali, Yan Wu (returned overseas Chinese), Liang Tao (farmer), Liang Weidong, Liang Debiao (farmer), Peng Changying (female, farmer), Dong Mingzhu (female), Cheng Ping (female), ~~Jiao Lansheng~~, Zeng Xiaomin (female), Zeng Qinghong, Zeng Xianggui (female, migrant worker), Wen Guohui, Wen Yanchang (female, farmer), Wen Zhanbin, Wen Jinling (female, farmer), Wen Pengcheng, Xie Jian (worker), Xie Shuwen (female, farmer), Cai Weiping, Cai Zhongguang, Liao Guiping (worker), Xiong Xiaodong (female), Miao Guole, Fan Qingfeng, Li Xia (female), Pan Limei (female, Zhuang ethnicity)Dai Yunlong . | | |
| 2023 | 14th | Ding Xuemei, Ma Xuepei, Wang Weizhong, Wang Zhihua, Wang Xuecheng, Wang Guiqing, Wang Yanshi, Wang Hui, Wang Hai, Wang Xiongfei, Wei Qinglan, Zhi Guangnan, Qu Yanming, Che Wenquan, Ai Xuefeng, Lu Haichen, Ye Zhenqin, Ye Jilian, Bai Tao, Feng Xingya, Feng Jian, Ning Ling, Lü Shiming, Lü Chengxi, Zhu Kongjun, Zhu Zhengfu, Ren Jiajiong, Ren Hai, Quan Hanyan, Liu Ya, Liu Jin, Liu Liping, Liu Sheng, Liu Bing, Liu Bin, Mi Xuemei, Tang Yiwei, Xu Zerong, Xu Xiaoxiong, Ruan Yangyue, Sun Jianguo, Sun Jian, Su Ronghuan, Li Xiaolan, Li Xiaoqin, Li Changdong, Li Yumei, Li Shiping, Li Dongsheng, Li Qingxin Li Zheng, Li Jihui, Li Xuesong, Li Kuiwen, Yang Wanming, Yang Liting, Yang Qingchun, Yang Denghui, Xiao Limei, Xiao Zhanxin, Wu Fengli, Wu Zhongkai, Wu Xiaohui, Qiu Jihua, He Xiaopeng, He Guosen, He Jianfeng, Yu Jinfu, Zou Jinkai, Sha Yan, Shen Yanfen, Song Erwei, Song Zhe, Zhang Hu, Zhang Chunmei, Zhang Heng, Zhang Yong, Zhang Xiao, Zhang Haibo, Zhang Jiaji, Zhang Yun, Chen Guanghao, Chen Xudong, Chen Xubin, Chen Yang, Chen Zhilie, Chen Zhiqing, Chen Wangdi, Chen Yuqun, Chen Siyang, Chen Tao, Chen Haiyi, Chen Shuxian, Chen Hui, Chen Shirong, Miao Wei, Lin Shuiqi, Lin Jiaru, Lin Lan, Lin Yanyun, Ming ShengLuo Dan, Luo Zhen, Jin Likui, Zhou Guangquan, Zhou Chong, Zhou Hong, Zhou Jian, Zhou Lin, Zhou Bin, Zheng Jie, Zheng Haitao, Zheng Yanxiong, Zheng Xincong, Fang Yiling, Zhao Guizhi, Zhao Xingcun, Zhong Liqin, Zhong Zheng, Luo Huining, Qin Lisha, Yuan Yuyu, Mo Youkun, Xu Wenli, Xu Yanming, Xu Jianxian, Xu Xiaoxia, Gao Wen, Gao Song, Gao Jianchuan, Guo Yonghang, Guo Huiqin, Tang Hongwu, Huang Ningsheng, Huang Xi Qin, Huang Dachang, Huang Zhihao, Huang Xiufen, Huang Kunming, Huang Shaolong, Huang Guisong, Huang Bingzhang, Huang Yan, Huang Chuping, Cao Yanming, Chang Juping, Cui Yan, Chen Yiqin, Dong Mingzhu, Jiang Kaiping, Jiang Taijiao, Jiang Yajun, Han Wensheng, Qin Weizhong, Yu Lianxiang, Cheng Kaimin, Zeng Fengbao, Zeng Jinze, Wen Wenxing, Xie Rupeng, Xie Jian, Xie Qingmei, Liao Zhilue, Li Guangzhen, Li Minghua, Xue Qikun | | |
