= Herman Hu =

Hong Kong politician

Image of Herman Hu

Herman Hu (Chinese: 胡曉明; born February 1954) was the Chairman of the Council of City University of Hong Kong from 2012 to 2017. Hu is a Member of the Chinese People's Political Consultative Conference (CPPCC) and Hong Kong deputy to the 12th & 13th National People's Congress of the People's Republic of China (NPC). Hu was one of the first Election Committee members to nominate Leung Chun-ying for the post of Chief Executive of Hong Kong. Hu is the head of Ryoden Development Ltd and is the son of Hu Fa-kuang.
