= Wong Ting-chung =

Chinese businessman (born 1961)

Wong Ting-chung BBS JP
- 王庭聰
- Born: 14 October 1961 (age 64); Quanzhou, Fujian, China
- Occupation: Entrepreneur
- Years active: 1982–present
- Title: Chairman and CEO, Nameson Holdings Limited

Wong Ting-chung, BBS JP (Chinese: 王庭聰; born 14 October 1961) is a Hong Kong entrepreneur. He is the chairman and chief executive of the Nameson Holdings Limited, the chairman of the New Territories Commercial and Industrial General Association and the advisor to the Heung Yee Kuk. He is also the Hong Kong deputy to the National People's Congress.

Wong graduated from Hong Kong Yee Tong Ye College in 1978. He established his business through Hang Cheong Knitting Factory, a factory engaged in the production of knitwear products, in 1982 and established of Nameson Group’s business through Nameson Industrial in September 1990.

He was awarded Bronze Bauhinia Star in 2011 and made Justice of Peace in 2015. In 2011, he was elected Hong Kong deputy to the National People's Congress and was re-elected in 2017.
