= Jiang Enzhu =

Chinese diplomat and politician

- 姜恩柱
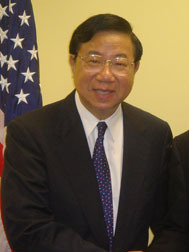
- Jiang in 2007

Chairperson of the Foreign Affairs Committee of National People's Congress
- In office March 2003 – March 2008
- Preceded by: Zeng Jianhui
- Succeeded by: Li Zhaoxing

Director of the Hong Kong Liaison Office
- In office January 2000 – August 2002
- Preceded by: Zhou Nan
- Succeeded by: Gao Siren

Chinese Ambassador to the United Kingdom
- In office December 1995 – March 1997
- Preceded by: Ma Yuzhen
- Succeeded by: Ma Zhengang

Personal details
- Born: December 14, 1938 (age 87) Gaoyou, Jiangsu, China
- Party: Chinese Communist Party
- Education: Beijing Foreign Studies University; Harvard University

Jiang Enzhu (Chinese: 姜恩柱; pinyin: Jiāng Ēnzhù; born 14 December 1938) is a Chinese retired diplomat and politician. Jiang was a member of the 15th CPC Central Committee, he served as Chinese ambassador to the United Kingdom, as president of the Xinhua News Agency, as director of the Hong Kong Liaison Office.

== Biography ==
Jiang was born in Gaoyou, Jiangsu Province, China in December 1938, but grew up in Shanghai. He graduated from Beijing Foreign Studies University in 1964 with a degree in English. After graduation, he was assigned to work for the Chinese Embassy in the UK. In 1978, he was transferred to Ministry of Foreign Affairs of the People's Republic of China. In 1981, Jiang was sent to the United States to study by the Chinese Government, he studied in Harvard University and worked in the Brookings Institution. Jiang returned to China in 1983, then he worked in Ministry of Foreign Affairs of the People's Republic of China.

In July 1997, Jiang served as president of the Xinhua News Agency. In January 2000, Jiang served as director of the Hong Kong Liaison Office. In March 2003, he was elected a standing committee member of the 10th National People's Congress. He retired in March 2008.

Diplomatic posts
Preceded by Ma Yuzhen	Chinese Ambassador to the United Kingdom; 1995–1997	Succeeded by Ma Zhengang
Government offices
Preceded by Himself as President of Xinhua News Agency	Director of Liaison Office of the Central People's Government in Hong Kong; 2000–2002	Succeeded by Gao Siren
Assembly seats
Preceded by Zeng Jianhui	Chairperson of the Foreign Affairs Committee of National People's Congress; 2003–2008	Succeeded by Li Zhaoxing
