= Li Yinquan =

Chinese economist (born 1955)

Li Yinquan (Chinese: 李引泉; born April 1955) is a Chinese economist. He is the chairman of the executive director of the China Merchants China Direct Investments Limited and the chief financial officer and has become the vice president of the China Merchants Group. He is also director of the Chinese General Chamber of Commerce. He is also the Hong Kong deputy to the National People's Congress.

Graduated from the graduate school of the People's Bank of China with the Master of Economics in 1986 and the Finafrica Institute in Milan, Italy with a master's degree in Banking & Finance in 1988, he worked with the Agricultural Bank of China for 14 years and became the deputy general manager of Hong Kong branch. He joined the China Merchants Group Limited in January 2000 and has served respectively as the general manager of finance department, deputy chief financial officer and chief financial officer and has been the vice president since March 2004. Li was once honoured as "China CFO of the Year for 2005" and "China Best CIO for the Year 2006".
