= Ian Fok =

Hong Kong politician

- Chinese: 霍震寰
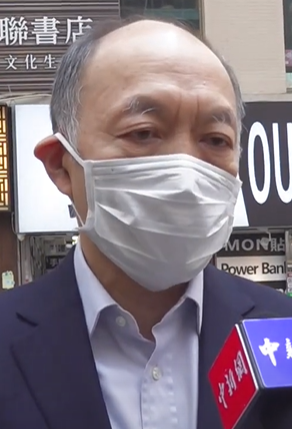

National People's Congress Delegate
- In office 2007-2021

Personal details
- Born: 12 May 1949 (age 77)
- Parent: Henry Fok (father)
- Education: University of British Columbia

Ian Fok Chun-wan, SBS, JP (Chinese: 霍震寰; born 12 May 1949) is the Chief Executive of the Fok Ying Tung Foundation and the life honorary chairman of the Chinese General Chamber of Commerce. He is the incumbent Hong Kong delegate to the National People's Congress.

== Biography ==
Son of famous pro-China tycoon Henry Fok, he graduated from the University of British Columbia with the Master of Business Administration. He was made Justice of the Peace in 2003 and was awarded the Silver Bauhinia Star (SBS) in 2005. He was first elected to the 11th National People's Congress in 2007 and was re-elected in 2011 and 2017. He is also the vice-chairman of the All-China Youth Federation and director of the Bank of East Asia. Currently, he and his wife Jo Jo have three children together.
