= Ma Fung-kwok =

Hong Kong politician

The Honourable Ma Fung-kwok
- 馬逢國
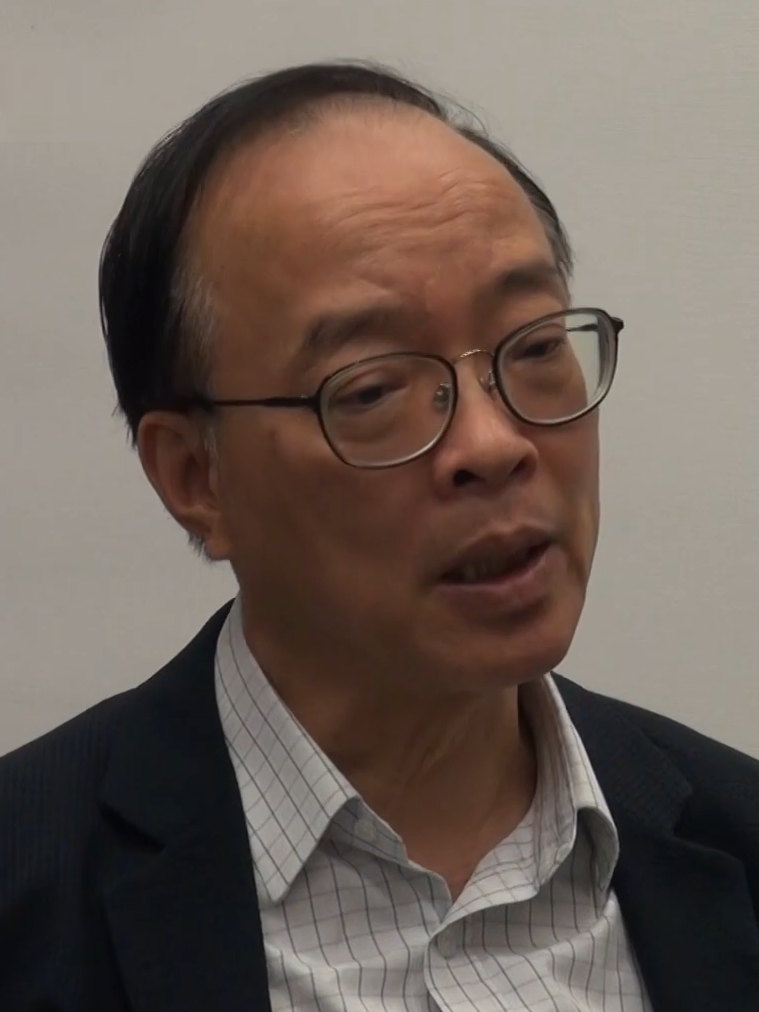
- Ma in 2019

Head of the Hong Kong Delegation to the National People's Congress
- Incumbent
- Assumed office 3 March 2018
- Preceded by: Maria Tam

Member of the Legislative Council
- Incumbent
- Assumed office 1 January 2022
- Preceded by: Constituency created
- Constituency: Election Committee
- In office 1 October 2012 – 31 December 2021
- Preceded by: Timothy Fok
- Succeeded by: Kenneth Fok
- Constituency: Sports, Performing Arts, Culture and Publication
- In office 16 September 2001 – 30 September 2004
- Constituency: Election Committee
- In office 1 July 1998 – 30 June 2000
- Constituency: Election Committee
- In office 22 February 1997 – 4 April 1998 (Provisional Legislative Council)

Personal details
- Born: 22 July 1955 (age 70) Hong Kong
- Party: New Century Forum
- Spouse: Kitty Leung
- Occupation: Legislative Councillor; Films Maker and Distributor; Media Executive

Ma Fung-kwok (Chinese: 馬逢國) is a former member of the Provisional Legislative Council and Legislative Council of Hong Kong from for Election Committee constituency and Sports, Performing Arts, Culture and Publication from 1997 to 2000 and 2012 to 2021. He has also been the leader of New Century Forum. He supported Leung Chun-ying in the 2012 Chief Executive race and was seen as an ally of CY Leung in the Legislative Council.

== Bypassing airport security ==
On 21 May 2018, Ma allegedly used his status as a legislator to bypass airport security rules to bring a 200g bottle of hair gel into the restricted area.

== Legislative Council ==
In December 2021, it was reported that Ma was eligible to vote four times in the 2021 Hong Kong legislative election, yielding 0.0366611% of the total voting value (elected seats), which is 7376 times more than the value of an average voter's total voting value.

In January 2022, the Chinese national emblem was permanently added to the Legislative Council chamber, after Andrew Leung, Starry Lee Wai-king and Ma Fung-kwok decided that it should be made permanent. Andrew Leung had earlier said it would be only temporary for the swearing in of lawmakers.

In July 2022, Ma said that many teenagers in Hong Kong are interested in serving the mainland Chinese military.

In November 2023, Hong Kong Free Press reported that Ma was accused, along with other directors, of "forcibly seizing control" of a company by using legal proceedings against the company.

In October 2024, Ma's personal assistant, Sei Chun-hing, was accused of having sex with an underaged female. In September 2025, the alleged victim claimed that she was assaulted by Sei when she was 11 years old; Sei's defense team denied the claim and said she was spreading lies due to Sei's political views.

Legislative Council of Hong Kong
New parliament	Member of Provisional Legislative Council; 1997–1998	Replaced by Legislative Council
New parliament	Member of Legislative Council; Representative for Election Committee; 1998–2000	Seat abolished
Preceded by Ng Ching-fai	Member of Legislative Council; Representative for Election Committee; 2001–2004	Constituency eliminated
Preceded by Timothy Fok	Member of Legislative Council; Representative for Sports, Performing Arts, Culture and Publication; 2012–2021	Next: Kenneth Fok
New constituency	Member of Legislative Council; Representative for Election Committee; 2022–	Incumbent
National People's Congress
Preceded by Maria Tam	Head of the Hong Kong Delegation to the National People's Congress; 2018–present	Incumbent
Order of precedence
Preceded by Yiu Si-wing; Member of the Legislative Council	Hong Kong order of precedence Member of the Legislative Council	Succeeded by Charles Mok; Member of the Legislative Council
