= Dennis Lam =

Hong Kong ophthalmologist, businessman and politician

Professor the Honourable Dennis Lam Shun-chiu JP
- 林順潮
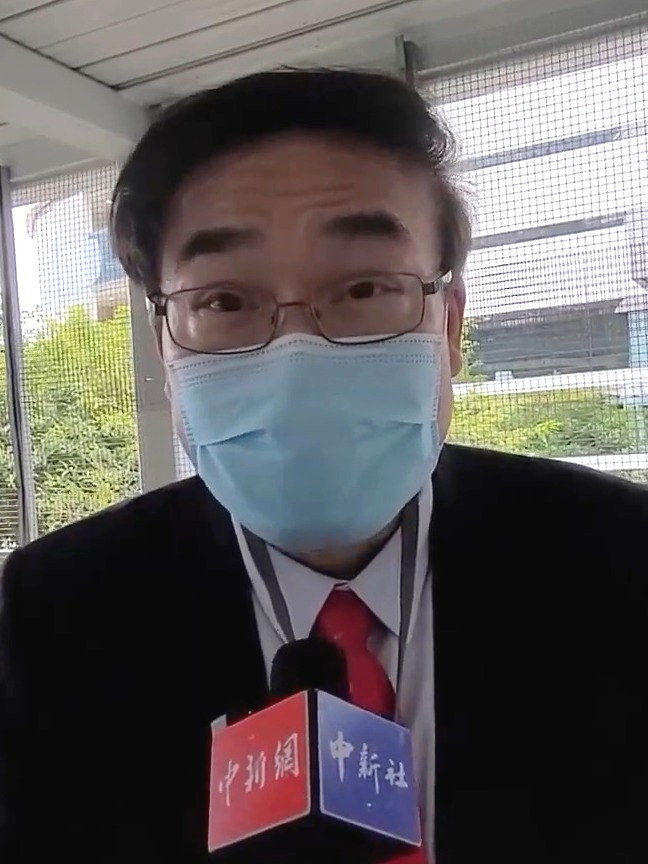
- Dennis Lam in 2021

HKSAR Member of National People's Congress
- Incumbent
- Assumed office 5 March 2008
- Chairman: Wu Bangguo→Zhang Dejiang→Li Zhanshu→Zhao Leji

Member of the Legislative Council of Hong Kong
- Incumbent
- Assumed office 1 January 2022
- Constituency: Election Committee

Personal details
- Born: November 26, 1959 (age 66) Hong Kong
- Spouse: Li Xiaoting
- Children: 2 sons, 1 daughter
- Education: HK & KLN Chiu Chow Public Assn. Secondary School; King's College, Hong Kong; University of Hong Kong
- Occupation: ophthalmologist, businessman

Dennis Lam Shun-chiu, JP (Chinese: 林順潮; born 26 November 1959) is a Hong Kong ophthalmologist, businessman and politician. He has been a Hong Kong deputy to the National People's Congress (NPC) since 2008 and a member of the Election Committee.

== Biography ==
Lam was born in Hong Kong on 26 November 1959 and was educated at the King's College. He graduated from the University of Hong Kong with a Bachelor of Medicine and Bachelor of Surgery in 1984 and became a Fellow of the Hong Kong Academy of Medicine. He became chairman of the Department of Ophthalmology and Visual Sciences at the Chinese University of Hong Kong in 1998.

He founded the C-MER Eye Care Holdings and became the company's chairman and chief executive. By 2017, C-MER Eye Care had eight ophthalmologists in Hong Kong and 24 physicians at Shenzhen hospital which brought him more than HK$80 million revenue in 2016.

He was awarded Ten Outstanding Young Persons Selection of Hong Kong in 1994 and Ten Outstanding Young Persons of the World in 1995. He was first elected to the Election Committee through the Medical Subsector in 1998 and was elected again in 2006. In the 2008 election, he was elected as Hong Kong deputy of the National People's Congress (NPC) in 2008 and became an ex officio member of the Election Committee since 2008. He was picked as one of the torchbearers in the 2008 Summer Olympics torch relay in Hong Kong.

During the 2019 pro-democracy protests, Lam and a few hundred fellow Hong Kong doctors and nurses signed a letter expressing support for the Hong Kong Police Force's crackdown on the protesters, as a counter campaign against a group of medical workers who staged a protest against police brutality.

Lam first ran in the Legislative Council election in 2000 in the Medical functional constituency but was defeated by Lo Wing-lok. He became one of the 51 candidates running in the 40-seat Election Committee in the newly overhauled 90-seat Legislative Council of Hong Kong in the 2021 election.

Though Hong Kong medical schools teach in English, Lam in July 2022 criticized the requirement that English be the language of instruction for a program that recruits doctors from medical schools outside of Hong Kong.

== Personal life ==
He married Li Xiaoting, a participant of the 2004 Miss Chinese International Pageant who is 19 years younger than him.

On 5 January 2022, Carrie Lam announced new warnings and restrictions against social gathering due to potential COVID-19 outbreaks. One day later, it was discovered that Lam attended a birthday party hosted by Witman Hung Wai-man, with 222 guests. At least one guest tested positive with COVID-19, causing all guests to be quarantined. Lam was warned by Legislative Council president Andrew Leung to not attend any meetings until after finishing his last mandatory COVID-19 test on 22 January 2022. However, he decided to attend the meeting on 19 January 2022, against Leung's orders.

In November 2022, he tested positive for COVID-19.

Legislative Council of Hong Kong
New constituency	Member of Legislative Council; Representative for Election Committee; 2022–present	Incumbent
