= Lee Chark-tim =

Lee Chark-tim, GBM (Chinese: 李澤添, 23 December 1934 – 22 May 2007) was the president of the Hong Kong Federation of Trade Unions (HKFTU), the largest trade union and pro-Beijing organ in Hong Kong from 1988 to 2000.

Lee joined the Hong Kong and Kowloon Shoe Trade Workers Union in 1954 and became a member of the Hong Kong Federation of Trade Unions, the pro-Communist trade union in Hong Kong and was a member of the Committee of Hong Kong and Kowloon Compatriots from All Circles for Struggle Against British Hong Kong Persecution during the 1967 leftist riots against the British colonial rule. He was the president of the Federation from 1988 to 2000.

Lee was the Hong Kong deputy to the National People's Congress until his death in 2007. He was also the member of the HKSAR Preparatory Committee which was responsible for the establishment of the HKSAR in 1997 and the Election Committee from 1996 to 2007.

Lee received the Grand Bauhinia Medal (GBM), the highest award by the SAR government in 1999.

Political offices
Preceded by Yeung Kwong	President of the Hong Kong Federation of Trade Unions; 1988–2000	Succeeded by Cheng Yiu-tong
