= Ma Lik =

Hong Kong politician (1952–2007)

Ma Lik GBS, JP
- 馬力

Chairman of the Democratic Alliance for the Betterment and Progress of Hong Kong
- In office 9 December 2003 – 8 August 2007
- Preceded by: Tsang Yok-sing
- Succeeded by: Tam Yiu-chung

Member of the Legislative Council
- In office 1 October 2004 – 8 August 2007
- Preceded by: Cyd Ho
- Succeeded by: Anson Chan
- Constituency: Hong Kong Island

Personal details
- Born: 23 February 1952 Guangzhou
- Died: 8 August 2007 (aged 55) Guangzhou
- Party: DAB
- Spouse: Leung Wai-ching
- Education: Chinese University of Hong Kong
- Profession: Politician; Secondary school teacher Journalist
- Website: malik.hk (in Chinese)

Ma Lik
- Traditional Chinese: 馬力
- Simplified Chinese: 马力
- Jyutping: maa5 lik6
Transcriptions
Standard Mandarin
- Hanyu Pinyin: Mǎlì
Yue: Cantonese
- Jyutping: maa5 lik6
Southern Min
- Hokkien POJ: Má Le̍k

Ma Lik, GBS, JP (Chinese: 馬力; 23 February 1952 – 8 August 2007), was a Legislative Councillor, and was the Chairman of the Democratic Alliance for Betterment of Hong Kong (DAB), a pro-Beijing political party in Hong Kong.

== Education ==
Ma Lik attended the Pui Kiu Middle School. He graduated with a bachelor's degree (with Honours) from the Department of Chinese from United College, Chinese University of Hong Kong.

== Early years ==
He was born in Guangzhou and is of Xiamen, Fujian ancestry. was a teacher in the Pui Kiu Middle School, a pro-Chinese secondary school in Hong Kong. He was a deputy publisher of the Hong Kong Commercial Daily and a local Deputy to the National People's Congress.

== Career ==
Ma was formerly the Secretary General of the DAB, and became the Chairman of the DAB in December 2003 when Jasper Tsang resigned following the poor performance of the party in the November 2003 District Council elections; in those elections, the pro-democratic camp won 150 seats, while DAB secured only 62 seats out of the 205 DAB candidates fielded. Ma was re-elected leader on 25 April 2007.

Ma served in the Basic Law Promotion Steering Committee, Hong Kong Cheshire Home Foundation, and Committee on the Promotion of Civic Education. He was formerly the Chief Editor of the Hong Kong Commercial Daily, Deputy Secretary General of the Hong Kong Basic Law Consultative Committee, Director of Treasure Land International Property Consultants, General Manager of The Hong Kong Institute for Promotion of Chinese Culture, and member of the Selection Committee for the First Government of HKSAR.

Ma was active in the political circles in Hong Kong and Mainland China. Ma wrote weekly and daily columns that appeared in Hong Kong Economic Times, Ming Pao and The Sun.

Ma announced in 2004, prior to standing for election to the Legislative Council, that he had been diagnosed with colon cancer.

== Death ==
He left for treatment in Guangzhou soon after the Tiananmen controversy he sparked (see below). He died on 8 August 2007 at 2 pm in Guangzhou Sun Yat-sen University. His body was transported back to Hong Kong on 11 August 2007. The funeral was held on 23 August. He was cremated according to his wishes.

Ma's death precipitated the 2007 Hong Kong Island by-election, which was won by Anson Chan on 2 December 2007.

== Tiananmen Square Massacre denial furore ==
On 15 May 2007, during an informal meeting Ma had with journalists to discuss political reform, Ma was asked on his views on the "Tiananmen massacre". Ma caused huge furore which hit radio broadcasts, the front pages and editorials of several of the local newspapers, which cited him denying that clampdown of the protesters was a "massacre".

He said of 4000 students at the scene, not everyone was killed; certain student leaders, namely Chai Ling, Wuerkaixi, Feng Chungde, and Hou Dejian, were able to leave the protest site without incident, therefore it is not a massacre. Comments which appeared to cause the most offense related to the alleged army tanks' rolling over protesters, and the PLA's cremation of victim's bodies on-site:

How could people say bodies were minced under the tanks? Has anybody tried mincing meat under tanks? Try doing this with pigs and we will know! ....It takes 1000 °C to cremate bodies. If [the army] could burn bodies this way, there would be no backlogs at the cremation chambers, would there?

Ma questioned whether "Gweilos" (a racial epithet for Caucasians) should be the ones to interpret the truth about Tiananmen, and asserted that Hong Kong was "not mature enough", for believing a massacre took place. Hong Kong lacked patriotism and national identity, and would thus not be ready for universal suffrage until 2022.

Ma also asked the Education Department to define massacre as events where over 4,000 were dead, which would make Tiananmen Square protests of 1989 not a massacre under the new definition. He later withdrew the redefinition request.

=== Responses ===
Democrats and relatives of victims all attacked Ma for his comments. Szeto Wah called Ma "shameless", questioning if killings had to be on the scale of the Nanking Massacre to qualify. He said that "facts written in blood cannot be twisted by lies". Democrat Cheung Man Kwong criticised the attempt at "whitewash", and denounced Ma as "cold-blooded". Student leader of the protest, Wang Dan, said Ma was "utterly devoid of a conscience". Albert Ho said: "Ma's remarks have put salt on the open historical wounds".

Outraged by Ma's comments, 127 "Tiananmen Mothers", led by Ding Zilin, demanded a retraction and a public apology for the humiliation he has heaped on those who died.

The day after the remarks appeared in the headlines, Ma attended an RTHK radio phone-in, where he apologised for making "frivolous and giddy" remarks. Ma claimed he was merely trying to bring the rash claims about the number and manner of deaths reported in the foreign press into proper perspective. He admitted he had perhaps been careless with his words, and would assume full responsibility for what he said. He stopped short of apologising for his comments in general.

One DAB Vice Chairman Tam Yiu Chung defended Ma, but questioned the timing: "people will understand it gradually". Fearing political fallout, another DAB Vice Chairman, Lau Kong Wah (劉江華), distanced the party from Ma, saying that Ma had expressed "a personal opinion". Chan Wing-kee (陳永棋), the head of ATV and CPPCC Standing Committee member declared Ma "a patriot" for his comments. Chan furthermore denounced the perennial Legco debate on the 1989 Tiananmen Square protests and massacre as "unnecessary". Another CPPCC member, Chang Ka-mun, chimed in, saying it was "irrational" to compare it to the Nanjing massacre.

The Central committee of the DAB declined any further action after their meeting on 22 May, stating that Vice-chairman Lau's response was adequate. There was no formal apology.

The annual vigil in memory of Tiananmen attracted an increased turnout in 2007. An estimated 55,000 people, more than a few of whom appear to have been spurred to attend by Ma's comments, packed Victoria Park, up from 44,000 one year earlier.

=== Possible motives ===
Analysts began to comment that Ma's remarks might have been part of a concerted propaganda attempt by Beijing to dampen expectations for universal suffrage.

The power over Hong Kong's political system rests on the central government, not the special administrative region.

The timing of the above statement by NPC Chairman Wu Bangguo to a NPC deputies' meeting in March 2007, is considered important, as Donald Tsang promised a green paper (consultative document) on electoral reform would be published in the summer.

More recently, some local loyalists have issued statements pushing back the date for universal suffrage. Most notably, Cheng Yiu-tong ruled out direct elections for the Chief Executive in 2012. He further warned pro-democracy advocates that universal suffrage in 2017 was unlikely. He blamed the lack of progress on the "intransigence" of democrats, who blocked reform proposals put forward in December 2005. Cheng said that the electoral system would "march on the spot again in 2012".

== Other controversies ==
=== Anti-RTHK ===
On 20 October 1999 the pro-Beijing group fiercely attacked Radio Television Hong Kong (RTHK). Ma Lik publicly attacked RTHK from changing the role from a "watchdog" to a "mouthpiece" of the Hong Kong government.

=== Criticising Hong Kong ===
Ma Lik criticised the rate at which Hong Kong is moving. And that it would take until 2022 for the public to have acquired enough patriotism to accept Communist party rule.

== See also ==
- United front in Hong Kong
- Regina Ip
- Tsang Yok-sing
- Tsang Tak-sing

Legislative Council of Hong Kong
| Preceded by Cyd Ho | Member of Legislative Council; Representative for Hong Kong Island; 2004–2007; Served alongside: Martin Lee, Yeung Sum, Choy So-yuk, Audrey Eu, Rita Fan | Succeeded by Anson Chan |
Party political offices
| Preceded by Jasper Tsang | Chairman of Democratic Alliance for the Betterment of Hong Kong; 2003–2007 | Succeeded by Tam Yiu-chung |
