= Tso Wung-wai =

Hong Kong politician and chemistry professor

Dr. Wung-wai Tso
- Born: 28 February 1941 (age 85); Hong Kong
- Education: Chinese University of Hong Kong; University of Miami; University of Wisconsin-Madison
- Occupation: university professor
- Political party: Hong Kong Progressive Alliance

Dr. Tso Wung-wai (Chinese: 曹宏威; born 28 February 1941), BBS is a Hong Kong politician and chemistry professor. He is an adjunct professor at the Chinese University of Hong Kong, and has also served as a Hong Kong delegate to the National People's Congress of the People's Republic of China.

Tso Wung-wai completed his bachelor's degree in biochemistry at CUHK, took an M.Sc in Miami, and went on to study for his Ph.D. at the University of Wisconsin–Madison. He is a member of the Hong Kong Progressive Alliance (HKPA).

== 2004 Legislative Council election ==
Prior to the 2004 Hong Kong Legislative Council election, the pro-Beijing camp predicted that the competition would be fierce. Some of the HKPA LegCo candidates were persuaded to quit the election, in an attempt to enable Democratic Alliance for the Betterment of Hong Kong (DAB) candidates to stand a higher chances of obtaining LegCo seats. In response to this, David Chu Yu-lin, originally a candidate for the LegCo constituency of the New Territories East, was replaced by Tso. He had a slim chance of obtaining a seat in the election, and unsurprisingly he lost with just 14,174 votes, less than a quarter of any other list in the same constituency.

During his campaigns, Tso gained prominence for his slogans. One of his best-known slogans was 科學求真，智識救港 (literally, Seek the truth with science, and save Hong Kong with knowledge).
