= Maria Tam =

Hong Kong politician

The Honourable Maria Tam GBM GBS CBE JP
- 譚惠珠
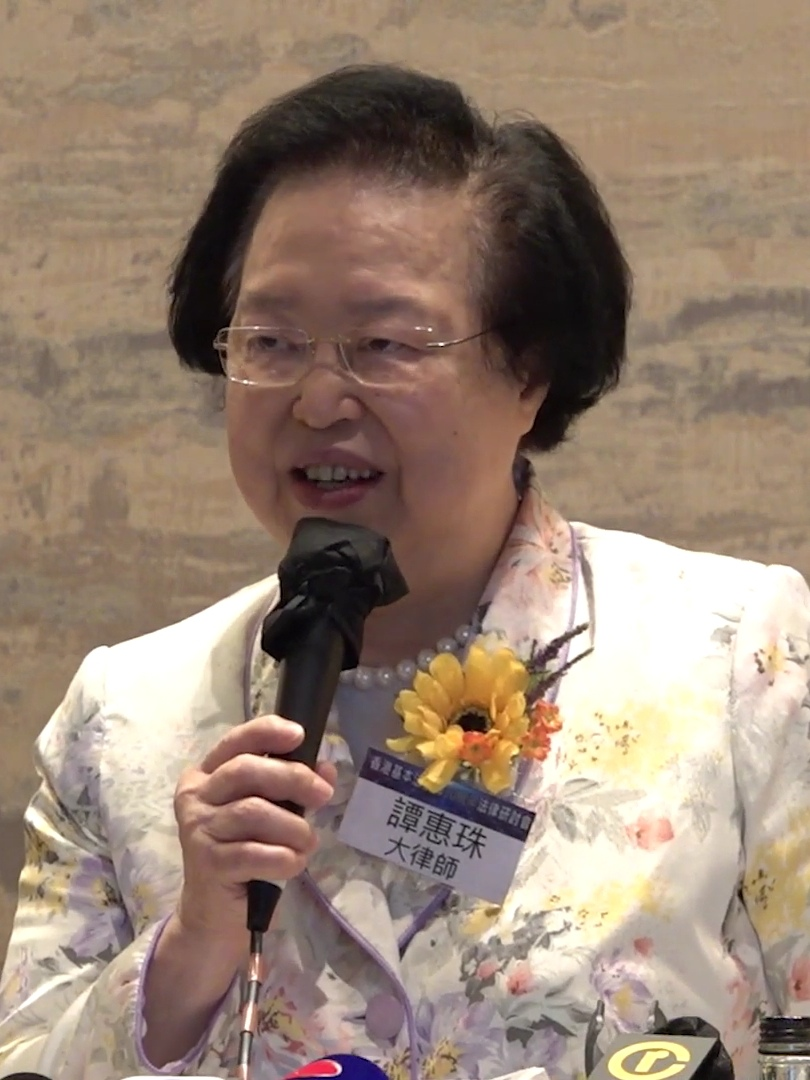

Head of the Hong Kong Delegation to the National People's Congress
- In office March 2013 – 3 March 2018
- Preceded by: Yuen Mo
- Succeeded by: Ma Fung-kwok

Unofficial Member of the Executive Council of Hong Kong
- In office 1 September 1983 – 31 October 1991
- Appointed by: Sir Edward Youde; Sir David Wilson
- Preceded by: Henry Fang
- Succeeded by: Selina Chow

Unofficial Member of the Legislative Council of Hong Kong
- In office 1 September 1981 – 22 August 1991
- Appointed by: Sir Murray MacLehose; Sir Edward Youde; Sir David Wilson
- In office 21 December 1996 – 27 June 1997 (Provisional Legislative Council)

Personal details
- Born: Tam Wai-chu; 2 November 1945 (age 81) Hong Kong
- Party: Progressive Hong Kong Society (1985–90); Liberal Democratic Federation of Hong Kong (1990–97); Hong Kong Progressive Alliance (1997–2005); Democratic Alliance for the Betterment and Progress of Hong Kong (2005–15)
- Education: St. Paul's Co-educational College
- Alma mater: University of London (LLB); Gray's Inn
- Occupation: Barrister

Maria Tam
- Traditional Chinese: 譚惠珠
- Simplified Chinese: 谭惠珠
Transcriptions
Standard Mandarin
- Hanyu Pinyin: Tán Huìzhū
Yue: Cantonese
- Yale Romanization: Tàahm Waih jyū
- Jyutping: Taam^{4} Wai^{6} zyu^{1}

Maria Tam Wai-chu GBM GBS CBE JP (Chinese: 譚惠珠; born 2 November 1945) is a senior Hong Kong politician and lawyer. She is a member of the Committee for the Basic Law of the National People's Congress Standing Committee (NPCSC) since 1997 and the chairman of the Operations Review Committee of the Independent Commission Against Corruption (ICAC) since 2015.

As a successful politician early on, Tam was a member of the four different levels of representative councils, Executive Council, Legislative Council, Urban Council, and Central and Western District Board in colonial Hong Kong in the 1980s. She was also a member of the Hong Kong Basic Law Drafting Committee and took up various appointments from the Beijing government after she departed from the colonial government over the conflict of interest scandal in 1991.

Since 1997, she has become a recognisable spokesperson for the Beijing authorities on constitutional matters such as the interpretations of the Basic Law and constitutional reforms, in which she has always firmly stood and defended all of Beijing's decisions.

== Early colonial career ==
Tam was born on 2 November 1945, in Hong Kong, to Tam Chung, a senior police officer. She graduated from the St. Paul's Co-educational College before she obtained a Bachelor of Laws from the University of London and her admission as a barrister at the Gray's Inn.

She first stepped into politics when she ran in the 1979 Urban Council election as an advocate for women's rights. She was elected with more than 5,000 votes, the third ranked in the election behind veteran Urban Councillors Elsie Elliott and Denny Huang. She was soon appointed to sit on the Legislative Council in 1981. She was one of the recipients of the Ten Outstanding Young Persons Award and was appointed Justice of the Peace in 1982. She became the appointed member of the Central and Western District Board when the board was first created in 1982 under the district administration reform by Governor Murray MacLehose. She became a member of four different levels of representative councils in Hong Kong when she was appointed to the Executive Council, the top advisory body in the colonial government in 1983.

== Transition period ==
During her era the Sino-British negotiations over the Hong Kong sovereignty after 1997 took place. She was one of the members of the delegation of the unofficial members of the Executive and Legislative Councils (UMELC) led by Sir Chung Sze-yuen to London and Beijing to lobby for the interests of the Hong Kong people. In December 1984 when she met with British Prime Minister Margaret Thatcher, she raised the question of the proposed Sino-British Joint Declaration and the "possible incompatibility between the Chinese constitution and the basic law", especially the protection of human rights.

She was appointed by the Beijing government to sit on the Hong Kong Basic Law Drafting Committee in 1985 which was responsible for the drafting of the Basic Law of Hong Kong, the mini-constitution of the post-1997 Hong Kong. She was also awarded an Officer of the Most Excellent Order of the British Empire in 1985, and a Commander of the Most Excellent Order of the British Empire in 1988.

She founded both the Federation of Women Lawyers and the Junior Police Officers' Association. As the colonial government intended to introduce greater representative democracy in the transition period, Tam also founded the Progressive Hong Kong Society (PHKS) in 1985 to participate in the elections. The Progressive Hong Kong Society became the backbone of the Liberal Democratic Federation of Hong Kong (LDF) set by a group of conservative business and professional elites in 1990 for the preparation of the first direct election of the Legislative Council in 1991, of which she became the vice-chairman of the new party.

However, Tam's political career seemed to come to an end when she was found to be in a potential conflict of interest as she was involved in her family's taxi company while also being a member and former chairman of the Transport Advisory Committee. Although she eventually abandoned her shares in the company under pressure, she was not re-appointed by Governor David Wilson in the Executive and Legislative Councils after the incident. A new set of guidelines was also introduced requiring members of the councils to declare their business interests.

== Pro-Beijing career ==
After her departure from the colonial government, she found favour from the Beijing authorities. She accepted various appointments in the run up to 1997, including to the Preparatory Committee for the HKSAR, and as a Hong Kong Affairs Advisor and member of the Selection Committee. She was elected to the Provisional Legislative Council (PLC) installed by Beijing. She subsequently resigned from the PLC to take a seat on the Hong Kong Basic Law Committee of the National People's Congress Standing Committee (NPCSC) in 1997. In that capacity, Tam became one of the most loyal mouthpieces of the Beijing authorities on legal matters, especially in defence of controversial interpretations of the Basic Law and in the constitutional reform debate after 1997.

In 1997, she led the Liberal Democratic Federation to merge with the Hong Kong Progressive Alliance (HKPA), another pro-business pro-Beijing party. In 2005 when the Progressive Alliance was merged into the Democratic Alliance for the Betterment of Hong Kong (DAB), Tam became the party vice-chairman from 2005 to 2007. She also held various public positions at the time, such as member of the Urban Renewal Authority and the Airport Authority Hong Kong.

During the highly controversial national security legislation of the Basic Law Article 23 which later caused a record number of more than 500,000 people demonstration on 1 July 2003, Tam supported the government's decision to pass the bill. She even said that anyone who did not support the Article 23 legislation was not fit to be Chinese. In the constitutional reform debates in 2005 and 2010, Tam led the opposition against the pro-democrats' demand for the universal suffrage of Chief Executive and Legislative Council and defended the government's proposals.

In February 2006, Tam joined the board of subsequently Hong Kong-listed mainland Nine Dragons Paper Holdings Limited, one of the world's largest paperboard manufacturers, whose conditions for workers at its plants were sharply criticised in the 2008 human rights report by the US Congressional-Executive Commission on China and by Hong Kong's Students and Scholars Against Corporate Misbehaviour (SACOM).

== Recent career ==
Tam became the head of National People's Congress Hong Kong delegation from March 2013. On the matter of the universal suffrage of the Chief Executive, Tam said the United Nations' International Covenant on Civil and Political Rights indicated that the right to be elected is not universal. She also suggested that an interpretation of the Basic Law by Beijing could be the last option for determining how universal suffrage could be implemented for the 2017 Chief Executive election. In the 2014 constitutional reform debate, Tam actively opposed the pro-democrats' campaign for the "public nomination" of the Chief Executive, saying that was against the Basic Law, which states that candidates shall be put forward by a nominating committee. She received the Grand Bauhinia Medal (GBM), the highest award under the HKSAR honours and awards system, on 1 July 2013.

In 2015, Tam was appointed chairman of the Operations Review Committee of the Independent Commission Against Corruption (ICAC) by Chief Executive Leung Chun-ying. Under her spell, high-flying head of investigations Rebecca Li Bo-lan was controversially sacked. The sudden dismissal came during Li's enquiry into possible impropriety relating to a $50 million payment made to Leung Chun-ying.

In 2017, Tam was the founding president of the Junior Police Officers’ Association fund which raised over HK$10 million for the families of the seven police officers who were convicted and jailed for two years for beating activist Ken Tsang Kin-chiu at the height of the Occupy protests in 2014.

In November 2020, following the expulsion of 4 pro-democracy lawmakers from the Legislative Council, Tam said that NPCSC decisions are not challengeable, and that any judicial review would almost certainly fail.

Tam supported the arrests of 53 pro-democracy figures in January 2021, and when asked about whether they were doing something illegal, she responded "All I can tell is that it is not 'nothing.' There is something. It is only a matter of whether more evidence is there."

In February 2021, following the 2020 Hong Kong Legislative Council mass resignations, Tam claimed that there were not enough members of the Legislative Council to decide on reforms of the electoral system, and therefore the NPCSC would take charge of such reforms.

In December 2021, during the 2021 Hong Kong legislative election, Tam played down the record-low voter turnout. Tam said that the 30% voter turnout was "quite good" and within her expectations.

In December 2022, after the NPCSC ruled that the Chief Executive could ban foreign lawyers from defending national security cases, in response to Jimmy Lai attempting to hire Tim Owen, Tam supported the NPCSC's decision and said Hong Kong courts were still independent and "no criticism were made against Hong Kong courts at all."

In February 2023, Tam said that Hong Kong was "far more powerful and democratic" than when it was under British rule, and also said that "We have universal suffrage. We can impeach the chief executive. We have checks and balances in respect of the laws or the budget that's been put forward by the executive."

== See also ==
- Rita Fan

Political offices
Preceded by Henry H. O. Luk	Member of Urban Council; 1979–1986	Succeeded by Chow Wai-keung
Legislative Council of Hong Kong
New parliament	Member of Provisional Legislative Council; 1997	Succeeded by Choy So-yuk
Party political offices
Preceded by Lo Chi-keung	Vice-Chairman of Democratic Alliance for the Betterment and Progress of Hong Kong; 2005–2007	Succeeded by Gregory So
National People's Congress
Preceded by Yuen Mo	Head of the Hong Kong Delegation to the National People's Congress; 2013–2018	Succeeded by Ma Fung-kwok
Order of precedence
Preceded by Peter Woo; Recipient of the Grand Bauhinia Medal	Hong Kong order of precedence Recipient of the Grand Bauhinia Medal	Succeeded by Jose Yu; President of the City University of Hong Kong
