= Cheng Yiu-tong =

Member of the Executive Council of Hong Kong

The Honourable Cheng Yiu-tong GBM, JP
- 鄭耀棠
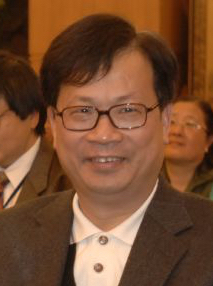

Non-official Member of the Executive Council of Hong Kong
- In office 1 July 2002 – 30 June 2017
- President: Tung Chee Hwa; Donald Tsang; Leung Chun-ying
- Succeeded by: Wong Kwok-kin

HK deputy to the NPC of the PRC
- Incumbent
- Assumed office 17 March 2003
- Congress: 10th National People's Congress; 11th National People's Congress

Member of the Legislative Council of Hong Kong
- In office 17 September 1995 – 30 June 1998
- Constituency: Labour
- Majority: 1995: 684

Personal details
- Born: 14 October 1948 (age 77) British Hong Kong
- Party: Hong Kong Federation of Trade Unions
- Education: Raimondi College; HKU SPACE; Jinan University

Cheng Yiu-tong
- Traditional Chinese: 鄭耀棠
- Simplified Chinese: 郑耀棠
Transcriptions
Standard Mandarin
- Hanyu Pinyin: Zhèng Yàotáng
Yue: Cantonese
- Jyutping: zeng6 jiu6 tong4

Cheng Yiu-tong GBM, JP (Chinese: 鄭耀棠; born 14 October 1948 in Hong Kong) is a non-official member of the Executive Council of Hong Kong. He was appointed as the president of the Hong Kong Federation of Trade Unions in April 2000. He is also the Hong Kong delegate to the National People's Congress of the People's Republic of China.

On 1 July 2015, Cheng was awarded the Grand Bauhinia Medal (GBM), the highest honour of the SAR, in recognition of his contributions to the formulation of labour policies and promotion labour relations in Hong Kong with pragmatic and reasonable approach which helped maintaining the business-friendly environment, and also promoting charity and social services to disadvantaged group and enhancing cooperation with the Mainland.

Political offices
Preceded by Poon Kwong-wai	Chairman of the Hong Kong Federation of Trade Unions; 1986–2000	Succeeded by Wong Kwok-kin
Preceded by Lee Chark-tim	President of the Hong Kong Federation of Trade Unions; 2000–2009	Succeeded by Lam Shuk-yee
New seat	Non-official Member of Executive Council; 2002–2017	Succeeded by Wong Kwok-kin
Legislative Council of Hong Kong
Preceded by Tam Yiu-chung	Member of Legislative Council; Representative for Labour; 1995–1997; Served alongside: Lee Kai-ming	Replaced by Provisional Legislative Council
New parliament	Member of Provisional Legislative Council; 1997–1998	Replaced by Legislative Council
