= Peter Wong Man-kong =

Hong Kong politician and businessman (1949–2019)

Peter Wong Man-kong BBS (Chinese: 王敏剛; pinyin: Wáng Mǐngāng; 9 January 1949 – 11 March 2019) was a politician and businessman from Hong Kong.

== Business career ==
Peter Wong and his younger brother Ronnie were born to Wong Wah-sang, who founded Chung Wah Shipbuilding & Engineering Company. After Peter's graduation from University of California, Berkeley in 1971, he returned to Hong Kong in 1972 to help run the company. Wong's businesses operated projects in Shenzhen and Dongguan.

Wong also served as independent director of various business, including MGM China, New Times Energy, Sino Hotels, and Sun Hung Kai & Company, as well as chairman of several firms, among them MK Corporation, North West Development, Culture Resources Development, Silk Road Hotel Management, and Silk Road Travel Management. He was an executive at the China Chamber of Tourism as well as the Global Tourism Economy Forum, and aided the development of cultural tourism in northwest China. Wong received the Bronze Bauhinia Star in 2003.

== Political career ==
Wong served on the National People's Congress as a representative from Hong Kong from 1993 until his death. During his time in office, he asked for review of the Hong Kong Basic Law, and advised against reliance on foreign judges to hear constitutional legal cases. Wong also proposed several bills relating to national security. He traveled to Beijing on 2 March 2019 to attend the annual meeting of the NPC, only to return to Hong Kong two days later to treat an illness. Wong died on 11 March 2019, at Queen Mary Hospital in Pok Fu Lam, aged 70.
