= List of members of the Election Committee of Hong Kong, 2021–2026 =

Hong Kong Election Committee members in 2021 to 2026

The Sixth Election Committee of the Hong Kong Special Administrative Region was elected in the 2021 Election Committee subsector elections. It serves from 22 October 2021 to 21 October 2026 and is responsible for electing the Chief Executive of Hong Kong in the 2022 election and 40 members of the Legislative Council in the 2021 election and the 2025 election.

Italicised members indicate overlapped membership in different subsectors. ~~Crossed out~~ individuals in ex-officio subsectors indicate their memberships were lost due to various reasons. Brackets after members show the party affiliation of that member and/or the overlapping subsector membership.

The tag Lee behind each member indicates the candidate nominates John Lee in the 2022 election.

== First Sector ==
=== Catering ===
- Chan Wing-on Lee
- Chong Yam-ming (Liberal) Lee
- Rayman Chui Man-wai
- Chung Wai-ping Lee
- Donny Fong Wing-cheung Lee
- Andy Fung Chung-kai Lee
- Leung Chi-wai Lee
- Leung Chun-wah Lee
- Jackie Ling Wai-yip
- Lo Ho-wan
- Tse Po-tat
- Woo Chu Lee
- Dennis Tokuaki Wu Lee
- Yeung Wai Lee
- Yeung Wai-sing (DAB)
- Allan Zeman Lee

=== Commercial (First) ===
- Guy Martin Coutts Bradley
- Chan Sai-ming
- Oscar Chow Vee-tsung Lee
- Eric Fok Kai-shan
- Allen Fung Yuk-lun Lee
- Benjamin Hung Pi-cheng
- Jacob Kam Chak-pui Lee
- Victor Lam Hoi-cheung
- George Leung Siu-kay
- Roy Ng
- Edith Shih Lee
- Douglas Woo Chun-kuen
- Peter Wong Tung-shun (NPC/CPPCC)
- Emil Yu Chen-on
- Yu Pang-chun Lee
- Edmond Yue Kwok-yin Lee
- Betty Yuen So Siu-mai Lee

=== Commercial (Second) ===
- David Chan Pun Lee
- Chong Hok-shan Lee
- Mickey Ko Man-kin Lee
- Lam Ming-sum Lee
- Lau Tit-shing Lee
- Eddie Leung Wai-ho (DAB)
- Eva Li Kam-fun Lee
- Qiu Jianxin
- Tse Yung-hoi Lee
- Ivan Wong Siu-kei
- Lawrence Wong Peng-yen
- Stanley Wong Cho-hang
- Annie Wu Suk-ching Lee
- Charles Yeung Chun-kam Lee
- Derrick Yip Siu-ming
- Johnny Yu Wah-yung Lee
- Yuen Kai-cheong Lee

=== Commercial (Third) ===
- Chiu Kwan
- Chong Wai-ming (DAB) Lee
- Miranda Kwok Pui-fong Lee
- Kwok Yin-lai Lee
- Lau Sung Lee
- Hoey Simon Lee Lee
- Lian Shaodong
- Ng Chor-chu Lee
- San Chung-kam (DAB)
- Shen Hua Lee
- Tan Yueheng Lee
- Wang Lei
- Wong For-yam
- Yau Wai-kwong Lee
- Yiu Loi-man
- Zhao Shuang
- Eric Zhu Liwei Lee

=== Employers' Federation of Hong Kong ===
- Duncan Arthur William Abate
- Chan Wing-kin
- Patrick Healy Lee
- Susanna Hui Hon-hing Lee
- Christopher Kwok Kai-wang Lee
- Kwong Ching-wai Lee
- Wilson Kwong Wing-tsuen
- Richard Li Tzar-kai Lee
- Mak Kin-wah Lee
- Pang Yiu-kai Lee
- Louis Pong Wai-yan Lee
- Patrick Tsang On-yip Lee
- Tsui Yiu-cheung (Liberal)
- Wong Kwong-yiu
- Ann Yeung Yun-chi

=== Finance ===
- Diana Ferreira Cesar
- Ceajer Chan Ka-keung Lee
- Kevin Chan Wing-tak
- Chan Man
- Owens Chan Chi-fai Lee
- Cheng Kin-kong
- Chu Tan-fan
- Fu Kim Lee
- Ip Tsz-kin Lee
- Calvin Kwok Ho-king (NPP)
- Carrie Leung Ka-kai Lee
- Adrian David Li Man-kiu Lee
- David Liao Yi-chien
- Ma Chan-chi Lee
- Stephen Tan Lee
- Tse Siu-ling Lee
- Harold Wong Tsu-hing Lee

=== Financial Services ===
- Henry Chan Lee
- Haywood Cheung Lee
- Ricky Chim Kim-lun Lee
- Jojo Choy Sze-chung Lee
- Chu Yuet-wah (NPC/CPPCC) Lee
- Dai Zhiqiang
- Jeanne Lee Sai-yin Lee
- Robert Lee Wai-wang Lee
- Lee Yiu-sun Lee
- Li Tong
- Lin Xianghong
- Oliver Ng Tse-kuen Lee
- Sun Jianfeng Lee
- Kenny Tang Sing-hing Lee
- Wong Chung-mun Lee
- Xiong Liting Lee
- Daisy Yeung Lee

=== Hotel ===
- Cheng Chi-man Lee
- Dominic Cheng Ka-on
- Winnie Chiu Wing-kwan
- Raymond Chow Wai-kam Lee
- Gobind Naroomal Gary Harilela Lee
- Kuok Hui-kwong Lee
- Leng Yen-thean
- Michael Li Hon-shing
- Alexander Lo Chun-him Lee
- Lo Po-man Lee
- Lu Xiaofeng (NPP)
- Paddy Lui Wai-yu Lee
- Ng Kam-hung
- Johnson Wong Tak-yin Lee
- Peter Wong Chak-fung
- Thomas Jefferson Wu (NPC/CPPCC) Lee

=== Import and Export ===
- Kenneth Chan Kin-nin Lee
- Chan Shiu-shan Lee
- Cheung Ming-man (DAB) Lee
- Chong Shing-hum
- David Ho
- Michael Hui Wah-kit (DAB)
- Kwok Ying-lan Lee
- Jason Joseph Lee Kwong-yee
- Joseph Lee Lee
- Eddy Li Sau-hung Lee
- Pang Chor-fu Lee
- Peter Poon
- Eric Sun Yung-tson
- Ivan Ting Tien-li Lee
- Wan Hang-ping Lee
- Jimmy Wong Chi-ho Lee
- Wong Tsz-wan

=== Industrial (First) ===
- Sunny Chai Ngai-chiu Lee
- Bryant Chan Wan-sing Lee
- Clara Chan Yuen-shan Lee
- Karen Chan Ka-yin
- Ricky Chan Wai-chung Lee
- Daniel Cheng Man-chung Lee
- Jason Felix Chiu Tsz-kiu
- Choi Chun-kit
- Jude Chow Chee-ping
- Steve Chuang Tzu-hsiung Lee
- Anthony Lam Sai-ho
- Gary Lau Sun-tao Lee
- Sze Kam-shing
- Sunny Tan (LegCo)
- Bernie Ting Wai-cheung
- Yip Chung-yin Lee
- Andrew Young Meng-cheung Lee

=== Industrial (Second) ===
- Edward Chan Kwok-man Lee
- Calvin Chan Ka-wai Lee
- Chan Wing-kee Lee
- Marvin Hsu Tsun-fai Lee
- Leung Siu-yin Lee
- Lo Kam-wing Lee
- Robert Lok Pak-keung Lee
- Ma Kai-yum Lee
- Dennis Ng Wang-pun Lee
- Ng Ching-wun
- Ng Kwok-on
- Shi Lop-tak Lee
- Sze Wing-hang
- Wong Chun
- Ellis Wong Wai-hung
- Simon Wong Ka-wo Lee
- Yeung Chi-hung Lee

=== Insurance ===
- Chan Pui-leung Lee
- Chan Yim-kwong Lee
- Chen Zhaonan
- Cheng Kwok-ping
- Kelvin Cheung Kin-keung Lee
- Fung Wai-cheong
- Eric Hui Kam-kwai Lee
- Agnes Koon Woo Kam-oi Lee
- Sammy Lau Siu-mun
- Ronnie Ng Wing-fat
- Jimmy Poon Wing-fai Lee
- Ivan Tam Kwok-wing Lee
- Wilson Tang Chee-ping Lee
- Ellick Tsui Chi-kin
- Andrew Wong Kwai-chuen
- Wong Hon-hing Lee
- Zhan Meiqing (NPP) Lee

=== Real Estate and Construction ===
- Adriel Chan Wenbwo Lee
- Cheng Chi-kong
- Justin Chiu Kwok-hung
- Conrad Fung Kwok-keung
- Hung Cheung-shew
- Keith Graham Kerr Lee
- Adam Kwok Kai-fai Lee
- Irene Lee Yun-lien
- James Lee Hang-wing Lee
- Lee Ka-shing Lee
- Leung Chi-kin Lee
- Lo Ka-shui Lee
- Liu Sing-pang
- Ng Chee-siong (NPC/CPPCC) Lee
- Tsang Hing-cheung Lee
- Robert Wong Yau-chung Lee
- Gordon Wu Ying-sheung Lee

=== Small and Medium Enterprises ===
- Chan Kwok-wai Lee
- Calvin Chau Lee
- Chau Kwok-ming Lee
- Cheng Chung-pong Lee
- Cheung Wai-yue Lee
- Fok Chun-man Lee
- Ho Sai-kit
- Andrew Kwok Chi-wah Lee
- Jones Lo Kam-yam
- Pamela Mak Mei-yee Lee
- William Shum Wai-lam
- Ting Tit-cheung
- Wong Kwong-hon Lee
- Xiao Kai
- Yu Man

=== Textiles and Garment ===
- Chan Oi-ching Lee
- Richard Chan Man-tak
- Shirley Chan Suk-ling Lee
- Raymond Chu Lop-fu Lee
- Katherine Fang Suk-kwan Lee
- Peter Hui Lee
- Eric Lau Pui-kit Lee
- Bosco Law Ching-kit Lee
- Lawrence Leung Ka-yuen Lee
- Barry Lu Lyn-ming Lee
- Albert Ngan Kam-wai Lee
- Shiu King-wah Lee
- Stanley Szeto Chi-yan
- Wong Sau-ching
- Kenny Yang Si-kit
- Benson Yau Lee
- Jennifer Yeung Yin-chi

=== Tourism ===
- Lam Ho-fai
- Lam Sum-lim (DAB)
- Lee Chun-ting Lee
- Lee Sai-wah Lee
- Lo Kai-pong Lee
- Ma Yuk-man
- Ng Hi-on
- Jason Shum Jiu-sang
- So Tsz-yeung
- Sy Chun-ming
- Tommy Tam Kwong-shun Lee
- James Tong Wai-pong
- Tang Man-wai
- Wong Chun-tat Lee
- Gianna Wong Mei-kiu Lee
- Jonathan Wong Tze-wing Lee
- Ronald Wu Keng-hou Lee

=== Transport ===
- Alan Chan Chung-yee Lee
- Chan Kwok-sing
- William Chan Kit Lee
- Cheng Hak-wo Lee
- Ferdinand Fong Chi-fai
- Sunny Ho Lap-kee Lee
- Lai Wing-ming Lee
- Lee Luen-fai
- Roger Lee Chak-cheong Lee
- Li Pok-yan Lee
- Ling Chi-keung Lee
- Stephen Ng Tin-hoi Lee
- Szeto Ka-sing Lee
- Bondy Wen Tsz-kit Lee
- Andy Wong Man-kit Lee
- Matthew Wong Leung-pak Lee
- Yau Ying-wah Lee

=== Wholesale and Retail ===
- Chan Kam-wing Lee
- Cheng Ho-ming Lee
- Cheung Chi-cheung Lee
- Melody Kwok Sze-wai Lee
- Lam Wai-man (Liberal) Lee
- Leung Lai-may
- Leung Yat-cheong (Liberal)
- Li Sheng-chi Lee
- Wendy Li Chi-wai (Liberal) Lee
- Lui Wai-keung
- Ng Wing-yan Lee
- Stanley Sun Tao-hung
- Tsai Chung-fu Lee
- Kenlay Wong Kong-hui Lee
- Wong Siu-kee
- Annie Yau On-yee Lee
- Andrew Kelvin Yu Wai-kit Lee

== Second Sector ==
=== Accountancy ===
Elected:

- Clement Chan Kam-wing Lee
- Mabel Chan Mei-bo Lee
- Chan Wai-dune (DAB) Lee
- Cheng Hong-cheung
- Chow Chi-tong Lee
- Hui Lai-king Lee
- Kwong Tin-lap Lee
- Leung Kwong-kin Lee
- Eugene Liu Lee
- Roy Lo Wa-kei
- Webster Ng Kam-wah Lee
- Sze Lin-tang
- Helen Tang Hoi-lin Lee
- Gary Wong Ho-yuen
- Yip Ngai-shing Lee

Nominated by Association of Hong Kong Accounting Advisors Limited:

- Agnes Chan Sui-kuen Lee
- Edmond Chan Ka-ling Lee
- Jack Chan Hoi
- Raymund Chao Pak-ki Lee
- Kenneth Chen Yung-ngai
- Cheung Wing-han Lee
- Dennis Chow Chi-in Lee
- Chung Wing-yin Lee
- Stephen Fung Sing-hong Lee
- Ho Chiu-ping Lee
- Johnson Kong Chi-how Lee
- Nelson Lam Chi-yuen
- Lee Kin Lee
- Honson To
- Kelvin Wong Tin-yau Lee

=== Architectural, Surveying, Planning and Landscape ===
Elected:

- Jason Chan Chak-wa
- Chan Yuk-ming Lee
- Chow Wai-keung
- Stephen Lai Yuk-fai Lee
- Lesly Lam Lik-shan Lee
- Dicky Lo Chun-wai Lee
- Ho Kui-yip Lee
- Nicholas Ho Lik-chi Lee
- Cherrie Lai Hon-kwan Lee
- Lai Ting-kwok
- Julia Lau Man-kwan Lee
- Bernard Vincent Lim Wan-fung Lee
- Bryant Lu Hing-yiu Lee
- Victor Lui Ho-yuen
- Augustine Wong Ho-ming Lee

Ex-officio:

- Chan Kar-lok Lee
- Johnnie Casire Chan Chi-kau Lee
- Donald Choi Wun-hung
- Chow Chung-kong Lee
- Iris Hoi
- Hui Chi-man Lee
- Jeffrey Kwok Pak-wai Lee
- Lau Chun-kong Lee
- Serena Lau Sze-wan Lee
- Thomas Lee
- Liu Ling-hong Lee
- Anthony Vincent Ng Wing-shun
- Douglas So Cheung-tak Lee
- Tang Hon-kwan
- Wong Chak-yan Lee

=== Chinese Medicine ===
Elected:

- Chan Wing-kwong Lee
- Cheung Kwan-sheung
- Cheung Wai-sang Lee
- Feng Jiu Lee
- Ho Kwok-wai Lee
- Huang Xianzhang
- Lo Ting-yu Lee
- Lyu Aiping Lee
- Miao Jiangxia Lee
- Jack Pang Cheung-hi Lee
- Tsang Chiu-hing Lee
- Wong Kit Lee
- Wong Kwun-ming Lee
- Yeung Cheuk-ming Lee
- Zhu En

Nominated by WFCMS (Hong Kong) Council Members Association Limited:

- Chan Fong-yeung
- Chan Shuk-ying
- Chan Yi-chun
- Cheung Chiu-wai Lee
- Cheung Chun-hoi
- Gan Pei-tzeng Lee
- Hui Fei
- Lam Kar-wing
- Lam Kwok-keung Lee
- Lam Pui-yan Lee
- Li Ka-yan Lee
- Lin Zhixiu Lee
- Wang Huimin Lee
- Wong Shui Lee
- Zheng Sirong

=== Education ===
Elected:

- Langton Cheung Yung-pong Lee
- Chiu Cheung-ki (HKDSSSC) Lee
- Fong Chung-lun
- Ho Hon-kuen Lee
- Koong May-kay Lee
- Nancy Lam Chui-ling
- George Leung Wing-hung
- Liu Fung-heung Lee
- Rex Mok Chung-fai
- Halina Poon Suk-han Lee
- So Ping-fai
- Wong Kam-leung (FEW)
- Wong Kwan-yu (FEW; NPC/CPPCC) Lee
- Yau Siu-hung Lee

Ex-officio:

- Daniel Chan Ching-yan
- Leonard Cheng Kwok-hon Lee
- Moses Cheng Mo-chi Lee
- Stephen Cheung Yan-leung Lee
- Simon Ho Shun-man Lee
- Henry Hu Hung-lick
- Lester Garson Huang
- Joseph Kung Kwong-pui (~~Peter Lau Chiu-yin~~)
- Paul Lam Kwan-sing
- Priscilla Wong Pui-sze Lee (~~Arthur Li Kwok-cheung~~)
- Liao Cheung-sing Lee
- Daisy Shum Kwok-yan (~~Wong Sing-wing~~)
- Tang Ming-wai
- Teng Jinguang
- Rocky Tuan Sung-chi Lee
- Alexander Wai Ping-kong

=== Engineering ===
Elected:

- Aaron Bok Kwok-ming Lee
- Chan Ying-ying
- Chiang Tung-keung Lee
- Reuben Chu Pui-kwan Lee
- Chung Siu-ping
- Thomas Ho On-sing Lee
- Eric Ma Siu-cheung Lee
- Lee Ping-kuen
- Otto Poon Lok-to Lee
- Siu Yin-wai Lee
- Michelle Tang Ming-sum Lee
- Wai Chi-sing Lee
- Duncan Wong Wai-on Lee
- Yim Kin-ping
- Yiu Fan-hung

Ex-officio:

- Rex Auyeung Pak-kuen Lee
- Charles Chan Hing-lung Lee
- Chan Ka-kui
- Chan Kwok-cheung Lee
- Victor Cheung Chi-kong Lee
- Antonio Choi Fung-chung
- Chung Kwok-fai Lee
- Wilton Fok Wai-tung
- Ko Chi-wai Lee
- Joseph Kwan Kai-cho
- Kwok Chun-wah Lee
- Eddie Lam Kin-wing Lee
- Leung Kwong-ho Lee
- So Chak-kwong Lee
- Wong Yuen-fai

=== Legal ===
Elected:

- Cheng Ching
- Lilian Chiang Sui-fook Lee
- Angel Daley Mak Hing-fun (Path of Democracy) Lee
- Fan Hoi-kit Lee
- Sabrina Ho Shuk-ying
- Patrick Hui Man-kit Lee
- Douglas Lam Tak-yip
- Lau Hon-chuen Lee
- Li Lianjun
- Lo Yee-hang Lee
- Anthony Francis Neoh Lee
- Melissa Kaye Pang Lee
- Sylvia Siu Wing-yee
- Ronny Tong Ka-wah (Path of Democracy) Lee
- William Woo Chun-fai

Ex-officio:

- Albert Chen Hung-yee
- Leung Mei-fun (BPA) Lee
- Arthur Li Kwok-cheung Lee
- Johnny Mok Shiu-luen Lee
- Maria Tam Wai-chu (DAB) Lee
- Wong Yuk-shan Lee

Nominated by China Law Society’s HK Council Members Association:

- Kwong Ka-yin Lee
- Lam Ching-chun Lee
- Lin Feng Lee
- Daphne Lo Fung-yee Lee
- Lawrence Ma Yan-kwok Lee
- Ma Yiu-tim Lee
- Stephen Wong Kai-yi
- Wong Ming-fung
- Zhao Yun

=== Medical and Health Services ===
Elected:

- Cheung Hon-ming
- Kathy Cheung Yuk-hung Lee
- Cheung Pui-wah
- Samuel Kwok Po-yin Lee
- David Lam Tzit-yuen (LegCo)
- Lee Ha-yun
- John Leung Lai-yin Lee
- Sigmund Leung Sai-man Lee
- Donald Li Kwok-tung (ex-officio) Lee
- Lo Chung-mau
- Bacon Ng Fung-leung
- Scarlett Pong Oi-lan Lee
- Loletta So Kit-ying
- Tsui Sik-hon Lee
- Apollo Wong Pak-leung Lee

Ex-officio:

- Chan Ka-leung Lee
- Valerie Chu Kok-yan Lee
- Chung Chin-hung Lee
- Fan Hung-ling Lee
- Joseph Lau Wan-yee Lee
- Irene Lee Lai-yin
- Lee Kin-man Lee
- Gabriel Matthew Leung Lee
- Gilberto Leung Ka-kit Lee
- Vitus Leung Wing-hang Lee
- Dick Sung Ming-tat Lee
- Agnes Tiwari Fung-yee Lee
- Philip Tsai Wing-chung (~~Homer Tso Wei-kwok~~) Lee
- Albert Wong Kwai-huen Lee
- Wong Hang-yee

=== Social Welfare ===
Elected:

- Chan Yung (DAB/NTAS; LegCo & NPC/CPPCC)
- Cheng Qing
- Chu Lai-ling (DAB)
- Ha Chung-kin
- Lee Hon-cheung Lee
- Eric Li Ka-cheung (NPC/CPPCC) Lee
- Joseph Man Hung-yee Lee
- Tik Chi-yuen (Third Side)
- Barry Wong Man-sing
- Rosanna Wong Yick-ming (NPC/CPPCC) Lee
- Wong Yat-fung
- Agnes Yeung Law Koon-chui Lee
- Adrian Yip Chun-to Lee
- Yu Sau-chu
- Yuk Tak-fun Lee

Ex-officio:

- Bernard Charnwut Chan Lee
- Chan Shing-bong
- Hui Wing-mau Lee
- Lam Lo
- Jim Lee Chi-shing
- Mang Ngai Lee
- Ngai Sing-leuk
- Peter Pang Chi-wang
- Pan Pey-chyou Lee
- So Cheung-wing (LegCo)
- Tam Chun-kwok
- Tam Kam-kau Lee
- Wong Chor-kei
- Yau How-boa Lee
- ~~SWRB~~ (vacant after declined registration)

=== Sports, Performing Arts, Culture and Publication ===
Elected:

- Chan Chi-kwong Lee
- Chan Wing-wah Lee
- Caroline Cheng Yi (NPC/CPPCC)
- Ko Hak-ling
- Freeman Lau Siu-hong
- Li Ching Lee
- Lo Wing-hung Lee
- Pui Kwan-kay Lee
- William So Wai-leung Lee
- Wan Wai-ling
- Wong Pak-ming Lee
- Wong Po-kee Lee
- Wong Ying-wai
- Derek Yee Tung-sing
- Patrick Yeung Kwok-keung

Nominated by Sports Federation & Olympic Committee of Hong Kong, China:

- William Tong Wai-lun Lee
- Ronnie Wong Man-chiu
- Tony Yue Kwok-leung Lee

Nominated by China Federation of Literary and Art Circles Hong Kong Member Association Limited:

- Stephen Chow Chun-kay Lee
- Thomas Hui To Lee
- Hung Cho-sing
- Lam Tian-xing Lee
- Fredric Mao Lee
- Poon Yiu-ming Lee
- Alan Tam Wing-lun Lee
- Elizabeth Wang Ming-chuen Lee
- Wat Wing-yin Lee

Nominated by Hong Kong Publishing Federation Limited:

- Lee Ka-kui Lee
- Ng Ching-yee Lee
- Jason Wong Jan-hoi

=== Technology and Innovation ===
Elected:

- Gary Cheng Chun-wah
- Rocky Cheng Chung-ngam
- Kenny Chien Kwok-keung
- Duncan Chiu (LegCo)
- Norma Chu Ka-yin
- Chung Kwok-fai Lee
- Hsu Hoi-shan
- Sean Lee Fan-fung
- Dennis Lo Yuk-ming Lee
- Ng Chi-ho Lee
- Hendrick Sin Lee
- Sun Dong Lee
- Yan King-shun Lee
- Yeung Kin-man (NPC/CPPCC)
- Yu Cheung-hoi Lee

Nominated by The Greater Bay Area Association of Academicians:

- Chan Ching-chuen Lee
- Che Chi-ming
- Lee Chack-fan Lee
- Mok Ngai-ming
- So Kwok-fai Lee
- Tang Benzhong
- Tang Tao
- Tsui Lap-chee
- Wong Nai-ching Lee
- Vivian Yam Wing-wah Lee
- Xie Zuowei Lee
- Anthony Garon Yeh
- Yuen Kwok-yung
- Zhao Guochun Lee
- Zhang Mingjie

== Third Sector ==
=== Agriculture and Fisheries ===
- Chan Chi-mang
- Chan Kin-yip Lee
- Chan Pok-chi Lee
- Michael Chan Sheung-chi
- Chan Yun-choi
- Cheng King-man
- Cheng Siu-wah Lee
- Cheung For-yau
- Cheung Kam-yu
- Cheung Siu-keung Lee
- Cheung Tak-shing
- Chong Chung-ping
- Chow Ping-fai
- Chow Yiu-kei
- Chu Kam-ming
- Chui King-hang Lee
- Chung Ching-lin
- Fung Chi-hong
- Fung Kin-chung Lee
- Fung Shu-fat
- Ho Yuk-sang
- Kwok Chi-yau
- John Kwok Hon-wah
- Lai Chuen-tai
- Lai Shing-chai
- Lai Tak-chuen Lee
- Lam Chun-wai Lee
- Galant Lau Kok-fai
- Lau Kam-fung Lee
- Law Kwong-choi
- Lee Choi-wah
- Lee Yat-loong
- Leung Kam-fook
- Leung Koon-ho
- Leung Koon-wah
- Leung Ming-kin
- Leung Ping-kwan
- Eddie Lo Yam-keung
- Lo Lok-tung
- Lo Sui-lam
- Ng Chi-wah
- Ng Wing-yu
- Pang Wah-kan
- Po Ka-ling Lee
- Po Wai-wah
- Sin Wai-lun
- Shea Sheung-kwong
- Tam Chi-ho Lee
- Tang Nuen-fun
- Tsang Kwok-keung
- Tsoi Tak-lee
- Wan Loi-hei
- Wong Cheung-fat
- Wong For-kam
- Wong Kan-chai Lee
- Wong Ping-man
- Wong Pui-kat
- Wong Yuen-tai Lee
- Wu Chun-yuet
- Yeung Sheung-chun Lee

=== Associations of Chinese Fellow Townsmen ===
- Cao Yuanshi
- Chan Hiu-chun
- Chan Lai-on
- Chau Kwan-fei (NPC/CPPCC)
- Che Wang-kin
- Cheng Ah-ling
- Cheung Tai-chiu
- Chu Kin-lan Lee
- Kevin Fan Minhua
- Fong Chun-man
- Fung Kuen-hoi
- Ho Ngai-keung Lee
- Hon Yeung-kwong
- Huang Ziqiang
- Todd Hugh
- Hung Chao-hong Lee
- Hung Han-sang
- Kan Chik-hong
- Ke Wen-hua
- Kung Chun-lung (NPC/CPPCC) Lee
- Janice Kwan Wing-kum
- Lam Hiu-ngai
- Lam Hung-san
- Lam Kin-ping
- Lau Kuen
- Lee Fung-king
- Lee Tak-lun Lee
- Leung Lun
- Li Chun
- Lin Chun-yan
- Ginny Man Wing-yee Lee
- Mok Ching-suen
- Mok Hoi-to Lee
- Mung Mei-ling
- Ng Chit-yam Lee
- Ng Choi-wah Lee
- Volais Ng Kam-lung
- Daryl Ng Win-kong Lee
- Ng Wai-kuen
- Ng Woon-yim (NPC/CPPCC) Lee
- Shum Siu-hung
- Siu Muk-lung
- Sze Nang-sze
- Tai Tak-fung Lee
- Tang Anying Lee
- Tang Yau-choi Lee
- Tsang Ting-fat
- Tsoi Man Lee
- Wong Cho-shi
- Wong Choi-hing Lee
- Wong Ka-wai Lee
- Wong Shu-yui
- Wong Sing-lam
- Wu Yingpeng
- Ying Bingnan
- Kenneth Yip Kat-kong
- Yiu Mau-lung Lee
- Yu Pui-tai
- Yun Haiqing
- Yung Bing

=== Grassroots Associations ===
- Chan Hoi-wing (DAB)
- Chan Kam-lam (DAB) Lee
- Chan Kin-ping
- Chan Leiming Lee
- Chan Mo
- Chan Shun-shun
- Chan Shun-yu
- Chan Wai-ming (DAB)
- Chan Wai-ping
- Chan Yin-shan Lee
- Chau Chuen-heung (DAB)
- Cheung Chung-chit
- Cheung Hok-ming (DAB) Lee
- Chiu Sau-han
- Chiu Wah-kuen
- Cho Wui-hung (BPA)
- Chuk Hing-toi (DAB)
- Fan Rongzhang
- Maisy Ho Chiu-ha Lee
- Ho Hon-man (DAB)
- Huang Changran
- Huang Guoping
- Jin Ling
- Kwok Yi-chit
- Vincent Lam Tak-hing
- Lau Kong-wah (DAB)
- Law King-shing (DAB)
- Dominic Lee Tsz-king (NPP) Lee
- Lee Yuet-man
- Li Chi-fung
- Li Yiping
- Lin Ho-man
- Lin Xiaodong
- Lin Xiaohui Lee
- Liu Tianni
- Ng Man-kit
- Ng Sing-wah
- Pan Sutong (NPC/CPPCC) Lee
- Pang Siu-kei (DAB)
- Shu Xin
- So Lai-chun
- Sung Kai-ming
- Tsang Tak-sing
- Tse Wing-hang
- Tsoi Wing-sing
- Tsui Li Lee
- Tung Ching-sai
- Wan Tin-chong Lee
- Wan Wo-fai (DAB) Lee
- Wong Chun-hung
- Henry Wong Chun-fai
- Wong Chun-ping
- Wong Kwun
- Wong Kwun-keong
- Wong Wai-kit Lee
- Wong Yip-kwan
- Wu Chi
- Yang Wing-kit (LegCo)
- Benny Yeung Tsz-hei (DAB)
- Yu Chi-wing

=== Labour ===
- Lewis Chan Siu-wah (FTU)
- Chan Man Luen-ying (FLU) Lee
- Chan Man-wai (FTU)
- Chan Tang-yuen (FTU) Lee
- Chau Siu-chung (LegCo)
- Cheng Sau-kuen (FLU)
- Cheung Hoi-wing (FTU)
- Cheung Kam-ling (FTU)
- Cheung Kwai-ying (FTU)
- Ching Ngon-lai (FTU)
- Chu Hon-chung (FLU)
- Chu Yuk-ching
- Fan Keung (FTU)
- Fung Yuk-fung (FTU)
- Hui Pui-ting (FTU)
- Hung Kai-ming (FTU)
- Ip Wai-ming (FTU)
- Kong Wai-chau (FTU)
- Kwok Hing-wun (FTU) Lee
- Lam Chi-ting (FTU)
- Lam Kam-yi (FTU)
- Lam Koon-leung (FTU)
- Lam Tin-fu (FTU)
- Lam Wai-kong (FTU)
- Lee Che-kin (FTU) Lee
- Lee Fong-chung (HKSGOA) Lee
- Lee Kwong-yu (FTU)
- Lee Sau-king (FLU) Lee
- Lee Wai-man (FTU)
- Juan Leung Chung-yan (FTU) Lee
- Li Tat-wai (FTU) Lee
- Li Wing-foo (FTU)
- Lo Chi-san (FTU)
- Lui Kit-han (FLU)
- Ma Chi-sing (FTU) Lee
- Ma Kwong-yu (FTU)
- Mak Siu-fun (FLU)
- Ng Chi-man
- Ng Wai-yee (FLU)
- So Pak-tsan (FTU)
- Tam Chi-chung (FLU)
- Tam Kam-lin (FLU) Lee
- Tong Chung-man (FTU)
- Tong Kang-yiu (FTU)
- Tsang Chi-man (FTU)
- Tse King-wa (FTU)
- Tse Oi-hung (FTU) Lee
- Tse Wang-yu (FTU)
- Tsoi Chung-kin (FTU)
- Peter Wong Kit-hin (FTU) Lee
- Wong Kwok-keung (FTU)
- Wong Lai-ping (FTU)
- Wong Ping (FTU)
- Wong Wang-yip (FTU)
- Wu Ming-fung Lee
- Yang Kaiqiang (FTU)
- Yau Yiu-shing (FTU)
- Yeung Lin-pik (FTU)
- Yip Lau-ching (FTU)
- Young Wing-fai (FTU)

=== Religious ===
Nominated by Catholic Diocese of Hong Kong:

- Alan Chiu Pit-hong Lee
- Chow Siu-hung Lee
- Peter Ho Hing-lim Lee
- Steve Hung Yik-kwan Lee
- Lee Kwai-sang Lee
- Agnes Mak Tang Pik-yee Lee
- Christopher Tse Chin Lee
- Janet Tse Pui-yi Lee
- Veronica Tse Ching Lee
- Wong Him Lee

Nominated by Chinese Muslim Cultural and Fraternal Association:

- Cheung Tai-yan Lee
- Harry Ha Kay-wai
- Lau Chi-tat Lee
- Ilyas Mohammad Lee
- Saeeduddin
- Sat Che-sang Lee
- Sze-to Lang Lee
- Ali Tuet Sui-hong
- Sheila Jamillah Wong Hong-kwan Lee
- Xingben Uthman Yang Lee

Nominated by Hong Kong Christian Council:

- Jonathan Winston Ah-weng
- Chung Kin-kai Lee
- Cheung Ang Siew-mei Lee
- Daniel Ho Hon-yin Lee
- Leung Shuk-yee
- Li Ping-kwong Lee
- Wilson Mok Yu-sang Lee
- So Yiu-por Lee
- Yick Kar-lim Lee
- Yu Chung-leung

Nominated by the Hong Kong Taoist Association:

- Chan Kwok-chiu Lee
- Hau Wing-cheong Lee
- Ip Yeng-kwen
- Lam Chek-yau Lee
- Lee Yiu-fai Lee
- Leung Tak-wah Lee
- Danny Lo Ching-yuen Lee
- Francis Wong Shing-yick Lee
- Wong Kin-wing
- Yip Wing-shing Lee

Nominated by the Confucian Academy:

- Chiang Yu-tui Lee
- Kevin Hung Dingteng Lee
- Hung Ting-chiu
- Lee Man-bun
- Ng Hon-leung
- Anson Or Yiu-wah Lee
- Tong Yeuk-fung Lee
- Tong Yun-kai Lee
- Mindy Wong Tsz-wing Lee
- Yeung Man-lee

Nominated by the Hong Kong Buddhist Association:

- Ho Tak-sum
- Law Miu-chi Lee
- Lee Ka-cheung
- Sik Hongming
- Sik Hin-hung Lee
- Sik Ku-tay Lee
- Sik Ng-cong Lee
- Sik To-ping Lee
- Sik Yin-chi Lee
- Tan Chunhua Lee

== Fourth Sector ==
=== Members of the Legislative Council (ex officio) ===
6th Legislative Council (until 31 December 2021)

- Chan Chun-ying
- Chan Hak-kan (DAB/NTAS)
- Chan Han-pan (DAB/NTAS)
- Chan Kin-por
- ~~Pierre Chan~~ (Did not register)
- ~~Cheng Chung-tai~~ (Disqualified)
- Vincent Cheng Wing-shun (DAB)
- Christopher Cheung Wah-fung (BPA)
- Cheung Kwok-kwan (DAB)
- Tommy Cheung Yu-yan (Liberal)
- Chiang Lai-wan (DAB)
- Holden Chow Ho-ding (DAB)
- Chung Kwok-pan (Liberal)
- Ho Kwan-yiu
- Steven Ho Chun-yin (DAB)
- Regina Ip Lau Suk-yee (NPP)
- Kwok Wai-keung (FTU)
- Jeffrey Lam Kin-fung (BPA)
- Kenneth Lau Ip-keung (BPA)
- Lau Kwok-fan (DAB)
- Starry Lee Wai-king (DAB)
- Andrew Leung Kwan-yuen (BPA)
- Priscilla Leung Mei-fun (BPA; Legal)
- Leung Che-cheung (DAB/NTAS)
- Martin Liao Cheung-kong
- Lo Wai-kwok (BPA)
- Luk Chung-hung (FTU)
- Ma Fung-kwok (NCF)
- Alice Mak Mei-kuen (FTU)
- Ng Wing-ka (BPA)
- Wilson Or Chong-shing (DAB)
- Poon Siu-ping (FLU)
- Elizabeth Quat (DAB)
- Abraham Shek Lai-him (BPA)
- Shiu Ka-fai (Liberal)
- Michael Tien Puk-sun (Roundtable)
- Paul Tse Wai-chun
- Tony Tse Wai-chuen
- Wong Kwok-kin (FTU)
- Wong Ting-kwong (DAB)
- Frankie Yick Chi-ming (Liberal)
- Yiu Si-wing
- Yung Hoi-yan (NPP)

7th Legislative Council (since 1 January 2022)

- Andrew Leung Kwan-yuen (BPA)
- Tommy Cheung Yu-yan (Liberal) Lee
- Jeffrey Lam Kin-fung (BPA) Lee
- Starry Lee Wai-king (DAB) Lee
- Chan Hak-kan (DAB) Lee
- Chan Kin-por Lee
- Priscilla Leung Mei-fun (BPA; Legal)
- Regina Ip Lau Suk-yee (NPP) Lee
- Tony Tse Wai-chuen Lee
- Paul Tse Wai-chun Lee
- Michael Tien Puk-sun (Roundtable)
- Steven Ho Chun-yin (DAB) Lee
- Frankie Yick Chi-ming (Liberal) Lee
- Ma Fung-kwok (NCF) Lee
- Chan Han-pan (DAB) Lee
- Alice Mak Mei-kuen (FTU) Lee
- Kwok Wai-keung (FTU) Lee
- Elizabeth Quat (DAB) Lee
- Martin Liao Cheung-kong Lee
- Lo Wai-kwok (BPA) Lee
- Jimmy Ng Wing-ka (BPA) Lee
- Junius Ho Kwan-yiu Lee
- Holden Chow Ho-ding (DAB) Lee
- Shiu Ka-fai (Liberal) Lee
- Yung Hoi-yan (NPP/Civil Force) Lee
- Chan Chun-ying Lee
- Cheung Kwok-kwan (DAB) Lee
- Luk Chung-hung (FTU) Lee
- Lau Kwok-fan (DAB) Lee
- Kenneth Lau Ip-keung (BPA) Lee
- Vincent Cheng Wing-shun (DAB) Lee
- Doreen Kong Yuk-foon Lee
- Chu Kwok-keung (FEW) Lee
- Stanley Li Sai-wing (DAB; Area Committee)
- Hoey Simon Lee (Commercial (Third))
- Robert Lee Wai-wang (Financial Service)
- Dominic Lee Tsz-king (NPP; Grassroot)
- Lee Chun-keung (Liberal) Lee
- Tik Chi-yuen (Third Side; Social Welfare)
- Stanley Ng Chau-pei (FTU; NPC/CPPCC) Lee
- Johnny Ng Kit-chong (NPC/CPPCC) Lee
- Chau Siu-chung (FLU) Lee
- Chow Man-kong Lee
- David Lam Tzit-yuen Lee
- Lam Chun-sing (FLU) Lee
- Lam So-wai (PP) Lee
- Nixie Lam Lam (DAB) Lee
- Nelson Lam Chi-yuen Lee
- Dennis Lam Shun-chiu (NPC/CPPCC) Lee
- Lam San-keung Lee
- Andrew Lam Siu-lo Lee
- Duncan Chiu Lee
- Yiu Pak-leung Lee
- Wendy Hong Wen Lee
- Sun Dong (Technology and Innovation)
- Dennis Leung Tsz-wing (FTU) Lee
- Leung Man-kwong (KWND; Area Committee)
- Edward Leung Hei (DAB) Lee
- Kenneth Leung Yuk-wai Lee
- Chan Yuet-ming (Heung Yee Kuk)
- Rock Chen Chung-nin (DAB; NPC/CPPCC) Lee
- Chan Pui-leung (Insurance)
- Chan Yung (DAB) Lee
- Sunny Tan Lee
- Judy Chan Kapui (NPP) Lee
- Maggie Chan Man-ki (NPC/CPPCC) Lee
- Chan Siu-hung Lee
- Chan Hoi-yan Lee
- Joephy Chan Wing-yan (FTU) Lee
- Chan Hok-fung (DAB) Lee
- Gary Zhang Xinyu (NPHK) Lee
- Lillian Kwok Ling-lai (DAB) Lee
- Benson Luk Hon-man (BPA) Lee
- Wong Yuen-shan Lee
- Kennedy Wong Ying-ho (DAB; NPC/CPPCC) Lee
- Edmund Wong Chun-sek (DAB) Lee
- Kingsley Wong Kwok (FTU; NPC/CPPCC) Lee
- Yang Wing-kit Lee
- Peter Douglas Koon Ho-ming Lee
- Tang Fei (FEW) Lee
- Tang Ka-piu (FTU) Lee
- Lai Tung-kwok (NPP; NPC/CPPCC) Lee
- Lau Chi-pang Lee
- Kenneth Fok Kai-kong (NPC/CPPCC) Lee
- Louis Loong Hon-biu Lee
- Ngan Man-yu (DAB) Lee
- Carmen Kan Wai-mun Lee
- Tan Yueheng (Commercial (Third))
- So Cheung-wing Lee
- Yim Kong Lee

=== Heung Yee Kuk ===
- Chan Chi-wing Lee
- Chan Yuet-ming Lee
- Ching Chan-ming
- Chow Yuk-tong
- Ho Siu-kei
- Lam Wai-keung Lee
- Lam Yick-kuen Lee
- Lau Chi-pang (LegCo)
- Lau Kai-hong Lee
- Lee Koon-hung Lee
- Li Kwok-fung
- Li Yiu-ban
- Jimmy Man Mei-kwai
- Mok Kam-kwai Lee
- Shum Ho-kit Lee
- Tang Che-keung Lee
- Tang Ho-nin
- Tang Sui-man
- To Kwai-ying
- Wai Kwok-hung Lee
- Wan Yuet-kau
- Wong Chau-ping
- Ken Wong Hon-kuen
- Wong Man-hon
- Yau Kam-ping Lee
- Yu Hon-kwan Lee
- Yung Chi-ming

=== Representatives of Associations of Hong Kong Residents in the Mainland ===
- Chan Sao-iam Lee
- Chan Sin-ming
- Terence Chan Ho-wah
- Chan Yau-shing
- Chan Yin-hon
- Cheung Pang Lee
- Paul Cheung Lap Lee
- Wilber Sonny Doo Yuen-sun
- Eric Fung Kwok-yau
- Hung Ching-lung
- Hung Mei-yung Lee
- Lam Wa
- Eddie Law Kar-chung Lee
- Lau Chi-keung Lee
- Cecil Lee Chen-chou Lee
- John Ma Hung-ming Lee
- Pun Ka-yeung Lee
- Amy Siu Wai-kwan
- Song Dong Lee
- Tong Yiu-kwong
- Conway Wong Pit-man
- Wong Ping-fung Lee
- Wong Tung-ming Lee
- Wong Yau-kuen
- Wu Yiu-fung
- Yau Wai-ming Lee
- Yeung Leung-yin

=== Representatives of Members of Area Committees, District Fight Crime Committees, and District Fire Safety Committees of Hong Kong and Kowloon ===
- Chan Chan-piu Lee
- Judy Chan Kapui (NPP; LegCo)
- Chan Kwok-wai
- Chan Lai-fong Lee
- Chan Nam-po Lee
- Nelson Chan Wah-yu Lee
- Chan Tung Lee
- Chan Yan-yiu
- Chan Yuk-kit (DAB)
- Chen Meiyan
- Cheng Keung-fung (FPHE)
- Cheng Shing-fung Lee
- Cheung Chi-chung
- Cheung Ki-tang (DAB) Lee
- Cheung Pui-kong (DAB)
- Cheung Yiu-pan (DAB)
- Ching Lei-yuen
- Kitty Chiu Fung-yi
- Peter Chow Chiu-sheung Lee
- Chu Lap-wai (DAB) Lee
- Chu Yuk-lung
- Chung Chak-fai
- Chung Kong-mo (DAB)
- Chung Tsi-kuen Lee
- Ho Hin-ming (Liberal) Lee
- Hung Chiu-kwan
- Hung Chiu-wah (DAB) Lee
- Hung Kam-in (DAB) Lee
- Chris Ip Ngo-tung (DAB) Lee
- Kan Chi-ho (DAB) Lee
- Kan Ming-tung (FTU)
- Kwok Yiu-wai
- Joe Lai Wing-ho (DAB)
- Sunny Lai Wing-chun
- Lam Fung
- Lam Tsz-hung (NPP)
- Lam Wing-cheung
- Lam Yau-pik (Liberal) Lee
- Lam Yuk-chun
- Lau Hing-yeung (DAB) Lee
- Lau Pui-shan Lee
- Lau Pui-yuk (DAB)
- Lau Wai-kwong Lee
- Lee Ching-har (DAB)
- Lee Chun-keung (Liberal; LegCo)
- Lee Pik-yee
- David Leung Kwok-hung (FTU)
- Leung Kui-hoi Lee
- Leung Man-kwong (BPA) Lee
- Leung Sze-wan Lee
- Leung Tang-fung (DAB)
- Li Hon-hung
- Li Lee
- Li Siu-yung Lee
- Li Tak-hong (DAB) Lee
- Lin Wei-qiao Lee
- Lo Wing-sze Lee
- Lu Hiu-tung
- Lui Hung-pan (FTU)
- Lui Tung-hai
- Wendy Lui Kai-lin
- Ng Po-keung (DAB)
- Ngan Man-yu (DAB; LegCo)
- Pun Kwok-wah (DAB) Lee
- Qiu Songqing Lee
- Tam Siu-cheuk (DAB)
- Tang Siu-mui
- Tsang Fung-chu Lee
- Tsang Yiu-tong
- Wong Choi-lap (DAB)
- Wong Chung-leung
- Wong Tat-tung (DAB)
- Wong Tsz-shing Lee
- Yeung Ka-shing Lee
- Deannie Yew Yat-wa
- Yuen Kwok-keung (DAB)

=== Representatives of Members of Area Committees, District Fight Crime Committees, and District Fire Safety Committees of the New Territories ===
- Au Chi-fai
- Paul Au Chi-on Lee
- Chan Cho-leung (BPA) Lee
- Chan Ka-fai Lee
- Chan Kwok-kai
- Chan Man-chau
- Chan Oi-yi Lee
- Chan Siu-kuen
- Chan Wai-yuek
- Chan Yau-hoi (FTU) Lee
- Daniel Cham Ka-hung
- Andy Cheng Yin-kwan
- Cheng Lam
- Cheung Chin-pang
- Cheung Yin-nam
- Chiu Man-leong (DAB)
- Chong Kin-shing
- Chong Yuen-tung (DAB) Lee
- Chu Ho-yin
- Deng Kairong Lee
- Sammi Fu Hiu-lam (NPP)
- Kam Man-fung (NPP) Lee
- Kan Siu-kei Lee
- Ki Lai-mei
- Ko Wai-kei (DAB) Lee
- Koo Yeung-pong (DAB) Lee
- Kot Siu-yuen (FTU)
- Kwok Chun-sing
- Kwong Yuet-sum
- Lai Sum (DAB)
- Lam Chor-chiu
- Lam Kong-kwan (DAB)
- Lam Yu-sing (NPP/CF) Lee
- Lau Chee-sing Lee
- Lau Hing-wah
- Lau Shun-ting (DAB)
- Lothar Lee Hung-sham (FTU)
- Lee Shing-put
- Raymond Leung Cheong-ming
- Leung Kar-ming (DAB)
- Li Guanhua
- Philip Li Ka-leung (DAB) Lee
- Li Sai-wing (DAB) Lee
- Ling Wai-hon
- Lo Siu-kit Lee
- Lo Yuen-ting (DAB) Lee
- Lui Kin (DAB) Lee
- Lung Shui-hing (DAB)
- Ma Shuk-yin (DAB)
- Donald Man Ka-ho Lee
- Man Yu-ming (FPHE)
- Mo Shing-fung (DAB) Lee
- Mung Kin-keung
- Ng Chiu-hung
- Ng Ngai-wing
- Ng Sze-fuk (DAB)
- Poon Chi-shing (DAB) Lee
- Pun Kwok-shan (NPP/CF) Lee
- Siu Long-ming (DAB)
- Sung Ka-woon Lee
- Tang Cheuk-him
- Ronnie Tang Yung-yiu
- To Sheck-yuen Lee
- Tsang Kwok-ka
- Tsui Fan (FTU)
- Wah Mei-lung
- Wan Ka-ming
- Warwick Wan Wo-tat (FTU/DAB) Lee
- Albert Wong Shun-yee Lee
- Wong Pik-kiu (DAB) Lee
- Wong Wai-shing
- Wu Cheuk-him (DAB)
- Wu Yuk-chi Lee
- Yau Tai-tai Lee
- Yau Yuk-lun
- Yip Cheung-chun
- Yip Man-pan (DAB)
- Yiu Ka-chun (NPP/CF) Lee
- Yiu Kwok-wai (FTU)
- Yiu Ming (DAB)

== Fifth Sector ==
=== HKSAR Deputies to the NPC and HKSAR Members of the National Committee of the CPPCC (ex officio) ===
13th National People's Congress and Chinese People's Political Consultative Conference (until 2022):

- Au Weng-hei Lee
- Cai Yi
- Chak Mei-hing
- Albert Chan Sun-chi
- Chan Cheuk-hay Lee
- Bunny Chan Chung-bun
- Eliza Chan Ching-har Lee
- Jackie Chan Kong-sang
- Maggie Chan Man-ki
- Margaret Chan Fung Fu-chun Lee
- Nicholas Chan Hiu-fung (Liberal)
- Chao Kee-tung Lee
- Chau Hau-lap
- Chau On Ta-yuen (DAB) Lee
- Chen Hong-tian
- Rock Chen Chung-nin (DAB)
- Cheng Yiu-tong (FTU) Lee
- Charles Cheung Hok-sau
- Cheung Chi-kong Lee
- Cheung Chung-kiu Lee
- Cheung King
- Cheung Kwok-wing Lee
- Cheung Man-kwong Lee
- Christopher Cheung Wah-fung Lee
- David Chiu Lee
- Chiu Tung-ping
- Karson Choi Ka-tsan Lee
- Choi Koon-shum
- Alan Chong Shaw-swee (DAB)
- Anthony Chow Wing-kin Lee
- Choy So-yuk (DAB)
- Kenneth Chu Ting-kin
- Chu Ming-chuan Lee
- Nancy Chu Ip Yuk-yu Lee
- Chu San-shing
- Timpson Chung Shui-ming (DAB)
- Ian Fok Chun-wan Lee
- Kenneth Fok Kai-kong
- David Fong Man-hung Lee
- Fu Kwan
- Daniel Richard Fung
- Fung Dan-lai
- Gunter Gao Lee
- Gao Yanming
- Charles Ho Tsu-kwok Lee
- Ho Yat-sum
- Alan Hoo (Liberal) Lee
- Herman Hu Shao-ming Lee
- Huang Shaokang
- Hui Hon-chung Lee
- Hui Ka-yan
- Marvin Hung Ming-kei
- Hung Wai-man (BPA)
- Ip Kwok-him (DAB) Lee
- Ip Shun-hing (DAB) Lee
- Tony Kan Chung-nin
- Kei Hoi-pang Lee
- Leo Kung Lin-cheng Lee
- Leung Che-cheung Lee
- Margaret Ko Lee
- Ko Pui-shuen Lee
- Ko Wing-man Lee
- Kong Tak-ho Lee
- Kuok Khoon-chen Lee
- Peter Kung Lee
- Cally Kwong Mei-wan
- Paul Kwong Lee
- Raymond Kwok Ping-luen Lee
- Lai Tung-kwok (NPP)
- Lam Chik-tsan
- Dennis Lam Shun-chiu
- Lam Lung-on
- Peter Lam Kin-ngok (BPA) Lee
- Lam Shuk-yee (FTU) Lee
- Lam Tai-fai Lee
- Lam Ting-keung
- Lau Chun-fui Lee
- Lau Ka-keung
- Kaizer Lau Ping-cheung Lee
- Lau Yu-leung
- Lee Ka-kit
- Raymond Lee Man-chun
- Sammy Lee Wai-sum Lee
- Vincent Marshall Lee Kwan-ho
- Lee Yin-yee
- Leung Chun-ying Lee
- Leung Leung-shing Lee
- Leung Moon-lam
- Brian David Li Man-bun Lee
- Li Kuo-hsing
- Li Ming
- Charles Li Xiaojia Lee
- Li Shan Lee
- Li Sing-tui
- Li Shui Lee
- Tommy Li Ying-sang Lee
- Li Tze-leung (Liberal) Lee
- Victor Li Tzar-kuoi Lee
- Li Weibin
- Li Yi
- Li Yinquan
- David Lie A Cheong Tai-chong Lee
- Ling Yu-shih Lee
- Changle Liu
- Jason Lo Ip-leung Lee
- Lo Siu-kit (DAB)
- Lo Sui-on Lee
- Francis Lui Yiu-tung
- Lui Tim-leung Lee
- George Lung Chee-ming Lee
- Ma Ho-fai
- Hoffman Ma Ho-man Lee
- Man Lai-hung
- Ng Chau-pei (FTU)
- Ng Kit-chong
- Ng Leung-ho Lee
- Ng Leung-sing
- Ng Ling-ling
- Paul Ng Yuk-yeung
- Ngai Ming-tak (DAB)
- Pauline Ngan Po-ling
- Pak Shui-ching Lee
- Thomas Pang Cheung-wai (DAB) Lee
- Chanchai Ruayrungruang
- Shek Hon-kei
- Shen Nan-peng Lee
- Shie Tak-chung Lee
- Sit Kwong-lam Lee
- Thomas So Shiu-tsung Lee
- Suen Siu-man Lee
- Sze Ching-lau Lee
- Irons Sze (DAB) Lee
- Sze Wei-hung (Liberal)
- Tai Hay-lap Lee
- Tam Chi-yuen Lee
- Tam Yiu-chung (DAB) Lee
- Henry Tan (BPA) Lee
- Tang Ching-ho Lee
- Henry Tang Ying-yen
- Tang King-shing Lee
- Richard Tang Yat-sun Lee
- Timothy Tong Wai-cheung Lee
- Ricky Tsang Chi-ming (DAB)
- Tsang Wai-hung Lee
- Tse Chun-ming Lee
- Tsim Hung-leung
- Tso Fai
- Tu Hai-ming Lee
- Tu Hui-long
- Tung Chi-hwa
- Wang Guiguo
- Wang Ming-fan
- Wang Ya-nan
- Michael Woo Kim-kong
- Bonnie Wong Cho-kei Lee
- Wong Chi-leung
- Wong Cho-bau
- David Wong Yau-kar
- Kennedy Wong Ying-ho (DAB)
- Kingsley Wong Kwok (FTU)
- Wong Kwok-keung Lee
- Wong Man-li
- Wong Ming-yeung (DAB)
- Nancy Wong (DAB)
- Wong Ngai-fai
- Wong Ting-chung (DAB)
- Wong Lik-ping
- Wong Ling-ling Lee
- Wong Wa-hong Lee
- Wong Wai-ching Lee
- William Wong Kam-fai Lee
- Wong Yeuk-hung
- Anthony Wu Ting-yuk Lee
- Wu King-cheong Lee
- Wut Yan
- Xu Mingjin
- Andrew Yao Cho-fai
- Yao Jue Lee
- Yang Siu-shun Lee
- Yeung Chi-hung
- Yeung Chun-fan
- Yeung Kwok-keung
- Yim Fung Lee
- Yiu Chi-shing Lee
- Yip Kin-ming
- Judith Yu
- Yu Kwok-chun (DAB) Lee
- Samuel Yung Wing-ki Lee
- Zeng Yuqun
- Zhang Li
- Zhang Yichen
- Zhou Chunling (DAB)

=== Representatives of Hong Kong Members of Relevant National Organisations ===
- Chan Chi-wai Lee
- Chan Chun-keung
- Cora Chan Wan Lee
- Chan Hok-fung (DAB; LegCo)
- Ian Chan Yau-nam Lee
- Chan Kwan
- Chan Wing-yan (FTU/DAB; LegCo)
- Chen Jianwen Lee
- Chen Xiaofeng Lee
- Cheng Cheung-ling Lee
- Carol Cheung Nga-lai
- Cheung Cho-gau Lee
- Fiona Cheung Sum-yu
- Chim Shing
- Ching Yin
- Chiu Ching Lee
- Stanley Choi Tak-shing Lee
- Choi Zheng-zhen
- Lily Chow
- Chow Pak-chin Lee
- Eva Choy Chi-ting Lee
- Albert Chuang Ka-pun
- Christopher Chuang Tze-cheung
- William Guilherme Doo Junior Lee
- Andrew Fan Chun-wah Lee
- Jiang Yan
- Ho Kwan-chau (DAB)
- Ho Man-kay
- Pansy Catilina Ho Chiu-king Lee
- Hui Kee-fung
- Ip Cheung-ching Lee
- Kai Yim-lee
- Carmen Kan Wai-mun (LegCo)
- Ko Chi-sum
- Peter Douglas Koon Ho-ming (LegCo)
- Stella Kun Lai-kuen Lee
- Bankee Kwan Pak-hoo Lee
- Kwok Fu-yung (DAB) Lee
- Simon Kwok Siu-ming Lee
- Lai Chun-lam
- Lam Ho-yi (BPA) Lee
- Lawrence Lam Chi-bun Lee
- Nixie Lam Lam (DAB; LegCo)
- Lam San-keung (LegCo)
- Lam Shu-chit Lee
- Jessica Lau Oi-lai
- Lau Kan-sum Lee
- Pierre Lau Chi-yan
- Clarence Leung Wang-ching (BPA) Lee
- Frankie Keith Leung Yat-fai
- Kenneth Leung Yuk-wai (LegCo)
- Li Sze-lim Lee
- Li Wai-keung Lee
- Lin Chau-kit
- Clarence Ling Chun-kit Lee
- Liu Yang
- Liu Yi-man Lee
- Liu Yu-hin Lee
- Lo Man-tuen (DAB) Lee
- Vicent Lo Wan-sing Lee
- Lu Hai
- Lincoln Lu Lee
- Luo Yong
- Ma Chun-ling
- Ma Jun
- Lawrence Ma Chung-lai
- Warren Mok Wah-yeun
- Angus Ng Hok-ming Lee
- Ng Chi-pan
- Ng Fai-tai Lee
- Ng Wah-kong
- Bobby Pau Hung-fan
- Jan Noel Shih (DAB)
- Shum Ka-sang Lee
- So Ching-tung Lee
- Sharon Tam Suet-yan
- Philip Pao Sohmen
- Tan Chong-chong
- Tang Wai-nin
- Stephen Ting Leung-huel
- Tong Zi-yan Lee
- Eric Tsang Chi-wai Lee
- Eric S Y Tse
- Tse Hiu-hung
- Tsoi Kin-sze
- Josephine Tsui Mei-wan Lee
- Tsui San-ying Lee
- Wong Kam-fai
- Wong King Lee
- Wong Kyin-pyu Lee
- Wong Siu-wah Lee
- Wong Tsz-man
- Wong Tsz-yuen
- Wong Wai-shan
- Wong Yeuk-man
- Wong Yiu-ying Lee
- Wu Chi-hei Lee
- Xuan Hongyan Lee
- Yam Tat-wing Lee
- Yiu Pang-fai (BPA) Lee
- Angelina Yuen Tsang Woon-ki Lee
- Alexander Yeung Ching-loong
- Yeung Chuen-sing Lee
- Yeung Ngai
- Yeung Yuk-sing
- Yiu Hang
- Zhao Lei Lee
- Zhang Liping Lee
- Zhuang Zhe-min

== See also ==
- List of members of the Election Committee of Hong Kong, 2017–21
