= Halina Poon =

Hong Kong educational worker

Halina Poon MH
- 潘淑嫻
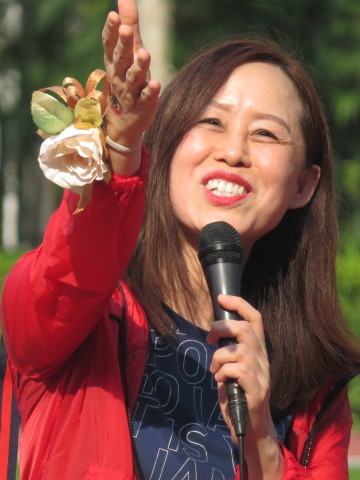
- Poon in 2018
- Education: Chinese University of Hong Kong (EdD, MA); University of Hong Kong (BA)
- Occupation: School principal

Halina Poon Suk-han MH (Chinese: 潘淑嫻) is a Hong Kong educational worker, currently serving as a member of the Election Committee, which is responsible for electing the Chief Executive.

== Education career ==
Poon is the founding principal of Christian and Missionary Alliance Sun Kei Secondary School. She was promoted to the chairlady of the Hong Kong Subsidized Secondary Schools Council from vice-chair in 2016, and stepped down in 2020.

Poon is also the member of the Council of the City University of Hong Kong. She had previously served as the courtier of the University of Hong Kong until 2020, and sat in a number of commissions of the Hong Kong Government as members. Poon was awarded the Medal of Honour by HKSAR Government in 2007 in recognition of her enthusiastic participation in educational and social affairs.

In February 2022, it is announced that Poon will become the principal of Guangzhou Nansha Minxin School for Hong Kong Children starting from September 2022. The primary-and-secondary school is founded by Leung Chun-ying, Hong Kong's former Chief Executive and vice-chairman of Chinese People's Political Consultative Conference.

== Political stance ==
Poon was regarded as pro-Beijing after joining the newly formed establishment-leaning teacher's group Education Professional Alliance in 2021. The Election Committee is also described as skewing the pro-Beijing camp. Poon ran in the 2021 Election Committee Subsector elections as a candidate from the Alliance, and was elected with the highest vote amongst other candidates in the Education subsector. She subsequently became an electorate for electing the Hong Kong deputies to the National People's Congress of China.

During her tenure as Subsidized Secondary Schools Council chair, large-scale protests erupted in the city. Poon was criticised for not signing a petition for an independent commission of inquiry. She later supported an independent commission of inquiry but on the arrest of teenagers. In the speech, she called on the Hong Kong authorities to rescue the institutions and livelihood, and hoped the Chinese Government not to give up on Hong Kong. She also claimed the fear of China for suppressing freedom of speech stems from bandwagon effect. She had contacted the police after "Glory to Hong Kong", the iconic song during protests, was heard from near the school she led.
