= Christian and Missionary Alliance Sun Kei Secondary School =

School in Hong Kong

Christian & Missionary Alliance Sun Kei Secondary School
- 基督教宣道會宣基中學
- No. 6 Tang Chun Street; Tseung Kwan O, Sai Kung District, New Territories; Hong Kong

Information
- Type: Allowance English middle school
- Motto: You must concentrate on the Lord, and you must not rely on your own wisdom, and you must be sure in all your actions, and you will guide your way. (Proverbs 3: 5-6)
- Established: 1999; 27 years ago
- Principal: Halina Poon
- Affiliation: Kowloon Tong Church of the Chinese Christian and Missionary Alliance
- Website: www.skss.edu.hk

Christian and Missionary Alliance Sun Kei Secondary School (Chinese: 基督教宣道會宣基中學) is an Evangelical Christian Secondary School which is located in 6 Tong Chun Street, Tseung Kwan O, Hong Kong. It is affiliated with the Kowloon Tong Church of the Chinese Christian and Missionary Alliance.

== History ==
It was established in 1999 by Kowloon Tong Church of the Chinese Christian and Missionary Alliance (KTAC).

The entire school has 27 classes, there are around 1000 students, and the principal is Dr. Poon Suk-han, Halina, MH.

== Spiritual Growth ==
Starting from September 1999, Sun Kei Secondary School always strives for nurturing spiritual growth of students and staffs. "Trust in the Lord with all your heart and lean not on your own understanding;in all your ways submit to him, and he will make your paths straight (Proverbs 3:5-6)" is chosen to be their school motto.

Moreover, Sun Kei will hold gospel week, sermon assembly once a year to force and encourage students become an Evangelical Christian.

== Transportation ==
MTR: Tseung Kwan O station Exit A1
