= 2022 National People's Congress election in Hong Kong =

- 15 December 2022

36 Hong Kong deputies to National People's Congress
- Registered: 1,420
- Turnout: 89.65%
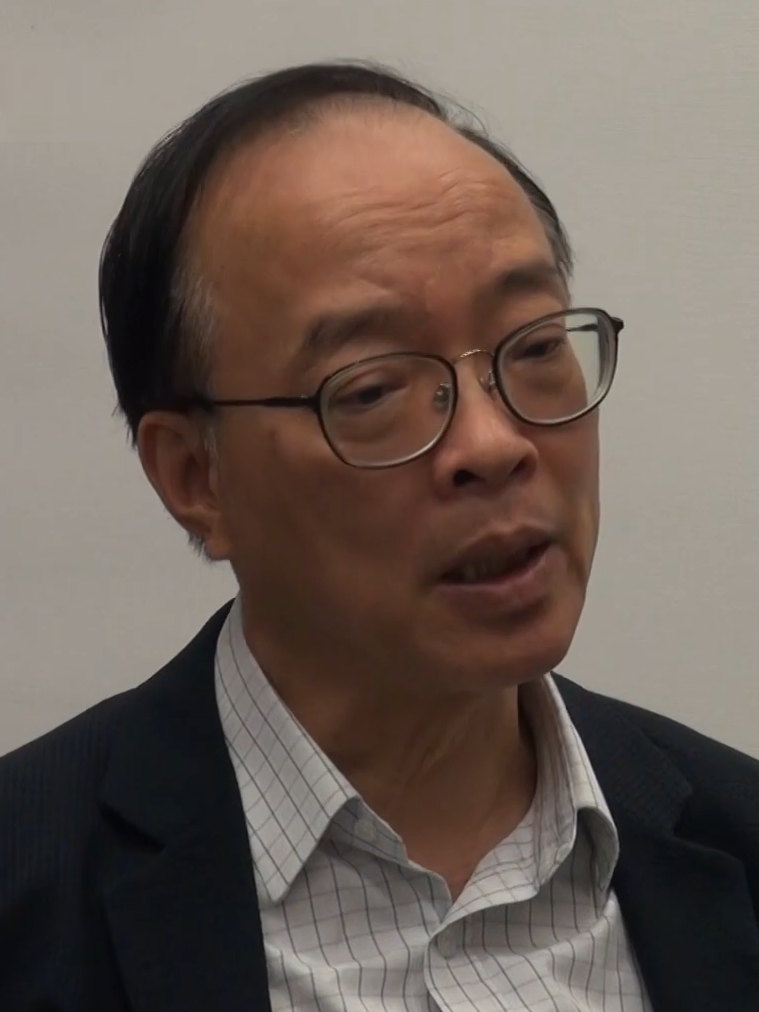
	Majority party
Leader	Ma Fung-kwok
Party	Pro-Beijing independent
Seats won	36
Delegation Convenor before election
Ma Fung-kwok
Independent
Elected Delegation Convenor
Ma Fung-kwok
Independent

The election for the Hong Kong deputies to the 14th National People's Congress (NPC) was held on 15 December 2022. 36 Hong Kong deputies were elected by an electoral college composed of 1,420 members.

== Electoral method ==
Article 21 of the Hong Kong Basic Law stipulates:

Chinese citizens who are residents of the Hong Kong Special Administrative Region shall be entitled to participate in the management of state affairs according to law. In accordance with the assigned number of seats and the selection method specified by the National People's Congress, the Chinese citizens among the residents of the Hong Kong Special Administrative Region shall locally elect deputies of the Region to the National People's Congress to participate in the work of the highest organ of state power.

The Standing Committee of the National People's Congress (Standing Committee of NPC) decided in March 2022 that the electoral college is to compose of the Chinese nationals of the Election Committee (which elects the Chief Executive of Hong Kong). The number of electorates was therefore at 1,420, down from 1,423 announced in September 2022 due to death and various issues.

This election adopted block voting system. Each electorate shall vote for 36 candidates, i.e. the number of open seats.

== Pre-election events ==
Tam Yiu-chung, Hong Kong's sole delegate to the Standing Committee of NPC, has announced his decision to step down and will not stand in the NPC's election because of his age. At least three more incumbents also decided not to seek re-election, including Lo Sui-on, Wong Yuk-shan, and Martin Liao.

Media also reported Carrie Lam, the former Chief Executive, may be vying for an NPC seat and tipped to succeed Tam.

During the first briefing about the election, Yang Zhenwu, secretary general of the Standing Committee of NPC, said the elected deputies will play a bigger role in the governance of China, and warned against any attempts to infiltrate or sabotage Chinese authorities through the election. The briefing also approved a list of 19 presidium members, but did not include Carrie Lam nor Tung Chee-hwa.

Members of presidium are as follows:

- John Lee, Chief Executive of Hong Kong [chairman of presidium]
- Leung Chun-ying, former Chief Executive of Hong Kong
- Regina Ip, convenor of Executive Council
- Tam Yiu-chung, delegate to Standing Committee of NPC
- Maria Tam, former convenor of NPC Hong Kong delegation [spokesman of presidium]
- Martin Liao, member of Legislative Council and Executive Council, convenor of pro-Beijing camp
- Kenneth Lau, member of Legislative Council and Executive Council
- Chan Kin-por, member of Legislative Council and Executive Council
- Arthur Li, member of Executive Council
- Ko Wing-man, member of Executive Council
- Margaret Chan, former Director-General of World Health Organization
- Lo Sui-on
- Lee Chack-fan
- Ng Leung-ho
- Yu Kwok-chun
- Peter Lam
- Lam Shuk-yee
- Wong Yuk-shan
- Jonathan Choi Koon-shum

On 8 December, John Lee, chairman of presidium, confirmed 42 hopefuls, out of 47 that obtained an application form, had secured enough nomination and became candidates of the election.

== BNO controversies ==
A total of 21 delegates did not seek reelection, including some of the prominent businessman. Financial Times later reported in March 2023 that Chinese officials told politicians and tycoons wishing to run in this election to renounce passports or travel documents from countries including the UK, with a message that "either you give it up or you don’t run." While China had previously said that British National (Overseas) passport holders were eligible for the election, at least one NPC delegate intending to seek another term was reportedly denied a seat because of this, which was confirmed by local media HK01. The British report cited the threat of "foreign forces" and "questions of loyalty" as the rationale behind.

== Election result ==
The voting took place at 10 am local time on 15 December and lasted for an hour. 1,273 electors cast their ballots, meaning more than 150 were absent, including Ko Wing-man and Martin Liao of the presidium. Ballot from 6 voters were rejected.

Neuroscientist Nancy Ip, President of the Hong Kong University of Science and Technology, secured the most votes. All 15 incumbents retained their seats, including Nancy Ip, Cally Kwong, Ma Fung-kwok, Herman Hu, Tim Lui, Li Yinquan, Dennis Lam, Bunny Chan, Nicholas Chan, Chan Yung, Ng Chau-pei, Maggie Chan, Henry Cai, Andrew Yao, Tommy Li.

Amongst the 21 new members are youth group representatives, ex-Transport Secretary Frank Chan, and former Government Chief Information Officer Allen Yeung. Seven Legislative Council members were elected for the first time, namely Starry Lee, Priscilla Leung, Chan Chun-ying, Kennedy Wong, Rock Chen, Kenneth Fok, and Jimmy Ng, therefore increasing the total of MPs in the delegation to 12. Six members of the Chinese People's Political Consultative Conference successfully earned a seat in the NPC.

Another six candidates lost, including Tse Oi-hung, vice-president of the Federation of Trade Unions, and Andrew Fan, son of former NPC Standing Committee member Rita Fan. Five of them are listed as supplementary members.

The list of elected delegates was submitted to the NPC's Candidate Eligibility Review Committee for review, and the results will be announced after their candidacies have been approved.

=== Elected members (36) ===
- Ginny Man Wing-yee
- Chu Lap-wai
- Nancy Chu Ip Yuk-yu
- Jimmy Ng Wing-ka
- Stanley Ng Chau-pei
- Li Yinquan
- Lee Shing-put
- Starry Lee Wai-king
- Tommy Li Ying-sang
- Wilson Shum Ho-kit
- Hendrick Sin
- Gordon Lam Chi-wing
- Dennis Lam Shun-chiu
- Andrew Yao Cho-fai
- Herman Hu Shao-ming
- Ling Yu-shih
- Kelvin Sun Wei-yung
- Eileen Tsui Li
- Ma Fung-kwok
- Priscilla Leung Mei-fun
- Frank Chan Fan
- Brave Chan Yung
- Rock Chen Chung-nin
- Ronick Chan Chun-ying
- Bunny Chan Chung-bun
- Maggie Chan Man-ki
- Nicholas Chan Hiu-fung
- Wong Ping-fan
- Kennedy Wong Ying-ho
- Wong Kam-leung
- Allen Yeung Tak-bun
- Tim Lui Tim-leung
- George Lau Ka-keung
- Henry Cai Yi
- Kenneth Fok Kai-kong
- Cally Kwong Mei-wan

=== Supplementary members (5) ===
- William Shum Wai-lam
- Sammy Lam Tin-hang
- Andrew Fan Chun-wah
- Daniel Chan Ching-yan
- Tse Oi-hung

=== Defeated candidate (1) ===
Edwin Cheng Kwok-kit won less than one-third of votes cast and became the only candidate not elected nor listed as supplementary member.

=== Detailed result ===
2022 National People's Congress election in Hong Kong
Party	Candidate	Votes	%	±%
Independent	Nancy Chu Ip Yuk-yu	1,254	98.97	+14.94
Independent	Kenneth Fok Kai-kong	1,248	98.50	
Independent (DAB)	Rock Chen Chung-nin	1,246	98.34	
Independent (DAB)	Starry Lee Wai-king	1,243	98.11	
Independent (DAB)	Brave Chan Yung	1,238	97.71	+3.53
Independent	Ronick Chan Chun-ying	1,237	97.63	
Independent	Andrew Yao Cho-fai	1,226	96.76	+3.09
Independent	Henry Cai Yi	1,217	96.05	+8.03
Independent (New Forum)	Ma Fung-kwok	1,216	95.97	+1.1
Independent	Maggie Chan Man-ki	1,213	95.74	+14.68
Independent (FTU)	Stanley Ng Chau-pei	1,212	95.66	+10.55
Independent	Frank Chan Fan	1,206	95.19	
Independent (Liberal)	Nicholas Chan Hiu-fung	1,204	95.03	+27.37
Independent	Li Yinquan	1,204	95.03	–0.01
Independent	George Lau Ka-keung	1,195	94.32	
Independent	Bunny Chan Chung-bun	1,193	94.16	+6.31
Independent (BPA)	Priscilla Leung Mei-fun	1,190	93.92	
Independent	Ling Yu-shih	1,190	93.92	
Independent	Lee Shing-put	1,183	93.37	
Independent (DAB)	Kennedy Wong Ying-ho	1,178	92.98	
Independent (BPA)	Jimmy Ng Wing-ka	1,176	92.82	
Independent	Ginny Man Wing-yee	1,174	92.66	
Independent	Cally Kwong Mei-wan	1,168	92.19	+4.00
Independent	Eileen Tsui Li	1,167	92.11	
Independent	Dennis Lam Shun-chiu	1,167	92.11	+5.40
Independent (FEW)	Wong Kam-leung	1,155	91.16	
Independent	Allen Yeung Tak-bun	1,155	91.16	
Independent	Herman Hu Shao-ming	1,132	89.34	+0.98
Independent	Tim Lui Tim-leung	1,117	88.16	+1.51
Independent	Hendrick Sin	1,091	86.11	
Independent	Gordon Lam Chi-wing	1,063	83.90	
Independent	Kelvin Sun Wei-yung	1,014	80.03	
Independent (DAB)	Chu Lap-wai	995	78.53	
Independent (Liberal)	Tommy Li Ying-sang	993	78.37	–2.69
Independent	Wilson Shum Ho-kit	941	74.27	
Independent (DAB)	Wong Ping-fan	935	73.80	
Independent (FTU)	Tse Oi-hung	889	70.17	
Independent	Andrew Fan Chun-wah	799	63.06	
Independent	Daniel Chan Ching-yan	663	52.33	
Independent	Sammy Lam Tin-hang	662	52.25	
Independent	William Shum Wai-lam	661	52.17	
Independent	Edwin Cheng Kwok-kit	202	15.94	
Total valid votes		1,267	99.53	+1.92
Rejected ballots		6	0.47	–1.92
Turnout		1,273	89.65	–0.65
Registered electors		1,420		–28.61

=== Result by party ===
Hong Kong local parties are not counted as national political parties and thus the below elected deputies will not carry their membership in the National People's Congress.

Party	Seats	±
DAB	6	▲1
BPA	2	▲2
Liberal	2	▲2
FTU	1	▼1
New Forum	1	Steady
FEW	1	▲1
Independent	23	▼4
Total	36	
