= 2022 Hong Kong Chief Executive election =

Election in Hong Kong

- 8 May 2022

All 1,461 votes of the Election Committee 751 votes needed to win
- Turnout: 97.74%
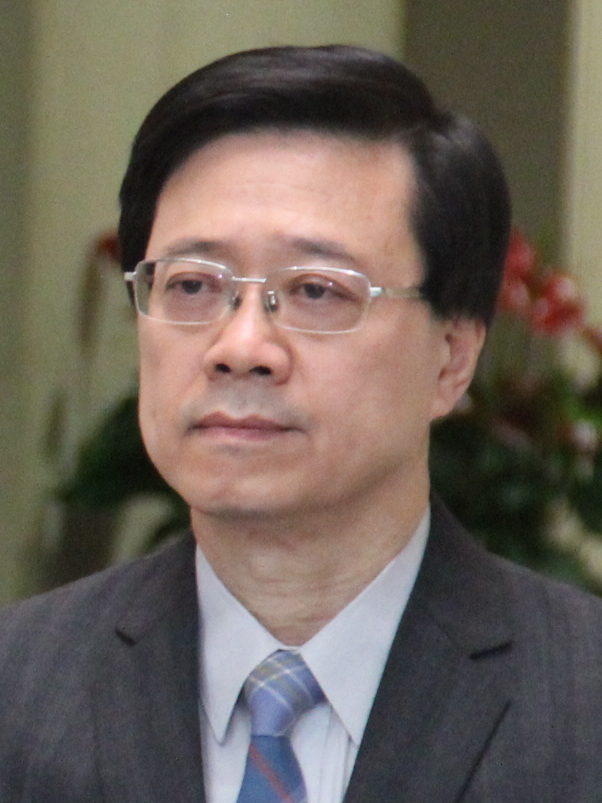
Nominee	John Lee Ka-chiu
Party	Nonpartisan
Alliance	Pro-Beijing camp
Electoral vote	1,416
Percentage	99.44%
Chief Executive before election
Carrie Lam
Nonpartisan
Elected Chief Executive
John Lee
Nonpartisan

The 2022 Hong Kong Chief Executive election was held on 8 May 2022 for the 6th term of the Chief Executive (CE), the highest office of the Hong Kong Special Administrative Region (HKSAR). Incumbent Carrie Lam, who was elected in 2017, declined to seek a second term for family reasons and finished her term on 30 June 2022. Former Chief Secretary John Lee Ka-chiu was the sole candidate approved by the central government of China in the election and the only candidate to be nominated. He received 1,416 electoral votes (99.44%) and assumed office on 1 July 2022.

== Background ==
=== Universal suffrage advocacy ===
The highest office of Hong Kong government, the Chief Executive, is selected by an Election Committee (EC) dominated by pro-Beijing politicians and tycoons. Since the terms of Article 45 of the Basic Law of Hong Kong requiring "selection of the Chief Executive by universal suffrage upon nomination by a broadly representative nominating committee in accordance with democratic procedures" have not been implemented, the progress to universal suffrage has been the dominant issue in Hong Kong politics since the transfer of sovereignty in 1997.

=== Change of political landscape ===
Carrie Lam, then Chief Secretary, assumed office as Chief Executive in 2017. Her tenure was marred by controversies and unpopular policies, including the scandals of her cabinet ministers. In 2019, the government push for amending the extradition bill spurred massive anti-government protests calling for the withdrawal of the bill, which later evolved into blanket pro-democracy protests. The Government partially conceded and shelved the bill after violent clashes, which failed to end the protests.

A year later, the Hong Kong National Security Law was passed by China's central government to quell protests, followed by arrests of leading pro-democracy activists (also resulting in the dissolution of most pro-democracy political parties and organisations) and changing the electoral system. The changes allowed only government-defined "patriots" to rule the city, and allocated 40 legislative seats to the Election Committee (which also elects the Chief Executive), dominated by pro-Beijing members following the 2021 Hong Kong Election Committee Subsector elections. The number of directly elected seats was reduced from 35 to 20. A new vetting mechanism would also be created to vet every candidate running for the Chief Executive, the Legislative Council and the Election Committee based on the approval of the Hong Kong Committee for Safeguarding National Security according to the review by the National Security Department of the Hong Kong Police Force (HKPF) whose decision would be final and could not be appealed. Local organisations seen as pro-Beijing would also be able to nominate candidates to the Election Committee. Ex-officio seats were also increased while directly elected seats were decreased. Before the changes, the pro-democracy camp had expected to win a majority in the legislative election. This was the first election after massive changes to the political landscape in Hong Kong.

== Pre-nomination events ==
This year's election was unusually quiet compared to the previous elections with no heavyweights declaring to enter the race before the nomination period started. The Chinese Government had reportedly asked Hong Kong authorities to put a hold on the election procedures in January 2022.

Amidst the fifth wave of the COVID-19 pandemic in Hong Kong and following order from Xi Jinping, General Secretary of the Chinese Communist Party, to prioritize control of the pandemic, the Hong Kong Government invoked the Emergency Regulations Ordinance on 18 February 2022 to postpone the Chief Executive election from 27 March 2022 to 8 May 2022, despite Chief Executive Carrie Lam saying there was no need for a postponement just a week prior. Rumors grew in late March that the election could be postponed for a year with the current government's tenure extended for a year by the Chinese Parliament.

== Nomination ==
The nomination period for the election began on 3 April and ran until 16 April. The deadline for submitting nominations was 14 April as the Easter general holidays were ahead. Candidates had to be nominated by not less than 188 members of the Election Committee, including at least 15 from each of the five sectors.

=== Lee as "leader-in-waiting" ===
On 4 April, Carrie Lam, eligible for re-election, announced that she would not seek a second term in office and would leave public service entirely, citing a desire to spend more time with her family. Lam said she had told the Central People's Government of her decision not to run for re-election in early 2021. Local reports then hinted John Lee Ka-chiu, the Chief Secretary at the time, could join the race and to become the sole candidate of the election, adopting the Macanese modal of election. Hong Kong Liaison Office, the representative of the Chinese central government in Hong Kong, reportedly told Election Committee members on 6 April that Lee would be the only candidate for the post with Beijing's "blessing".

On 6 April, John Lee Ka-chiu resigned as the Chief Secretary, and announced his intention to run in the upcoming chief executive election. Two days later, the resignation was approved by the State Council of China. Lee formally announced he would stand in the election later that day and held a news conference the following day.

On 13 April, Lee was nominated as the only candidate of the election, and the candidacy was confirmed by vetting authorities on 18 April. With a total of 786 nominations, Lee has already won the support of half of the Election Committee.

=== Reactions ===
Lee was expected to secure enough nominations, and win the election without uncertainty. The pro-Beijing camp generally supported Lee as the next Chief Executive, with a campaign office composed of 16 deputy directors from a variety of backgrounds and as political heavyweights, some of those rallied for Carrie Lam, the incumbent Chief Executive, CY Leung and Donald Tsang, the former Chief Executives. The four real estate developer giants also supported Lee.

The background of Lee, having served in the police for decades, raised concerns about his hardline attitude and inexperience. Lee was also criticised as being "surprisingly weak and unprepared" in a "carefully choreographed" press conference, without details on election manifesto. Lo Kin-hei, chairperson of Democratic Party, the largest pro-democracy party, now out of parliament, said anointing Lee implies the Chinese Government chooses to proceed with hardline policies.

Senior government loyalists also sought to play down criticism that the leadership race did not field any rivals to Lee. Maria Tam, former Convenor of National People's Congress Hong Kong delegation, said "having one person run for (chief executive) does not mean we have fewer choices".

== Procedures ==
Only the 1,461 members of the Election Committee can select the new Chief Executive. Candidates need to be nominated by at least 188 members of the Election Committee. Candidates winning more than 750 votes, half of the Election Committee, will be appointed.

== Candidates ==
=== Nominee ===
Candidate	Born	Party	Most recent position	Campaign	Nominations received
John Lee Ka-chiu 李家超	7 December 1957 (age 64)	Nonpartisan (Pro-Beijing)	Chief Secretary for Administration (2021–2022)	We and Us; A New Chapter Together Announced: 9 April 2022; Nominated: 13 April 2022	786 / 1,454 (54%)

=== Failed to be nominated ===
None of the following candidates were successfully nominated.

- Ahm Warm-sun
- Lai Hung-mui, security guard
- Checkley Sin Kwok-lam, pro-Beijing film producer, businessman, kung fu master, internet celebrity, withdrew on 14 April and supported John Lee Ka-chiu
- Siu Tak-keung, software engineer
- Titus Wu Sai-chuen, property investor, former member of pro-Beijing party DAB
- Wong Man-hong

=== Declined to run ===
The following either expressed their wish to run or were considered potential candidates but were not allowed by Beijing to run or did not enter the race:

- Paul Chan, incumbent Financial Secretary, hinted not to run after John Lee Ka-chiu resigned
- Margaret Chan, former director-general of the World Health Organization (WHO), nominated John Lee Ka-chiu
- Norman Chan, former chief executive of the Hong Kong Monetary Authority, joined John Lee Ka-chiu's campaign office
- Charles Ho, member of the National Committee of the Chinese People's Political Consultative Conference (CPPCC) and chairman of the Sing Tao News Corporation, nominated John Lee Ka-chiu
- Leung Chun-ying, vice-chairman of the National Committee of the Chinese People's Political Consultative Conference (CPPCC) and former Chief Executive, nominated John Lee Ka-chiu

The following persons explicitly declined to run:

- Charles Li, former chief executive of the Hong Kong Exchanges and Clearing
- Bernard Charnwut Chan, convenor of the non-official members of Executive Council
- Regina Ip, chairwoman of the New People's Party and member of the Executive and Legislative Councils
- Carrie Lam, incumbent Chief Executive
- Chris Tang, Secretary for Security
- Henry Tang, Standing Committee member of the CPPCC National Committee, former Chief Secretary for Administration and 2012 candidate
- Jasper Tsang, former President of the Legislative Council
- John Tsang, former Financial Secretary and 2017 candidate

== Campaign ==
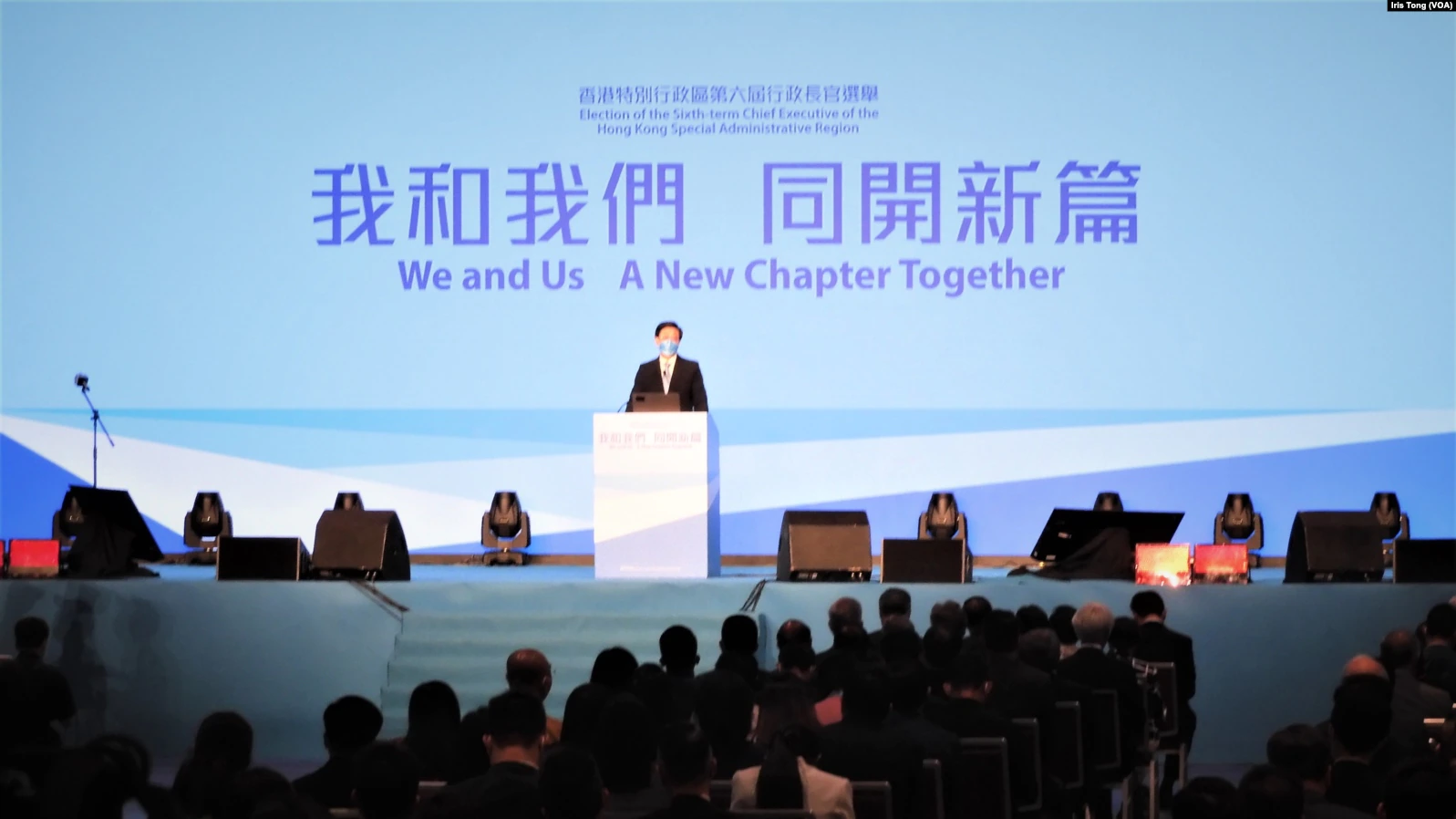
Election rally of Lee on 6 May

Lee unveiled his election manifesto on 29 April, vowed to strengthen governance, boost land and housing supply, improve Hong Kong's competitiveness and build a caring society if elected. Lee also announced legislating the city's own security law under Article 23 of the Basic Law. The manifesto was only announced nine days before election, making it the latest and also the shortest amongst all past candidates in the Chief Executive election.

The YouTube channel of Lee was disabled on 19 April in order for Google to comply with United States sanctions. Lee's campaign director, Tam Yiu-chung, said the move was illogical, while the Ministry of Foreign Affairs of China slammed Google's move and accused the United States of interfering in Hong Kong 's election. Lee's Facebook account was demonetized and prevented from using payments services.

Lee's only election rally was on 6 May, with only invited guests and the press in attendance. Some observers said his presentation lacked human touch. The slogan of the rally was also noticed by the public for the grammatical error, which includes the rarely used Chinese wording "我和我們" (lit. "I and We") and erroneous English translation "We and Us". Lee's campaign office later claimed the slogan hoped to show unity, and criticised those "only insisting on their ideas" are "disrespectful".

== Result ==
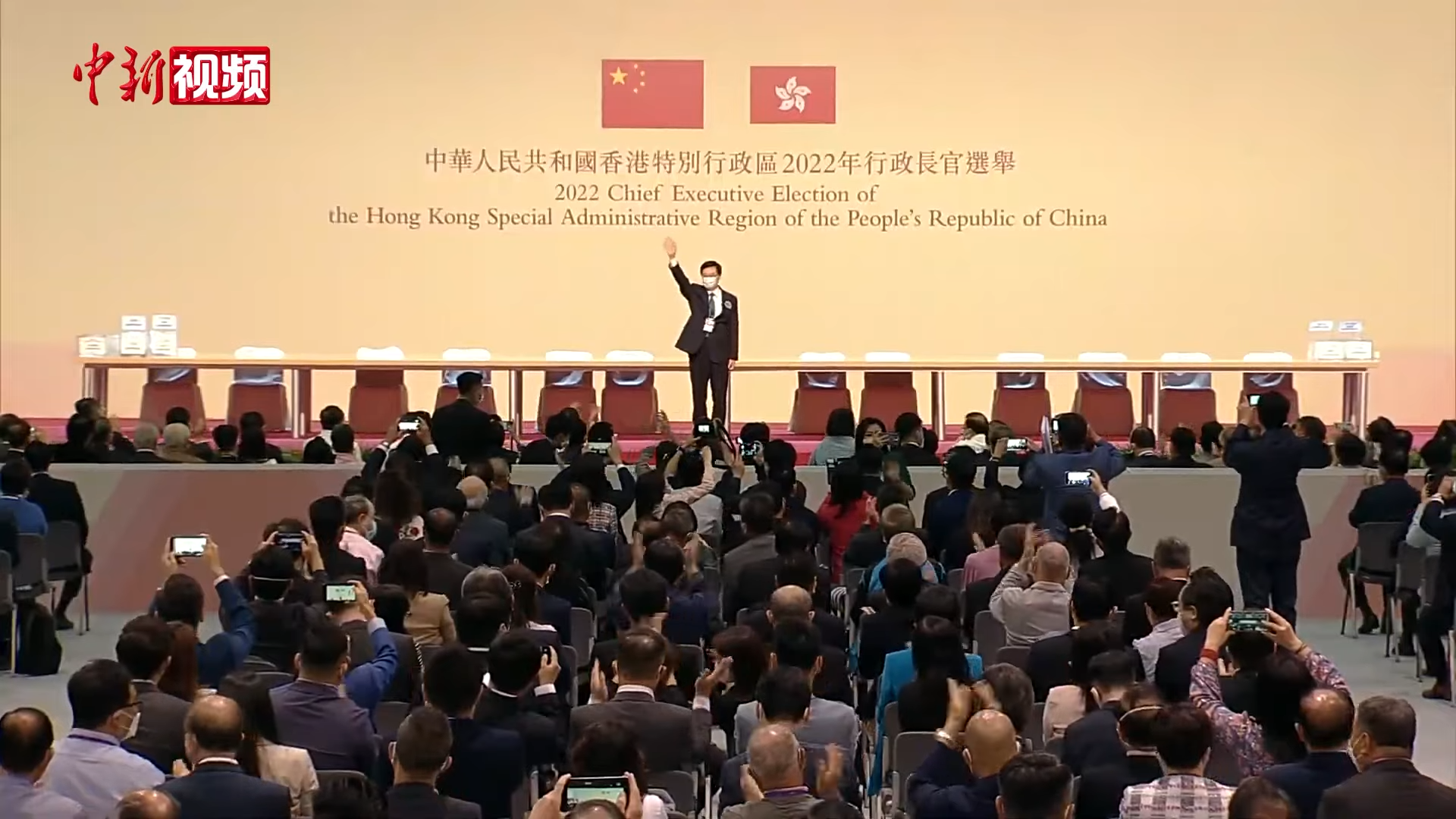
John Lee Ka-chiu was declared the winner at the HKCEC on 8 May 2022.

The 2022 election was the first sole-candidate election since the Chief Executive Election Ordinance was amended in 2006 to require a vote of confidence.

The election was held at the 1/F of Hong Kong Convention and Exhibition Centre (HKCEC) from 9 to 11:30 a.m. on 8 May 2022, and at Penny's Bay Quarantine Centre from 9 to 10:30 a.m, where 6 electors cast their votes. Vote counting on 3/F of HKCEC finished within 23 minutes, and the election result was announced at 12:28 p.m. John Lee Ka-chiu, the sole candidate, was declared the winner after receiving 1,416 support votes, or a record of 99.4%. Eight votes were against Lee, whilst four were blank votes and 33 did not cast their ballots.

Candidate	Party	Votes	%
John Lee Ka-chiu	Nonpartisan	1,416	99.44
Against		8	0.56
Total		1,424	100.00
Valid votes		1,424	99.72
Invalid/blank votes		4	0.28
Total votes		1,428	100.00
Registered voters/turnout		1,461	97.74

== Reactions ==
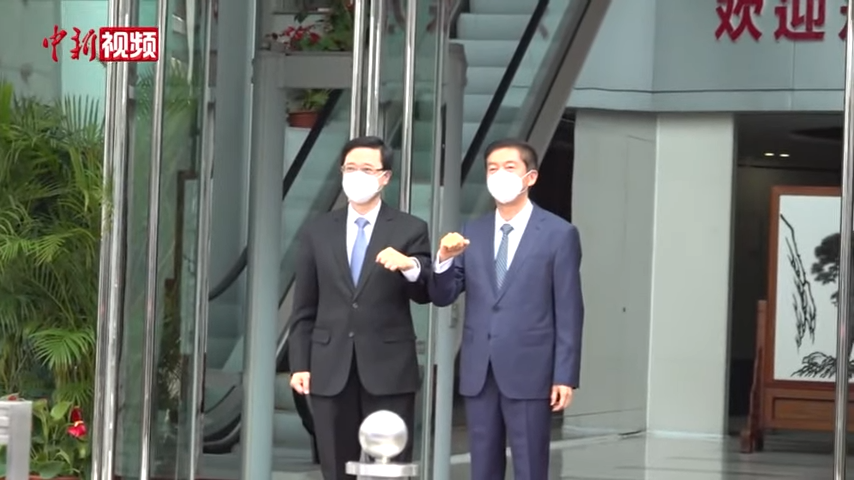
John Lee Ka-chiu and Luo Huining at the Hong Kong Liaison Office on 9 May 2022.

=== Local ===
Elites in the city and the Chinese Government congratulated the highly anticipated victory for Lee, including the China Liaison Office in Hong Kong, Chief Executive Carrie Lam, Hong Kong General Chamber of Commerce, and various pro-Beijing parties.

The selection did not garner much attention because it was not conducted by popular vote. However, Lee's victory speech was noticed by the public, as he mistakenly wished the mothers in Hong Kong a "Happy Christmas" on Mother's Day, and allegedly said "love Hong Kong this country" in Cantonese, which a pro-Beijing politician later clarified as "love Hong Kong this home" and slammed those with anti-government sentiments for spreading "misinformation".

League of Social Democrats (LSD), one of the only remaining pro-democracy groups, held a three-person protest before polls opened, chanting "power to the people, universal suffrage now". Vanessa Chan, chairwoman of the LSD, criticised John Lee Ka-chiu for shrinking civil liberties in his "new chapter". Stand with Hong Kong, an activist organisation based overseas, called the leadership race a "sham election", and urged "democratic countries across the world" not to recognise the race.

=== International ===
Taiwan's Mainland Affairs Council urged John Lee Ka-chiu to "listen and respond to the public's view, and respect Hong Kong people's right to pursue democracy, and stop hurting Hong Kong's freedom and human rights." The European Union (EU) put out a statement regretting the "violation of democratic principles and political pluralism" after the "sweeping changes" in the electoral system, adding that it saw the selection process as "yet another step in the dismantling of the 'one country, two systems' principle". The Group of Seven (G7) also released a statement, expressing grave concern over the selection as part of a continued assault on political pluralism and fundamental freedoms, and called on China to act in accordance with its legal obligations. China dismissed the statements by the EU and the G7 as "interfering" in China's internal affairs.

== See also ==
- Lee government
