= Ling Yu-shih =

Taiwan-born Hong Kong politician

- 凌友詩
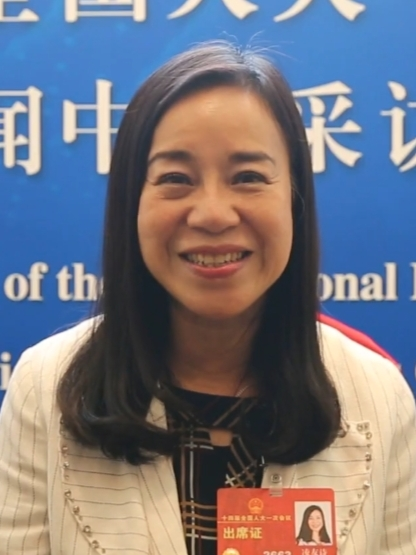

Deputy to National People's Congress
- Incumbent
- Assumed office 5 March 2023
- Constituency: Hong Kong

Personal details
- Born: 1962 (age 63–64) Kaohsiung, Taiwan
- Education: University of Hong Kong; Chinese University of Hong Kong

Grace Ling Yu-shih (Chinese: 凌友詩, born 1962) is a Taiwan-born Chinese politician from Hong Kong. She is a member of the National People's Congress of China and is known for her pro-China stance and advocacy for Chinese unification, particularly following her speech titled "Taiwanese Girl" (simplified Chinese: 台湾女孩; traditional Chinese: 台灣女孩).

== Early life ==
Ling's father, a former vice-commander of a warship from Panyu, Guangdong, retreated to Taiwan in 1949 following the defeat of the Nationalists in the Chinese Civil War. Ling was born in a military dependents' village in Kaohsiung, Taiwan. Her family relocated to Hong Kong when she was 17 years old.

She studied Chinese at the Chinese University of Hong Kong (CUHK), where she later obtained a Master's degree in Chinese and Politics. She then completed a Doctorate in Political Philosophy at the University of Hong Kong.

In 2005, Ling was appointed as a senior research administrator at the Central Policy Unit of the Hong Kong Government. She later became an honorary researcher at the Research Centre for Contemporary Chinese Culture at CUHK. A frequent contributor to the pro-Beijing newspaper Ta Kung Pao, Ling went on to serve as a member of the Fujian Provincial Committee of the Chinese People's Political Consultative Conference and as an executive of the All-China Women's Federation, participating in national-level organisations.

== Support for Taiwan unification ==
After being appointed as a Hong Kong delegate to the Chinese People's Political Consultative Conference (CPPCC) in 2018, Ling continued to express pro-China views. During a plenary session of the 13th CPPCC in March 2019, Ling—a national of the Republic of China (Taiwan)—publicly voiced support for the One China policy and stated that her birthplace should be unified with the People's Republic of China.

Today, I stand at the speaker's podium in the Great Hall of the People. I would like to say that there is only one China in the world, and the only legitimate representative government of China is the Government of the People's Republic of China. I am proud to participate in the country's legal system as a dignified Chinese person! … I believe that in the near future, the central government will be able to clarify the legal status of Taiwanese residents as 'Chinese citizens', just as mothers recognise their own children—so that they may abandon intolerance and be as honest as I am.

— Ling Yu-shih, CPPCC plenary session

In the speech, Ling described herself as "an ordinary Taiwanese girl and an outside visitor from Hong Kong". The address was met with 13 rounds of applause and received positive coverage in Chinese state media. In contrast, many Hong Kong and Taiwanese netizens criticised the speech online, describing it as overly theatrical and noting her deliberate use of a Beijing-accented Mandarin.

The Ministry of Interior of Taiwan subsequently fined Ling NT$500,000 (US$16,300) for violating the Act Governing Relations between the People of the Taiwan Area and the Mainland Area (commonly known as the Cross-Strait Act), citing her CPPCC membership and advocacy of unification. Ling refused to pay the fine, arguing that the act was "unconstitutional" and infringed upon human rights. The ministry also initiated proceedings to revoke her Taiwanese nationality if she was found to possess a hukou or passport issued by the People's Republic of China. In response, Ling stated that she holds only household registration in Taiwan and permanent residency in Hong Kong, and is "mentally prepared" for possible revocation, but expressed greater concern for other unification advocates facing similar pressure.

In 2021, Ling proposed the introduction of a reunification law that would penalise "Taiwan secessionist" and blacklist individuals obstructing unification efforts. The following year, she was selected as a Hong Kong deputy to the 14th National People's Congress (NPC). During the first session of the 14th NPC in March 2023, she proposed amendments to the Anti-Secession Law. Her recommendations included restricting electoral rights in Taiwan, appointing a "Governor of Taiwan Province", integrating the Republic of China Armed Forces into the People's Liberation Army, and repealing the Constitution of the Republic of China. Ling further suggested replacing the "one country, two systems" framework with a "one country, one system" model for Taiwan.

In response to her remarks, the Ministry of the Interior issued a second NT$500,000 fine. Ling stated she would only consider paying the fine if Taiwanese authorities formally accepted the One China principle and the 1992 Consensus. She also criticised what she described as "autocratic" measures deterring unofficial cross-strait exchanges.
