= 2021 Hong Kong Election Committee Subsector elections =

2021 Election Committee subsector elections
- 19 September 2021

967 (of the 1,500) seats in the Election Committee 751 seats needed for a majority
- Registered: 7,971 (Note: Of those 7,971 registered voters, 4,889 were obliged to vote as the remaining were voters of the uncontested seats.) ▼96.77%
- Turnout: 4,389 (89.77%) ▲43.24pp
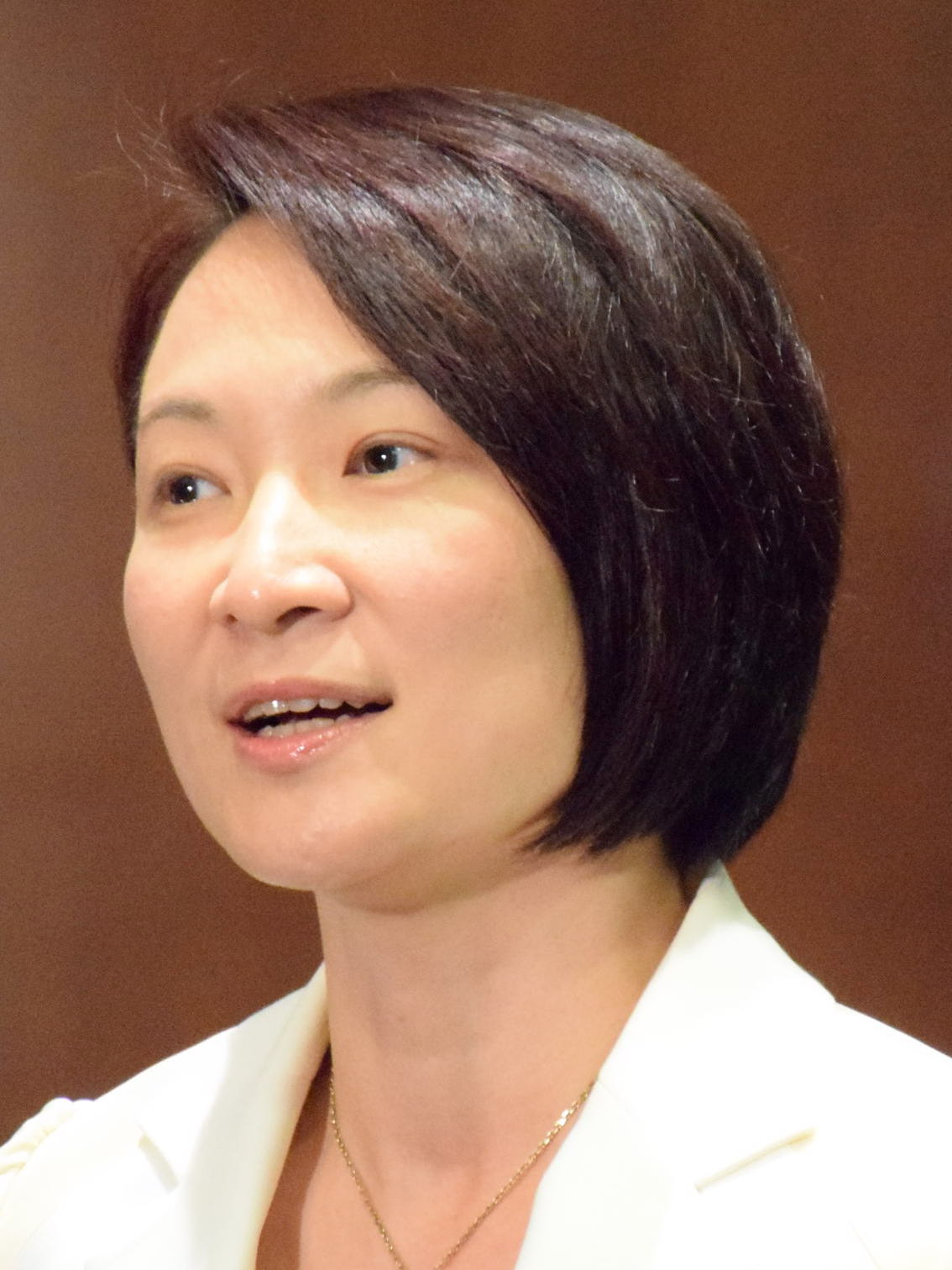

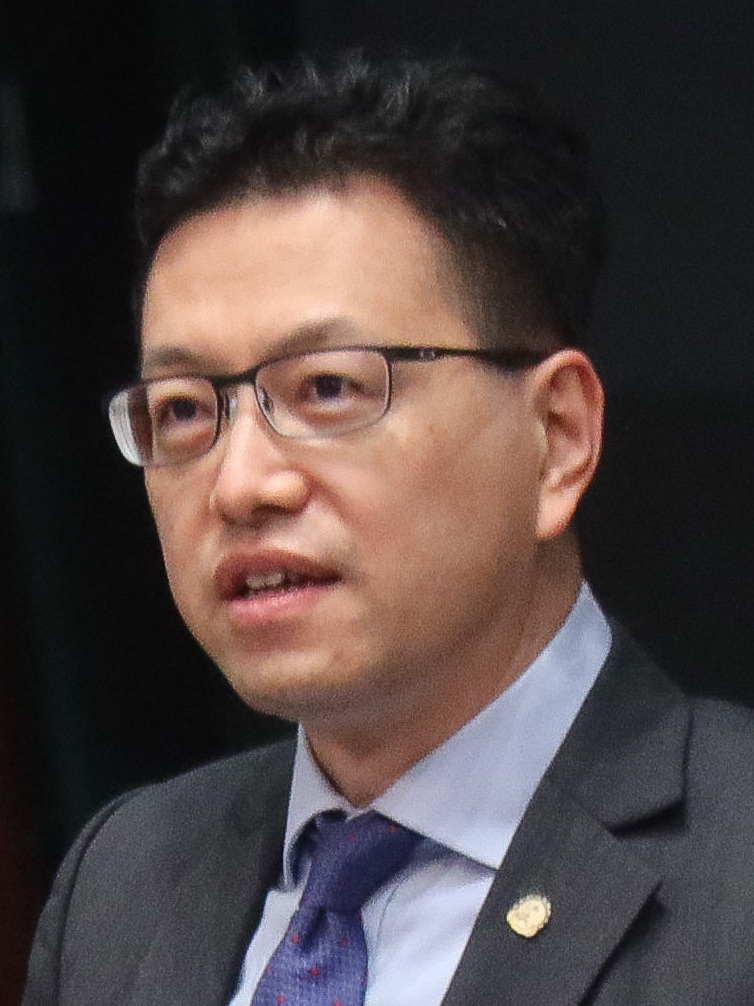

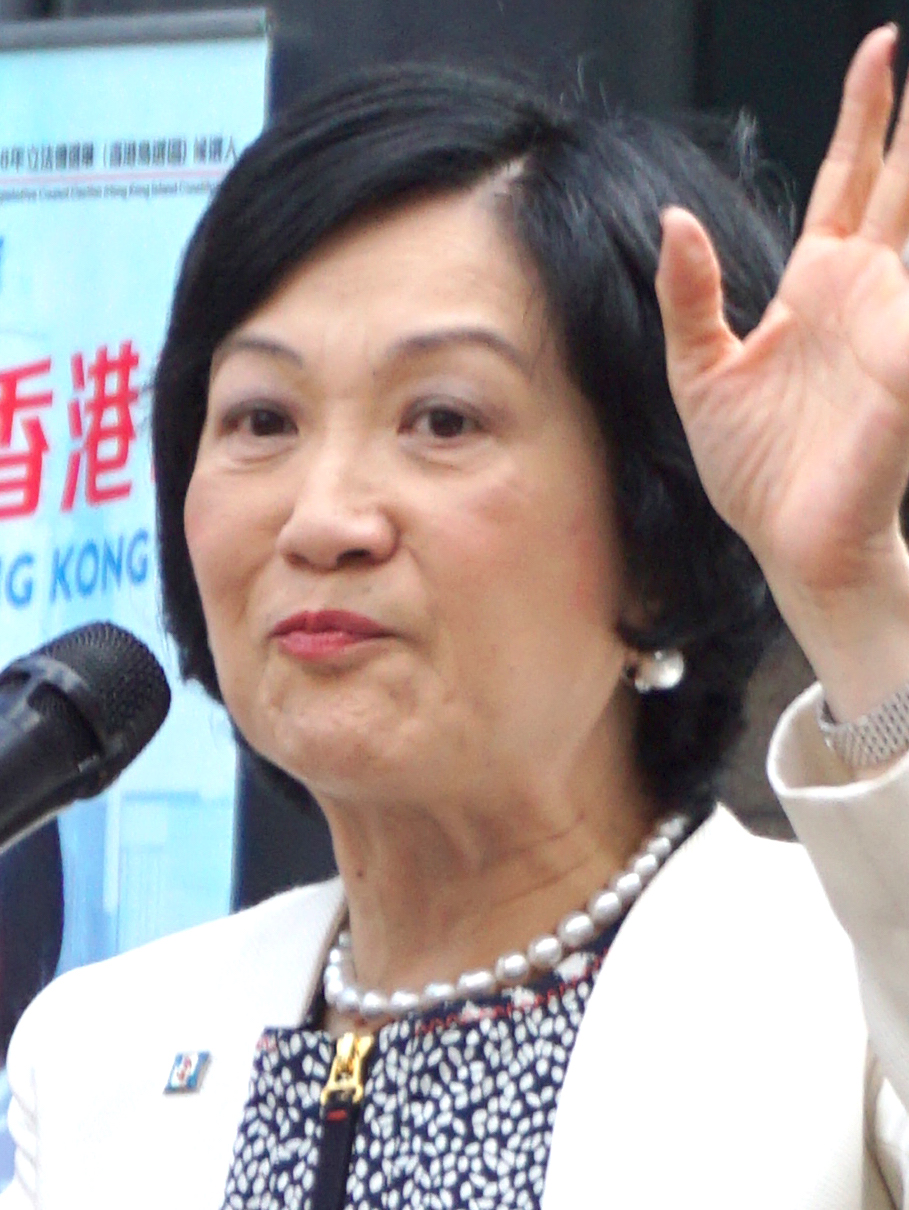

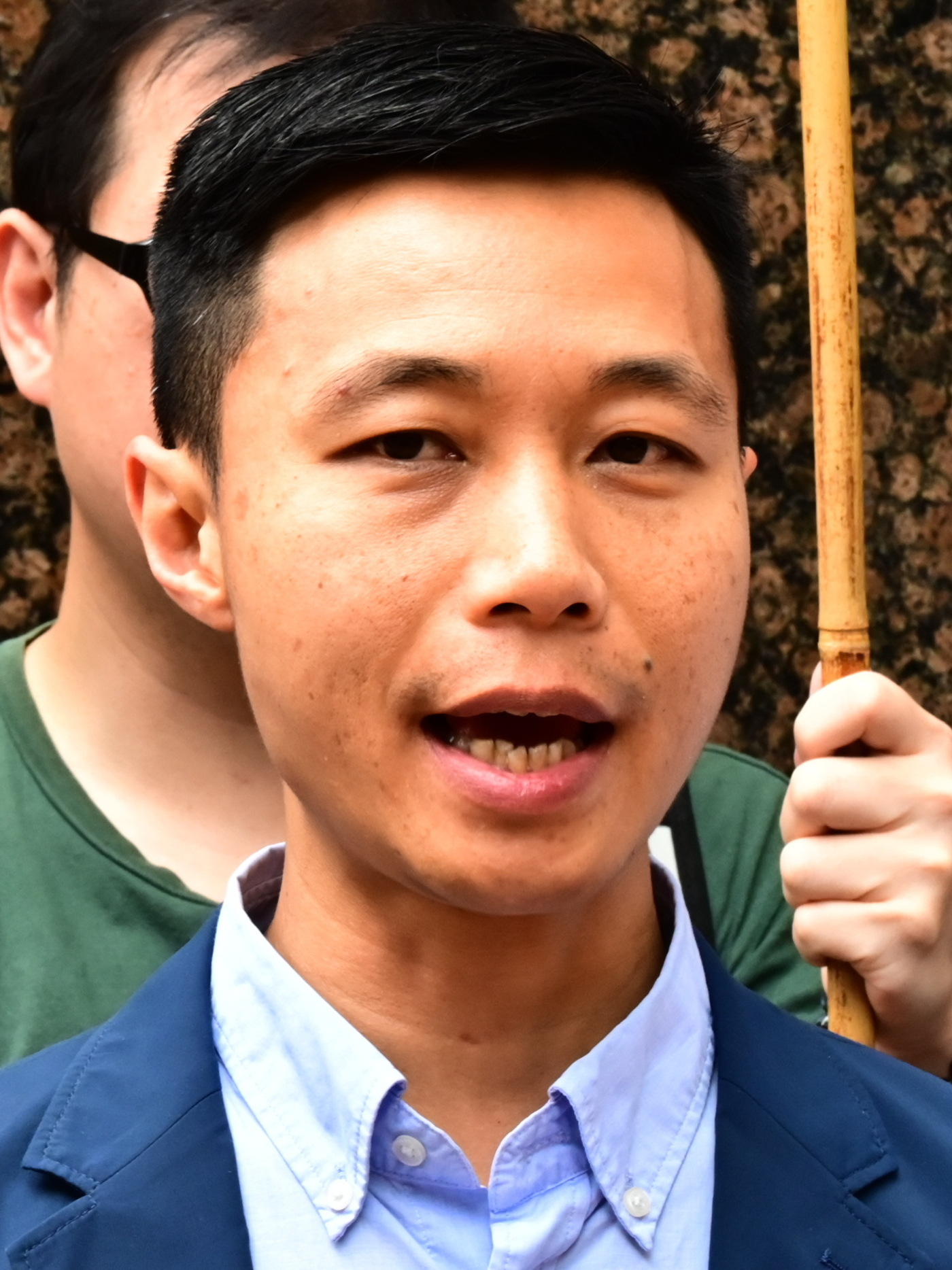

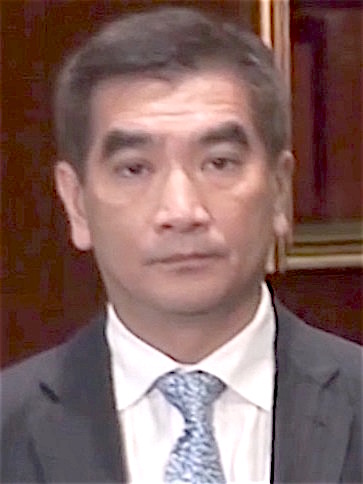

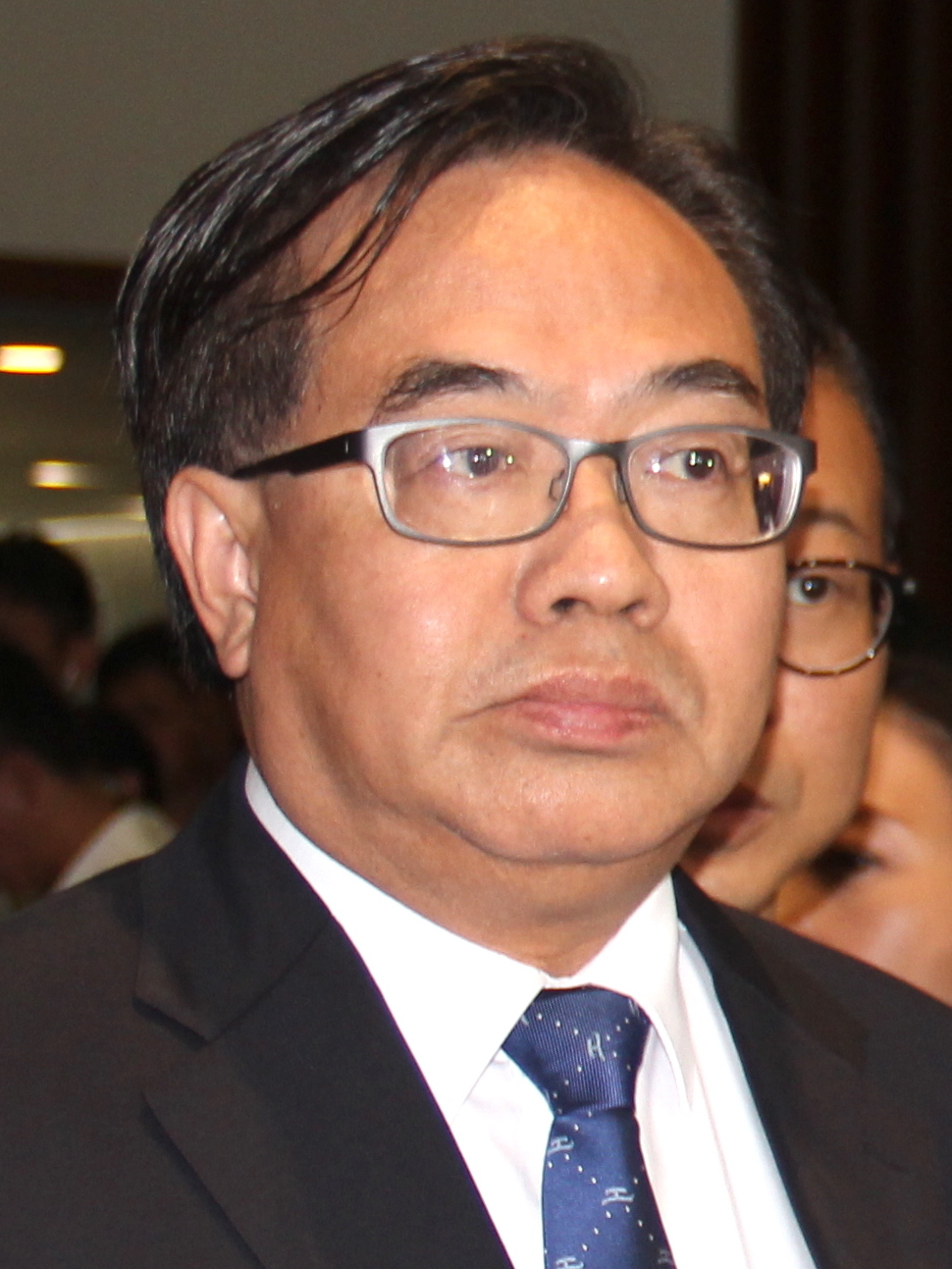
	First party	Second party	Third party
Leader	Starry Lee	Ng Chau-pei	Regina Ip
Party	DAB	FTU	NPP
Alliance	Pro-Beijing	Pro-Beijing	Pro-Beijing
Seats won	65	56	10
	Fourth party	Fifth party	Sixth party
Leader	Lam Chun-sing	Felix Chung	Lo Wai-kwok
Party	FLU	Liberal	BPA
Alliance	Pro-Beijing	Pro-Beijing	Pro-Beijing
Seats won	9	7	6

The 2021 Election Committee subsector elections were held on 19 September 2021 for elected seats of the 1,500 members of the Election Committee (EC) which is responsible for electing 40 of the 90 seats in the Legislative Council (LegCo) in the 2021 election and the Chief Executive of Hong Kong (CE) in the 2022 election.

Based on the new electoral framework imposed by the Beijing government, the composition of the Election Committee is drastically changed, seeing its size increasing from 1,200 to 1,500, with a sizeable number of new seats being nominated and elected by government-appointed and Beijing-controlled organisations, replacing a total number of 117 seats of District Council subsectors which would have been controlled by the pro-democracy camp due to the electoral landslide in the 2019 District Council election. It was widely seen as Beijing's latest move to further curb the influence of the pro-democrats who were able to win more than a quarter of the total seats in the last election in 2016 and its following electoral success in the wake of the widespread anti-government protests of 2019.

Under the new system, the registered voters for the Election Committee dropped by almost 97 per cent, sharply declining from 246,440 voters in 2016 to only 7,891 voters in 2021. Only 13 of the 36 electable subsectors had a contested race, equal to around a quarter of the Election Committee seats involving 412 candidates and about 4,800 eligible voters, while the majority of the seats were either ex officio, nominated by special interest groups or elected uncontestedly. With pro-democrats being purged before the election, the Election Committee was tightly controlled by the pro-Beijing camp with effectively no opposition presence.

== Background ==
=== 2016–2017 electoral cycle ===
Despite the unique design of the Election Committee (EC) being deeply in favour of the pro-Beijing and pro-business interests, the pro-democrats were able to pocketed more than one-eighth of seats to nominate Civic Party's Alan Leong and Democratic Party's Albert Ho into the Chief Executive race in 2007 and 2012 respectively.

In the 2016 Election Committee Subsector elections, the pro-democrats launched the "Democrats 300+" campaign, aiming at winning more than 300 seats in order to nominate an alternative candidate against incumbent Chief Executive Leung Chun-ying. As a result, the pro-democrats took a record quarter of the seat in the elections, with the help of the landslide victories in the Second Sector of professions, the traditional pro-democracy stronghold, despite Leung Chun-ying announced that he would not seek for a second term two days before the Election Committee elections. The pro-democrats supported former Financial Secretary John Tsang and former judge Woo Kwok-hing against Beijing-favoured Carrie Lam, former Chief Secretary for Administration, making the 2017 Chief Executive election fairly competitive.

=== 2021 NPC electoral reform ===
In the summer of 2019, the Carrie Lam administration pushed for the extradition bill triggered the unprecedented waves of anti-government protests in the latter half of the year. In the November District Council election, the pro-democrats won a historic electoral landslide by winning more than 80 per cent of the seats, seizing control of 17 of the 18 District Councils as a result. Due to the bloc voting system in the Election Committee, it would mean that the pro-democrats could take all of the 117 seats of the District Council seats in the upcoming Election Committee elections and increase their bargaining power in picking the next Chief Executive.

To thwart opposition momentum and neutralise the pro-democracy movement, the Carrie Lam administration unprecedentedly invoked the Emergency Regulations Ordinance to postpone the September 2020 Legislative Council election, citing the COVID-19 pandemic. In March 2021, the National People's Congress (NPC), China's national legislature, unveiled the plan to drastically rewrite the electoral system for the Chief Executive, the Election Committee and the Legislative Council, claiming the necessity to ensure "patriots governing in Hong Kong" as the basis of further curbing the pro-democracy influence in the coming elections.

== New electoral system ==
Allocation of seats and electoral methods of the Election Committee Subsectors
Sector	Subsector	Seats	Methods		Composition		Seat change	No. of registered voters		
Sector	Subsector	Seats	Methods		Ind.	Corp.	Seat change	Ind.	Corp.	Total
First Sector		300					0		1,646	1,646
I	Industrial (First)	17	Elect			✓	▼1		35	35
I	Industrial (Second)	17	Elect			✓	▼1		97	97
I	Textiles and Garment	17	Elect			✓	▼1		57	57
I	Commercial (First)	17	Elect			✓	▼1		22	22
I	Commercial (Second)	17	Elect			✓	▼1		71	71
I	Commercial (Third) (Note: Former Hong Kong Chinese Enterprises Association renamed.)	17	Elect			✓	▲1		93	93
I	Finance	17	Elect			✓	▼1		55	55
I	Financial Services	17	Elect			✓	▼1		195	195
I	Insurance	17	Elect			✓	▼1		88	88
I	Real Estate and Construction	17	Elect			✓	▼1		91	91
I	Transport	17	Elect			✓	▼1		199	199
I	Import and Export	17	Elect			✓	▼1		45	45
I	Tourism	17	Elect			✓	▼1		131	131
I	Hotel	16	Elect			✓	▼1		57	57
I	Catering	16	Elect			✓	▼1		135	135
I	Wholesale and Retail	17	Elect			✓	▼1		63	63
I	Employers' Federation of Hong Kong	15	Elect			✓	▼1		18	18
I	Small and Medium Enterprises	17	Elect			✓	New		194	194
Second Sector		300					0		2,488	2,488
II	Technology and Innovation (Note: Information Technology subsector replaced.)	30	Nominate (Note: Nominated from among Hong Kong academicians of the Chinese Academy of Sciences and the Chinese Academy of Engineering.)	15	✓		New		54	54
II	Technology and Innovation	30	Elect	15		✓ (Note: Individual voting replaced.)	▼15		54	54
II	Engineering	30	Ex-officio (Note: Responsible persons of statutory bodies, advisory bodies and relevant associations.)	15	✓		New		60	60
II	Engineering	30	Elect	15		✓	▼15		60	60
II	Architectural, Surveying, Planning and Landscape	30	Ex-officio	15	✓		New		55	55
II	Architectural, Surveying, Planning and Landscape	30	Elect	15		✓	▼15		55	55
II	Accountancy	30	Nominate (Note: Nominated from among Hong Kong Accounting Advisors appointed by the Ministry of Finance.)	15	✓		New		39	39
II	Accountancy	30	Elect	15		✓	▼15		39	39
II	Legal	30	Ex-offcio (Note: Hong Kong members of the Committee for the Basic Law of the HKSAR under the NPC Standing Committee.)	6	✓		New		30	30
II	Legal	30	Nominate (Note: Nominated from among Hong Kong members of the Council of the China Law Society.)	9	✓		New		30	30
II	Legal	30	Elect	15		✓	▼15		30	30
II	Education (Note: Education and Higher Education subsectors merged.)	30	Ex-officio (Note: University presidents or chairpersons of the board of governors or the council of universities; and responsible persons of statutory bodies, advisory bodies and relevant associations.)	16	✓		New		1,750	1,750
II	Education	30	Elect	14		✓	▼46		1,750	1,750
II	Sports, Performing Arts, Culture and Publication (Note: Originally under the Third Sector.)	30	Nominate (Note: Nominated respectively by the Sports Federation and Olympic Committee of Hong Kong, China, China Federation of Literary and Art Circles Hong Kong Member Association and Hong Kong Publishing Federation.)	15	✓		New		223	223
II	Sports, Performing Arts, Culture and Publication	30	Elect	15		✓	▼45		223	223
II	Medical and Health Services (Note: Medical and Health Services subsectors merged.)	30	Ex-officio	15	✓		New		82	82
II	Medical and Health Services	30	Elect	15		✓	▼45		82	82
II	Chinese Medicine	30	Nominate (Note: Nominated from among Hong Kong members of the Council of the World Federation of Chinese Medicine Societies.)	15	✓		New		51	51
II	Chinese Medicine	30	Elect	15		✓	▼15		51	51
II	Social Welfare	30	Ex-officio	15	✓		New		144	144
II	Social Welfare	30	Elect	15		✓	▼45		144	144
Third Sector		300					0		1,286	1,286
III	Agriculture and Fisheries	60	Elect			✓	0		151	151
III	Labour	60	Elect			✓	0		407	407
III	Grassroots associations	60	Elect			✓	New		404	404
III	Associations of Chinese Fellow Townsmen	60	Elect			✓	New		324	324
III	Religious	60	Nominate			✓	0			N/A
Fourth Sector		300					0		2,100	2,100
IV	Members of the Legislative Council	90	Ex-officio		✓		▲20 (Note: Expanded from the size of the Legislative Council.)			N/A
IV	Heung Yee Kuk	27	Elect		✓		▲1	160		160
IV	Representatives of Members of Area Committees, District Fight Crime Committees, and District Fire Safety Committees of Hong Kong Island and Kowloon (Note: Hong Kong and Kowloon District Councils subsector replaced.)	76	Elect		✓		New	1,083		1,083
IV	Representatives of Members of Area Committees, District Fight Crime Committees, and District Fire Safety Committees of the New Territories (Note: New Territories District Councils subsector replaced.)	80	Elect		✓		New	857		857
IV	Representatives of Associations of Hong Kong Residents in the Mainland	27	Nominate (Note: Nominated by associations of Hong Kong residents in the Mainland.)		✓		New			N/A
Fifth Sector		300					New	451		451
V	HKSAR Deupties to the NPC and HKSAR Members of the CPPCC National Committee (Note: Originally from the Fourth Sector, two subsectors are combined.)	190	Ex-officio		✓		▲103			N/A
V	Representatives of Hong Kong Members of Relevant National Organisations	110	Elect		✓		New	451		451

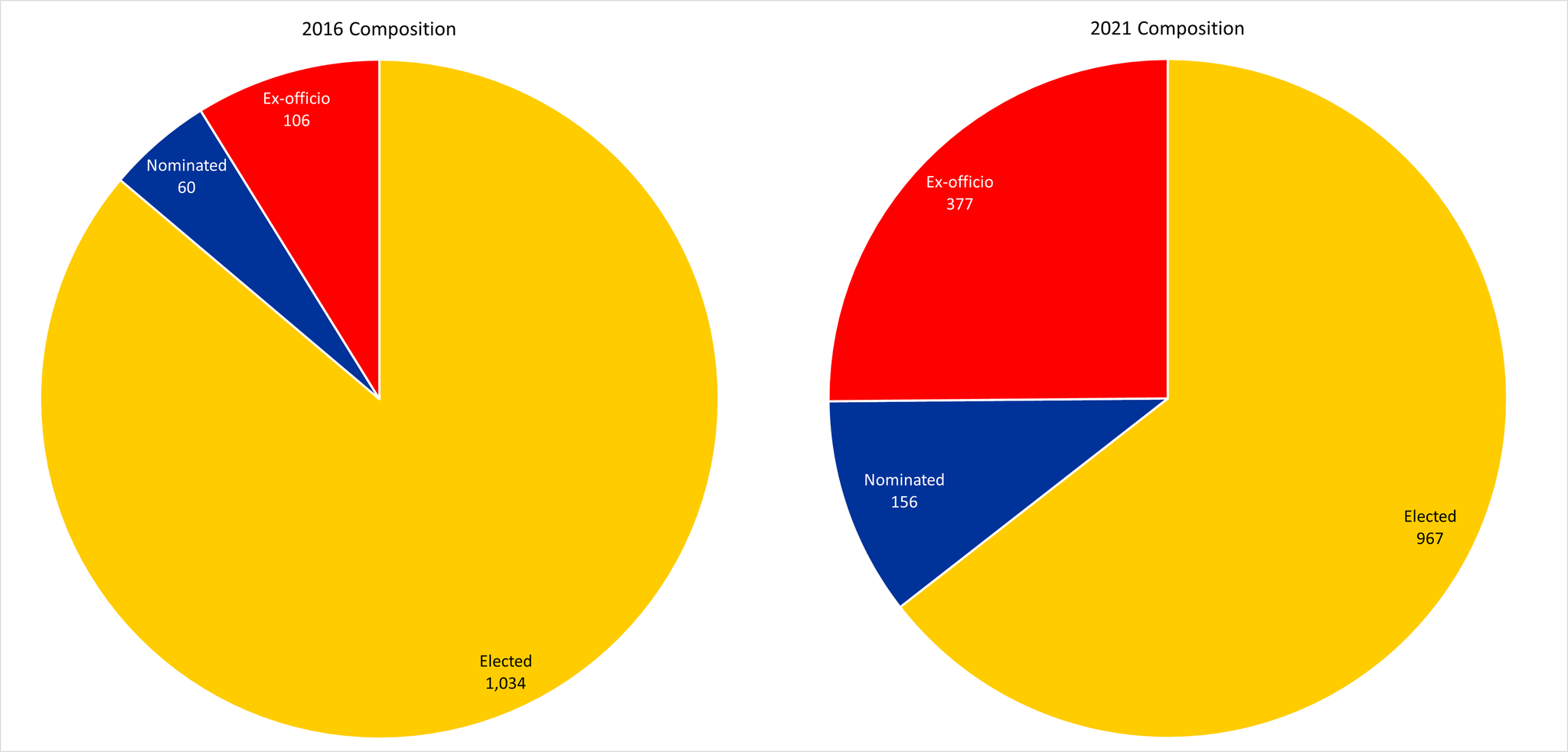
Changes to the composition of the Election Committee: 2016 composition (1,200 seats): Elected (1,034); Nominated (60); Ex-officio (106); 2021 composition (1,500 seats): Elected (967); Nominated (156); Ex-officio (377)

Under the amended Annex I of the Basic Law of Hong Kong passed by the National People's Congress Standing Committee (NPCSC) on 30 March 2021, the size of the Election Committee (EC) would be increased from 1,200 to 1,500 seats, with an additional 300-seat Fifth Sector to be added to the existing four sectors of 300 seats each. According to the amendment of the Annex II, the newly elected Election Committee would also be responsible for electing 40 of the 90 seats of the redesigned Legislative Council, shrinking the directly elected seats from 35 to 20 seats.

The seats of the traditional strongholds of the pro-democrats in the Second Sector of professions, including Education and Social Welfare subsectors, would be halved. The original Education and Higher Education subsectors which had 30 seats each would be merged into a 30-seat subsector, while Medical and Health Services subsectors which had 30 seats each would also be merged into a 30-seat subsector. Some of the seats in the other pro-democratic strongholds would also be nominated rather than elected. For instances, half of 30 members of the newly created Technology and Innovation subsector would be nominated from among Hong Kong academicians of the Chinese Academy of Sciences and the Chinese Academy of Engineering; while 15 of the 30-seat Accountancy subsector would be nominated from among Hong Kong accounting advisers appointed by the Chinese Ministry of Finance; nine seats in the Legal subsector would be nominated from the council of the China Law Society. Up to half of the seats from the subsectors of Engineering, Architectural, Surveying, Planning and Landscape, Education, Medical and Health Services, and Social Welfare would be elected by associations instead of individuals.

In the Fourth Sector, all of the 117-seat Hong Kong and Kowloon and New Territories District Councils subsectors on the committee which would be held by the pro-democrats would be eliminated, they would be replaced by "representatives of members of area committees", including members of the government-appointed District Fight Crime Committees and the District Fire Safety Committee of Hong Kong Island, Kowloon and the New Territories who are appointed by the Director of Home Affairs under the Home Affairs Department, as well as representatives of the pro-Beijing associations of Hong Kong residents in the mainland.

Additionally, a new 300-seat Fifth Sector would consist of the 190 seats including the Hong Kong deputies to the National People’s Congress (NPC) and the Hong Kong members of the National Committee of the Chinese People’s Political Consultative Conference (CPPCC), as well as 110 seats comprising representatives of "Hong Kong members of relevant national organisations".

Under the amended annexes, a Candidate Eligibility Review Committee would be set up to vet the qualifications of candidates, based on the approval of the Hong Kong Committee for Safeguarding National Security according to the review by the National Security Department of the Hong Kong Police Force (HKPF) of which its decision would be final and could not be appealed.

Under the new system, the registered voters for the Election Committee dropped by almost 97 per cent, sharply declining from 246,440 voters in 2016 to only 7,891 voters in 2021. The Education subsector remained the largest electorates with 1,725 voters, but was also drastically dropped from more than 80,000 voters in the last election. More than half of the 30 seats would also be held by ex officio members, instead of being directly elected. There were also 404 bodies registered as "grassroots organisations" for the newly created Grassroots Associations subsector, but some entities such as the Modern Mummy Group, Tai Kok Tsui Friends, and the Chinese Arts Papercutting Association were little known to the public, and were reportedly all satellite organisations of the pro-Beijing New Territories Association of Societies.

== Nominations ==
In the nomination period from 6 to 12 August, the Electoral Affairs Commission received a total of 1,016 individual nominations, competing for 967 seats in 36 subsectors. The remaining 533 seats would be nominated by the designated organisations and by ex officio members. Among the 1,016 nominations, 603 of those were returned uncontested. Only 413 candidates who were running in the 13 of the 36 electable subsectors would have a contested race, equal to around a quarter of the Election Committee seats.

On 26 August 2021, Chief Secretary for Administration John Lee, who also chaired the newly established Candidate Eligibility Review Committee, announced that the invalidation of the registration application of the only localist camp legislators Cheng Chung-tai who was supposedly an ex officio member in the Election Committee. Pierre Chan, the remaining non-establishment legislator along with Cheng, did not register as ex officio member.

As a result, all but two nominated candidates were from the pro-Beijing camp: moderate party Third Side founder Tik Chi-yuen and pro-democracy Sai Kung District Council chairperson Francis Chau. Jason Poon, another moderate construction company owner who blew the whistle on the 2018 MTR Sha Tin to Central Link construction scandal, failed to be nominated through Religious subsector after drawing lots.

== Election results ==
The voting atmosphere in the city was down as 99.9 per cent of Hong Kong voters in legislative election were ineligible to vote in Election Committee elections. The security was tight as the number of deployed police officers outweighed number of voters, about 6,000 police deployed on standby for an election participated by only 4,800 voters.

The election, with the record turnout of 89.77 per cent, was a big win for pro-Beijing camp as expected, winning all but one seats. Tik Chi-yuen was the only non-establishment elected member only after drawing lots due to same number of votes with another candidate. The Democratic Alliance for the Betterment and Progress of Hong Kong (DAB) continued their domination in the camp, claiming to have won more than 150 seats. The Hong Kong Federation of Trade Unions (FTU) ranked the second with 76 seats, and Business and Professionals Alliance for Hong Kong (BPA) coming next with at least 40 seats, while the New People's Party and the Liberal Party said to have 21 and more than 15 seats respectively. As some candidates did not reveal their party affiliation, the numbers from the parties could not be verified.

The vote count soon emerged as controversy for consuming 14 hours although there are only 4,389 ballots, much slower than previous elections. The Electoral Affairs Commission apologised for the clumsiness. Some pro-Beijing politicians and parties, including the Chief Executive, demanded the commission to explain and review the process.

=== Results by subsector ===
Statistics are generated from the official election website:

Sector	Sub-sector	Registered voters			Candidates	Elected	Votes	Turnout
Sector	Sub-sector	Bodies	Individuals	Total	Candidates	Elected	Votes	Turnout
I	Catering	135	-	135	16	16	uncontested	
I	Commercial (First)	22	-	22	16	16	uncontested	
I	Commercial (Second)	71	-	71	17	17	uncontested	
I	Commercial (Third)	93	-	93	18	17	91	97.85
I	Employers' Federation of Hong Kong	18	-	18	15	15	uncontested	
I	Finance	55	-	55	17	17	uncontested	
I	Financial Services	195	-	195	17	16	188	96.41
I	Hotel	57	-	57	15	15	uncontested	
I	Import and Export	45	-	45	17	17	uncontested	
I	Industrial (First)	35	-	35	17	17	uncontested	
I	Industrial (Second)	97	-	97	17	17	uncontested	
I	Insurance	88	-	88	20	17	82	93.18
I	Real Estate and Construction	91	-	91	16	16	uncontested	
I	Small and Medium Enterprises	194	-	194	15	15	uncontested	
I	Textiles and Garment	57	-	57	17	17	uncontested	
I	Tourism	131	-	131	17	17	uncontested	
I	Transport	199	-	199	17	17	uncontested	
I	Wholesale and Retail	63	-	63	17	17	uncontested	
I	Sub-total for First Sector	1,646	-	1,646	301	296	361	96.01
II	Accountancy	39	-	39	15	15	uncontested	
II	Architectural, Surveying and Planning	55	-	55	17	15	55	100.00
II	Chinese Medicine	51	-	51	16	15	50	98.04
II	Education	1,750	-	1,750	14	13	1,469	83.94
II	Engineering	60	-	60	15	15	uncontested	
II	Legal	30	-	30	16	15	30	100.00
II	Medical and Health Services	82	-	82	24	14	79	96.34
II	Social Welfare	144	-	144	24	12	136	94.44
II	Sports, Performing Arts, Culture and Publication	223	-	223	14	14	uncontested	
II	Technology and Innovation	54	-	54	15	14	54	100.00
II	Sub-total for Second Sector	2,488	-	2,488	170	142	1,873	86.59
III	Agriculture and Fisheries	151	-	151	60	60	uncontested	
III	Associations of Chinese Fellow Townsmen	324	-	324	57	57	uncontested	
III	Grassroots Associations	404	-	404	59	59	uncontested	
III	Labour	407	-	407	72	60	395	97.05
III	Sub-total for Third Sector	1,286	-	1,286	248	236	395	97.05
IV	Heung Yee Kuk	-	160	160	27	27	uncontested	
IV	Representatives of Members of Area Committees, District Fight Crime Committees, and District Fire Safety Committees of Hong Kong and Kowloon	-	1,083	1,083	78	76	969	89.47
IV	Representatives of Members of Area Committees, District Fight Crime Committees, and District Fire Safety Committees of the New Territories	-	857	857	82	80	791	92.30
IV	Sub-total for Fourth Sector	-	2,100	2,100	187	183	1,760	90.72
V	Representatives of Hong Kong Members of Relevant National Organisations	-	451	451	110	110	uncontested	
	TOTAL	5,420	2,551	7,971	1,016	967	4,389	89.77

=== Results by affiliation ===
Summary of the 19 September 2021 Election Committee Subsector election results
Affiliation	1st Sector		2nd Sector		3rd Sector		4th Sector		5th Sector		Total	
Affiliation	Standing	Elected	Standing	Elected	Standing	Elected	Standing	Elected	Standing	Elected	Standing	Elected
Democratic Alliance for the Betterment and Progress of Hong Kong	7	7	2	2	9	9	43	42	5	5	66	65
Hong Kong Federation of Trade Unions	-	-	-	-	50	46	9	9	1	1	60	56
New People's Party/Civil Force	3	3	-	-	-	-	7	7	-	-	10	10
Federation of Hong Kong and Kowloon Labour Unions	-	-	-	-	15	9	-		-	-	15	9
Liberal Party	5	5	-	-	-	-	2	2	-	-	7	7
Business and Professionals Alliance for Hong Kong	-	-	-	-	1	1	2	2	3	3	6	6
Path of Democracy	-	-	2	2	-	-	-	-	-	-	2	2
Federation of Public Housing Estates	-	-	-	-	-	-	2	2	-	-	2	2
Hong Kong Direct Subsidy Scheme Schools Council	-	-	1	1	-	-	-	-	-	-	1	1
Hong Kong Federation of Education Workers	-	-	1	1	-	-	-	-	-	-	1	1
Hong Kong Senior Government Officers Association	-	-	-	-	1	1	-	-	-	-	1	1
Hong Kong Securities & Futures Professionals Association	1	0	-	-	-	-	-	-	-	-	1	0
Pro-Beijing independents	285	281	162	135	172	170	123	120	102	102	844	808
Total for pro-Beijing camp	301	296	168	141	248	236	187	183	110	110	1,014	966
Third Side	-	-	1	1	-	-	-	-	-	-	1	1
Independent democrat	-	-	1	0	-	-	-	-	-	-	1	0
Total	301	296	170	142	248	236	187	183	110	110	1,016	967

Note: There are two candidates have dual membership of the Democratic Alliance for the Betterment and Progress of Hong Kong (DAB) and the Hong Kong Federation of Trade Unions (FTU).

== See also ==
- 2021 Hong Kong legislative election
- 2022 Hong Kong Chief Executive election
