= Yuan (surname) =

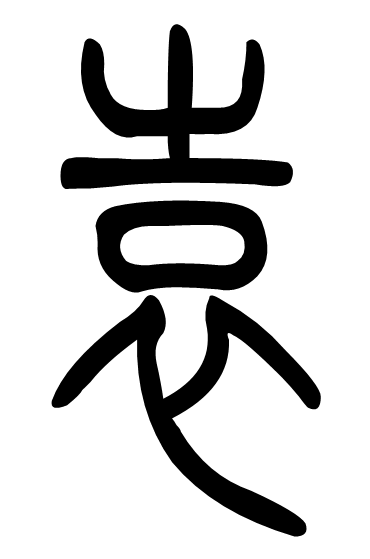
- The character "Yuan", in small seal style, adapted from the 2nd century Yuan An stele
- Pronunciation: Yuán (Mandarin); Yuen (Cantonese); Oan (Hokkien); Wang (Teochew); Viên (Vietnamese); Won (Korean)
- Language: Chinese

Origin
- Meaning: Name of a noble family of the ancient state of Chen
- Region of origin: China

Yuan (袁, Mandarin pronunciation: [ɥɛ̌n]) is a Chinese surname ranked 37th in China by population in 2019. In Standard Chinese, the surname is transliterated Yuán (hanyu pinyin) or Yüen^{2}" (Wade-Giles). Other romanizations include Yeu (Shanghainese), Ion (Chang-Du Gan), Yuen (Cantonese), Oan (Hokkien/Min Nan), Wang (Teochew), Won (Korean), and Viên (Vietnamese). Pronunciation differs widely from region to region.

According to tradition, the surname originated from a noble family of the ancient state of Chen, in what is now eastern Henan province. The written form of the character took its current standardised form around the 1st century. During the Han dynasty, it was associated with the powerful Yuan clan of Ru'nan and later during Jin and Southern dynasties, with the Yuan clan of Chen.

Historically, the name has been fast growing amongst Han Chinese, and has also been taken up by various non-Chinese ethnic groups. The surname is now held by more than 6.5 million people worldwide, and makes up 0.54% of the population of mainland China. Although growth has tapered off in the past six centuries, the Yuan name is still relatively widespread throughout China, as well as among overseas Chinese, with heaviest per capita concentrations in the Yangtze Delta region of central coastal China.

Because the Yangtze Delta region has historically exhibited high clan consciousness, there exist a large number of Yuan genealogies, most of which are now held in public institutions. Renewed interest in ancestry outside mainland China has been encouraged by the PRC government.

It is the 59th name on the Hundred Family Surnames poem.

== Origin of the surname ==
Traditional sources trace the surname to Yuan Taotu, a 7th-century BC Chen nobleman, who was part of a collateral branch of the family of the marquis ruling that state. He selected the second character in his grandfather's style name, Boyuan (伯爰), to be his own family name. Yuan Taotu was granted a feoff in Yangjia (陽夏), in what is now Taikang county, Henan. This estate is regarded as the ancestral home of the earliest Yuan clan. Through its connection with the ruling family of Chen, the Yuan house could also claim ancestry from the great legendary Emperor Shun. Descendants of Yuan house are mentioned by name in the Zuo Zhuan as holding high office in the state of Chen until it was extinguished by Chu in 479 BC.

An alternate, much less widely accepted theory, suggests that the surname Yuan is derived from Xuanyuan (軒轅 or 玄袁), the clan name of the Yellow Emperor. After his death, the Yellow Emperor's estates came to be called Yuanyi (袁邑), and his descendants took their place of birth as a surname.

Prior to the unification of China in 221 BC, the surname is only known to have been present in the historical domain of Chen. Some members of the Yuan clan are known to have moved to Zheng and other neighbouring states. The process of emigration from the Yangjia heartland continued after unification. An example of this is the case of Yuan Ang, a minister to Emperor Gao of Han. His family was forced by banditry to move to Anling, in the area of modern Xi'an, some 500 km west of their ancestral homeland.

The surname Yuan could be written in at least five different ways in early Han times, and they were used interchangeably in pre-Han times. By the 1st century, the name had taken a largely standardised form (袁), which remains to the present day. An early dictionary, the Shuowen, defines this character as "a long garment", but this archaic meaning had already fallen into disuse. The Han text Qian fu lun (潛夫論: "Comments of a Recluse") suggests that the character was derived from either 1) the character ai (哀), meaning "sorrow, grief"; or 2) a combination of the characters gong (公: "lord") and gu (谷: "grain").

== Early Yuan clans ==
Until the end of the Han dynasty, the heartland of the Yuan house was still in the area of the ancient state of Chen. Around the 1st century, three Yuan clans rose to sufficient national importance to be mentioned in the dynastic histories. All were located in close proximity of each other, on the tributaries of the Huai River. One maintained its estates at Fuyue (扶樂), in Chen (陳); another was based at Ruyang (汝陽) in Ru'nan (汝南); and a third of lesser importance was associated with Yingchuan (潁川). All three clans produced members of a land-owning gentry which began to participate increasingly in local and national government, although only the first two are known of in any detail.

=== The Ru'nan Yuan ===
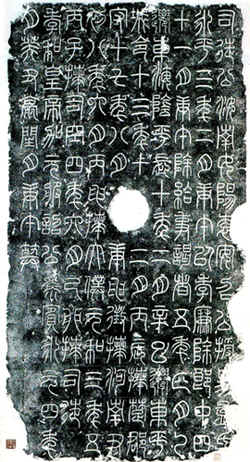
Commemorative stele honouring Yuan An, erected in 117.

The most well-known group were undoubtedly the Yuan clan of Runan. According to local genealogies, the Ru'nan Yuan estates were in the vicinity of the modern township of Yuanlao (袁老), bordering the Fen River (汾水) in the south. There are still some 20,000 Yuan in the area and around a third of the population of Yuanlao there still bears the name Yuan.

The Yuan clan of Ru'nan became known among the gentry for its learning in the I Ching, which was passed on between generations. The scholar Yuan Liang (袁良), the earliest Ru'nan Yuan known by name, was an aide to the heir apparent, the future Emperor Ming of Han. His grandson Yuan An (袁安) made the family's fortunes, rising rapidly through the bureaucracy from 70 AD onwards, reaching the post of Minister over the Masses and playing an important role in policy decisions at the Han court until his death in 92.

One of his sons took the highest military post and two of his grandsons both reached the rank of "Three Excellencies". They did not, however, play any significant role in the executive, and usually appeared instead as power brokers during critical events, such as the coup d'etat against Liang Ji in 159. The reputation and power of the Ru'nan Yuan was maintained with a network of clients and associates, and through intermarriage with other powerful lineages. In addition, during the reigns of Emperors Huan and Ling, clansman Yuan She was an eunuch supporting Yuan Wei and Yuan Feng. At the time of Emperor Ling of Han's death in 189, the clan was undisputed as the most influential in the empire. Most of its leading members lived at the capital Luoyang and some of its sons, such as Yuan Shao (袁紹), were born there.

Yuan Shao and his half-brother Yuan Shu (袁術) played leading roles in the massacre of the eunuchs in September 189 and in the succeeding years both became regional warlords. Yuan Shu declared himself emperor in 197, basing his claim to the throne on descent from Emperor Shun, and died shortly afterwards. Yuan Shao dominated much of north China until he was decisively defeated by Cao Cao at the Battle of Guandu in 200. Following his death in 202, the cohesion of Ru'nan Yuan and its followers as a national power collapsed.

=== The Yuan of Chen ===
The other Yuan clan of importance were based in the county of Fuyue, Chen Commandery (part of what is now Taikang county). Like the Ru'nan Yuan, they produced generations of high officials. One of the first whose background can be verified is Yuan Huan (袁渙), who served Cao Cao and later his son Cao Pi in the civil bureaucracy. Yuan Huan does not seem to have been connected to the Ru'nan Yuan and his career was not affected by their downfall. Of his three sons who lived to adulthood, all were granted official positions under the Nine-rank system.

The Chen Yuan were among the northern aristocratic clans that retreated south as north China was overrun by the Xiongnu. According to the great 10th century genealogist Liu Fang: "Across the Yangzi River, the elite clans were known as 'émigré clans'; the Wang (王), Xie (謝), Yuan, and Xiao (萧) were the greatest among them." When Sima Rui established the Eastern Jin at Jiankang in 317, he did so with the support of powerful members of these great families. The Chen Yuan brought with them dependants and armed retainers, and they were eventually able to carve out large estates for themselves in the peripheral frontier districts. One branch of the clan settled in Yichun, in east-central China. Eventually it grew to such size that the prefecture was renamed Yuanzhou (袁州) in the early 7th century.

During the Eastern Jin and the Southern dynasties period, the Chen Yuan established extensive marriage alliances with the other major clans, especially the Xie, whose ancestral lands were in the same county. The clan also provided consorts for the imperial family, including the empresses of Emperor Wen of Southern Song and Emperor Wu of Qi. The Chen Yuan had strong traditions of scholarly accomplishment rather than military leadership. It produced a number of notable scholars such as the historian Yuan Hong (袁宏) and the poet Yuan Shansong (袁山松). Among the four great émigré clans, the Yuan were notable for never making a bid for military power.

A branch of the Chen Yuan moved north around 420 and settled in Luoyang, later serving the Northern Wei. Upon the conquest of the Chen dynasty by Sui in 589, members of the southern ruling elite, such as Yuan Xian (袁憲), were moved to the capital Chang'an where they continued to serve in government. A number of Tang dynasty noblemen trace their ancestry directly to the Chen Yuan.

== Spread of the surname ==
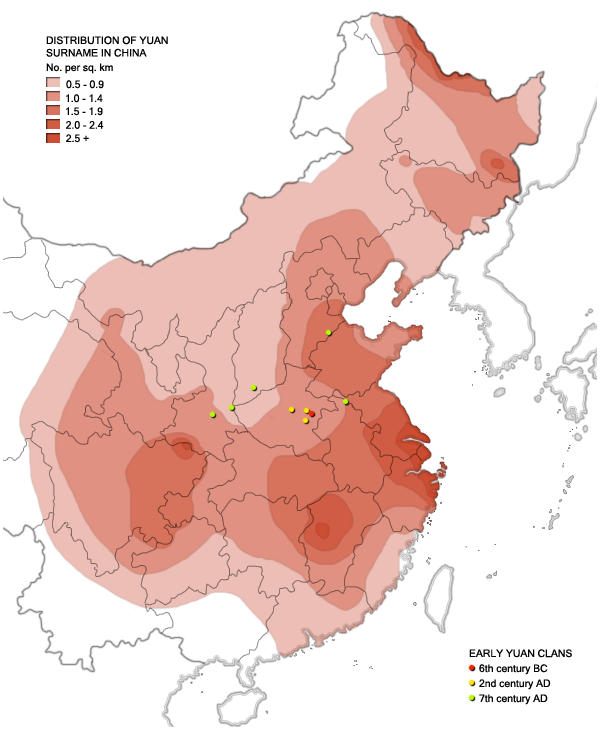
Distribution of the surname in China, 2000. Present-day administrative division boundaries are shown.

In general, the spread of the Yuan surname has followed the migration of Han Chinese throughout mainland China, Hong Kong, Taiwan and Southeast Asia. The general trend over the past 1500 years has been a shift from north to south and southeast.

The main branches of the Yuan clan after the Han dynasty were all in north China, most of them in population centres near the Yellow River. In the 3rd century members of the Chen Yuan are known to have moved as far south as the Red River delta in modern Vietnam. Early migrations south established Yuan clans along the lower Yangtze River, in Danyang, Lujiang, Wuxi, Yangzhou and Nanjing. Records from the Tang dynasty name three major Yuan clans, in Ru'nan, Pengcheng and Yichun.

Larger scale migrations south occurred during the middle and late Song dynasty, when north China was overrun by the Jurchens and later the Mongols. Yuan clans appeared in what is now Zhejiang (Hangzhou, Ningbo, Fenghua and Yinxian), Jiangxi (Nanchang) and Fujian (Fu'an). The name was already widespread in the 12th century, being concentrated in what is now Sichuan, Zhejiang and Shanxi.

Around the beginning of the Ming dynasty in the late 14th century, population booms in the lower Yangtze River valley made Jiangxi, Jiangsu and Zhejiang the three most populous provinces for the Yuan name. The southern coastal provinces of Fujian and Guangdong also experienced significant increases.

By the Qing dynasty, Yuan had penetrated to the frontier lands of Yunnan in the southwest, Guangxi in the south, Liaoning in the northeast and Taiwan in the southeast. Many in Guangdong and Fujian migrated south to Southeast Asia, especially Singapore and Indonesia.

Up until the 15th century, growth in the Yuan name consistently outstripped that of the general population, but this rate has fallen below average over the past six centuries. This period has seen a resurgence of the Yuan name in northern provinces, so much so that Sichuan and Hebei are now the most important in terms of absolute population. The Yuan name is most populous as a percentage of local populations in the Yangtze Delta region, in northwestern Jiangxi and in the border region between Shaanxi and Sichuan. In 1994, for example, there were 97,400 Yuan in Shanghai, ranked 30th by population – slightly higher than the national average. Yuanjia'ao in Fenghua District, Zhejiang, takes part of its name from the Yuan family. In northeast China, Heilongjiang is home to concentrations in the southeast of the province as well as a lengthy strip along the Russian border. Generally speaking, the name is relatively absent in the farthest geographical extremes of China, namely southern Yunnan, Guangxi, and the island province of Hainan.

In Taiwan, the surname is ranked 94th by population. Most who hold the name were relatively recent emigres who arrived during the 19th century or at the end of the Chinese Civil War in 1949. They are concentrated in Taipei, Hsinchu, Nantou, Chiayi and Tainan.

=== Adoption by non-Han peoples ===
During the 2nd century, the Yuan surname was taken by one of the three tribal groupings of the Bandun Man, who inhabited what is now Chongqing and Sichuan. This group later migrated north to the Wei River valley, and gradually were absorbed by Han Chinese.

After Emperor Xiaowen of the nomadic Xianbei moved his capital to Luoyang in 494, his clan of Tuoba changed their surname to Yuan (元) to assimilate with the Chinese population. In later centuries, this surname declined and was sometimes subsumed by the more common form of Yuan (袁).

The character of "yuan" (袁) has also been associated with the Gaoju people of Central Asia, who claimed descent from the Xuanyuan clan of the Huang Di. One of their nine clans was called Yuanhe (袁紇) or Yuanwei (袁韋), and one of their twelve major surnames was Qiyuan (乞袁). In 605, the Yuanhe defeated the Göktürks and won leadership over a tribal confederation which came to be called the Huihe (回紇). There have been suggestions that the name of Genghis Khan's tribe, Kiyad (called "Qiyan" 乞顏 or "Qiyin" 乞引 in Chinese), was a corruption of "Qiyuan". Those among the Mongols who retained the Qiyuan surname may have simplified it to "Yuan" after settling in China.

During the early 17th century, during the Qing (Manchu) dynasty, the surname is also known to have been adopted by members of the Eight Banners, including by a number of Manchu bannermen in Shenyang. Today, the surname appears among the Manchu, Mongols, Yao, Yi, Bai, Koreans and Tibetans. There are major Yuan clans among the Yao in Long'an county, Guangxi and in Funing, Yunnan.

The Yuan surname is a relatively minor one in Korea, where it is called Won (원). According to a 2000 census, there were 1,104 individuals bearing the name in South Korea. They trace their ancestry to Won Roebo (袁賚輔) of Bian (安比縣). During the 20th century, the Won clan were centered in the north-central area of South Korea, in the province of Gangwon-do.

== Genealogies ==
Almost all available information on the early origins of the surname come from noble genealogies which were updated and maintained until the 10th century. Some of the aristocratic Yuan families of the Tang dynasty used these registers as a means of upholding their prestige and maintaining influence. These texts were also used as sources for the 5th century story collection Shishuo xinyu (世說新語: "New Tales of the World"). A Yuan clan genealogy from Jiangxi is mentioned in Sui shu (隋书: "Book of Sui") and a Yuan clan temple inscription survives in the anthology of essayist and poet Han Yu. Although no copies of early genealogies are extant today, fragments have been preserved by famed Chinese historian Ouyang Xiu in the 11th century work Xin Tang Shu.

From the time of Ouyang Xiu onwards, the practice of genealogy compilation devolved down to gentry families and became correspondingly more widespread. The clans of the Yangtze Delta and its hinterlands were most active in producing genealogies. Many of the Yuan clan genealogies associate their clans with the Ru'nan Yuan or the Chen Yuan, and in particular trace their ancestries to Yuan An. Yuan Zhijun (袁志君), founder of the Yuan clan of Dongguan and ancestor of the Ming dynasty general Yuan Chonghuan (袁崇煥), for example, claimed to be a 38th generation descendant of Yuan An. A number of collateral branches in Xingning, Meixian and Huiyang also follow the Tongguan clan in the claim. Similarly, the clans of Xinchang, Fenghua and Yinxian, which produced many jinshi degree holders in the Song dynasty, claimed that their ancestor Yuan Yuan (袁元) was a 31st generation descendant of Yuan An. It was not uncommon for clans to build memorial halls, sometimes titled "Ru'nan", "Woxue" (卧雪: "Sleeping in [time of] snow") or "Shouzheng" (守正: "upholding justice"), in honour of Yuan An. Such attempts to trace the origin of clans to a famous individual have interest as a sociological phenomenon rather than for its historical accuracy.

Clan-based activities and genealogies were attacked during the Cultural Revolution, when various movements inspired by the Chinese government attempted to eradicate symbols of the old society. They were relatively successful, so much so that many genealogies have been lost. Most surviving Yuan genealogies on the mainland are now out of private hands.

Some one hundred Yuan clan genealogies are known to be held in government archives or in public libraries in Beijing, Shanghai and Ningbo. A provincial breakdown of the geographic distribution of these genealogies in order of number: Zhejiang (23); Jiangsu (22); Hunan (17); Jiangxi (9); Shandong (9); Sichuan (5); Henan (4); Anhui (3); unknown (7). A few genealogies may also be held in university archives in Japan and the United States. No doubt many more fragments are scattered in villages and townships across China.

== Clan organisation ==
From around the Song dynasty, clans began organising themselves in mutual obligation relationships, often based around the compilation of genealogies. The role of clan elders was often that of moral or Confucian instruction. The Yuan shi shi fan (袁氏世范: "Yuan clan hereditary rules"), by the Song dynasty jinshi Yuan Cai (袁采), was an early manual of ethical behaviour and was regarded by contemporaries as a classic of clan instruction. Toward the late imperial period, these relationships strengthened to the extent that clans sometimes provided social welfare and enforced customary law. Regionally prominent clans often allied together based on a common (and sometimes spurious) ancestor, known as the "first ancestor who moved" (始遷祖).

Renewed interest since the late 1980s by overseas Chinese in root-seeking has been largely encouraged by the government of mainland China as a way of attracting foreign direct investment. In 2001, for example, the Hong Kong Association of Yuen Clansmen (香港袁氏宗親會) donated HKD $1.2 million toward the construction of a Yuan Chonghuan Memorial Park on the site of his Ming dynasty home. In 2004, a group of 68 Yuan clan businessmen from Shenzhen and Hong Kong were invited to Ru'nan county, so-called "ancestral home of all Yuan under Heaven". The group, led by Yuen Mo, a representative of Hong Kong to the National People's Congress, held talks with provincial and local officials with regard to the development of food processing projects in the area.

In recent years, genealogy compilation and clan organisation has seen a resurgence, together with a renewed interest in local history. The 13th "Conference of the Descendants of Shun," held in Ru'nan in 1999, was attended by representatives of Yuan clans from as far afield as Hong Kong and Thailand. A number of local clans are also reorganising themselves and publishing updated versions of their genealogies. In May 2005, after updating their 1939 genealogy, the Yuan clan of Ximen, Ningbo, held a large scale ancestor worship ceremony which was much publicised in the local media. This return to clan consciousness has been limited, however, by increased geographic and social mobility in China.

== Prominent personages ==
=== Pre-modern ===
- Yuan Taotu (c. 7th century BC): nobleman and diplomat of Chen.
- Yuan Ang (died 148 BC): high official of the Former Han, served at the court of Liu Bang.
- Yuan An (died 92): Later Han scholar and official at the court of Emperor He of Han; the leading figure of the Yuan clan of Ru'nan.
- Yuan Shao (died 202): official of the Later Han dynasty, later a warlord who dominated much of northern China in the 190s.
- Yuan Shu (died 199): commander of the imperial guards of the Later Han, later a warlord and self-proclaimed emperor of the abortive Cheng dynasty.
- Yuan Huan (died c. 219): civil servant serving under Cao Cao, one of the leading figures of the Yuan clan of Chen.
- Yuan Hong (328–376): Jin dynasty historian, scholar and official.
- Yuan Shansong (died 399): Jin dynasty lyricist, historian and essayist.
- Yuan Cai (died c. 1195): Song dynasty official and scholar, author of a manual of advice on clan relations, the Yuan shi shi fan.
- Yuan Zongdao (1560–1600): official and scholar. He and his brothers founded the Gong'an school of literary thought.
- Yuan Zhongdao (1575–1630): official and scholar.
- Yuan Hongdao (1568–1610): Ming dynasty poet.
- Yuan Chonghuan (1584–1630): military commander of the Ming dynasty in Liaoning peninsula, later revered as a patriot.
- Yuan Mei (1716–1797): Qing dynasty poet and scholar.
- Yuan Renlin (c. 18th century): linguist, noted for his study of grammatical particles.

=== Modern ===
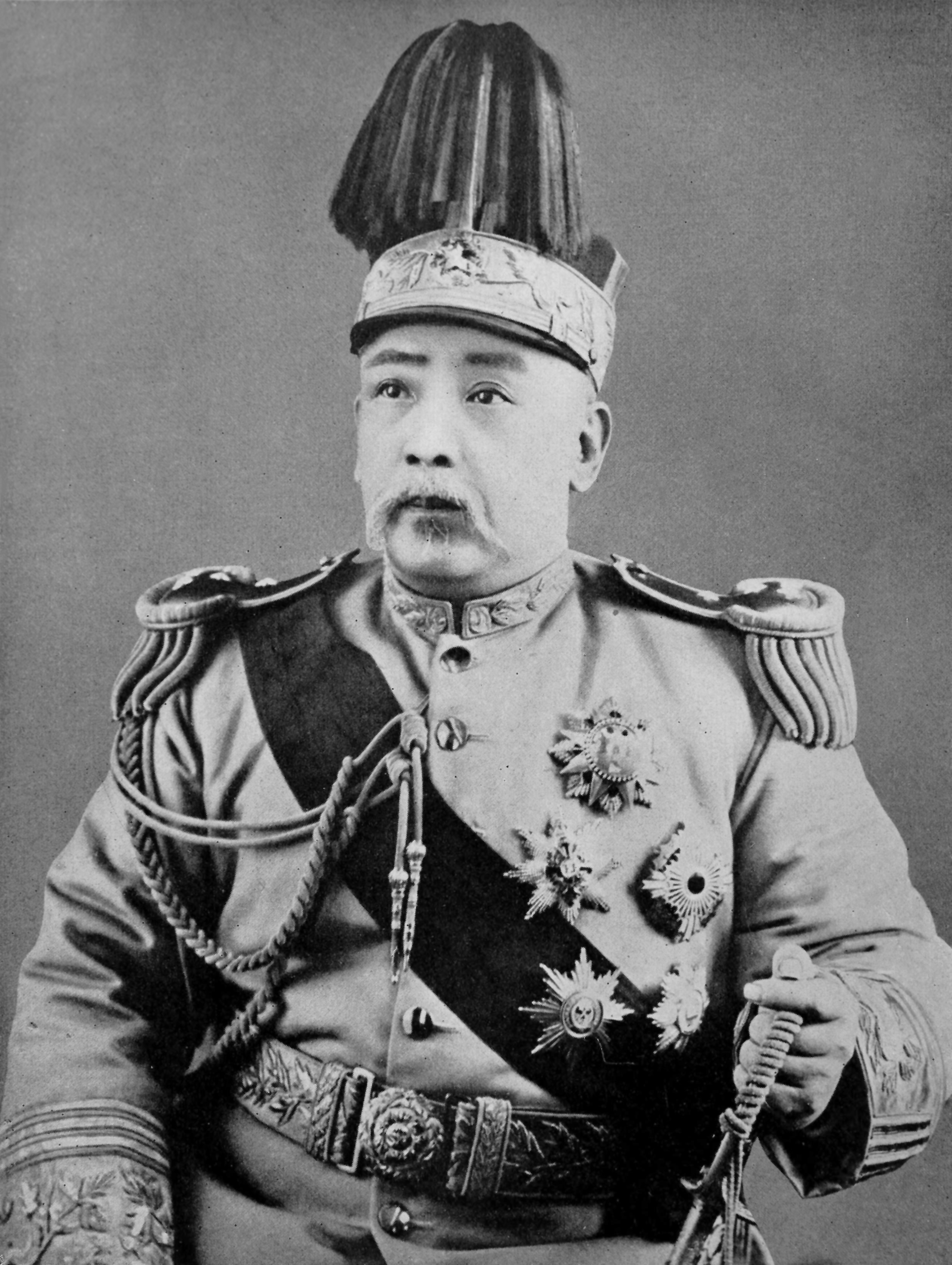
Yuan Shikai, the most well-known person with the surname Yuan in modern history. His descendants are known to live in the United States, United Kingdom, Germany, France, Japan, Canada, Singapore and Malaysia.

- Yuan Dehui (c. 19th century) was an interpreter, best known for translating sections of Emerich de Vattel's Le droit des gens into Chinese.
- Yuan Shikai (1859–1916): military commander of the late Qing dynasty, President of the Republic of China, later self-proclaimed emperor of China.
- Yuan Tze-yu, Deputy Secretary-General of Examination Yuan of the Republic of China
- Yuan Wencai (died 1930): bandit, Communist commander.
- Yuan Muzhi (1909–1978): early left-wing actor and director.
- Yuan Luke Chia-Liu (1912–2003): physicist, grandson of Yuan Shikai, and husband of prominent physicist Chien-Shiung Wu.
- Yuan Baohua (1916–2019): economic planner, former President of Renmin University.
- Yuan Xuefen (1922–2011): pioneer of the Yue opera.
- Yuan Longping (1930–2021): agronomist, known for developing the first hybrid rice varieties in the 1970s.
- Yuan Weishi (born 1931): philosopher and historian, known for criticising the accuracy of Chinese history textbooks.
- Yuan Zhongyi (born 1932): archaeologist, curator of the Terracotta Army museum.
- Yuan Weimin (born 1939): sports administrator and civil servant; Executive President of the Beijing Organising Committee for the XXIX Olympiad.
- Yuan Shoufang (born 1939): General and Director of the General Political Department of the People's Liberation Army.
- Yuen Mo (born 1941): representative to the National People's Congress.
- Yuen Woo-ping (born 1945): martial arts choreographer and director.
- Yuan Yida (born 1947): population genetics researcher and authority on Chinese surnames.
- Yuen Henry (born 1948): high technology entrepreneur, founder of Gemstar International.
- Yuan Guiren (born 1950): academic, and Minister of Education in the PRC.
- Yuan Hongbing (born 1953): former legal academic, now a dissident seeking political asylum in Australia.
- Yuen Cheung-yan (1957–2026): Hong Kong actor, director, stuntman, and fight choreographer.
- Yuan Baojing (1966–2006): investment tycoon, executed for murder in a high-profile case.
- Yuen Nancy (born 1967): operatic soprano.
- Yuen Anita (born 1971): film and television actress.
- Yuen Andrew (born 1972): Hong Kong actor.
- Yuen Fiona (born 1976): actress and TV presenter.
- Yuan Quan (born 1977): television and film actress in mainland China.
- Eric Yuan (born 1969/70): American billionaire, founder and CEO of Zoom Video Communications.
- Yuan Wemyss (born 1976): Chinese-born Scottish badminton player.
- Yuan Shuai (born 1981): Chinese-Singaporean actor.
- Yuan Shu-chi (born 1984): Taiwanese actress.
- Yuan Ye (born 1985): pen name Cuttlefish That Loves Diving, a Chinese web novelist.
- Yuan Bo (born 1987): Chinese racing driver

== See also ==
- List of common Chinese surnames
- Yuan (disambiguation)
