= Economy of the Song dynasty =

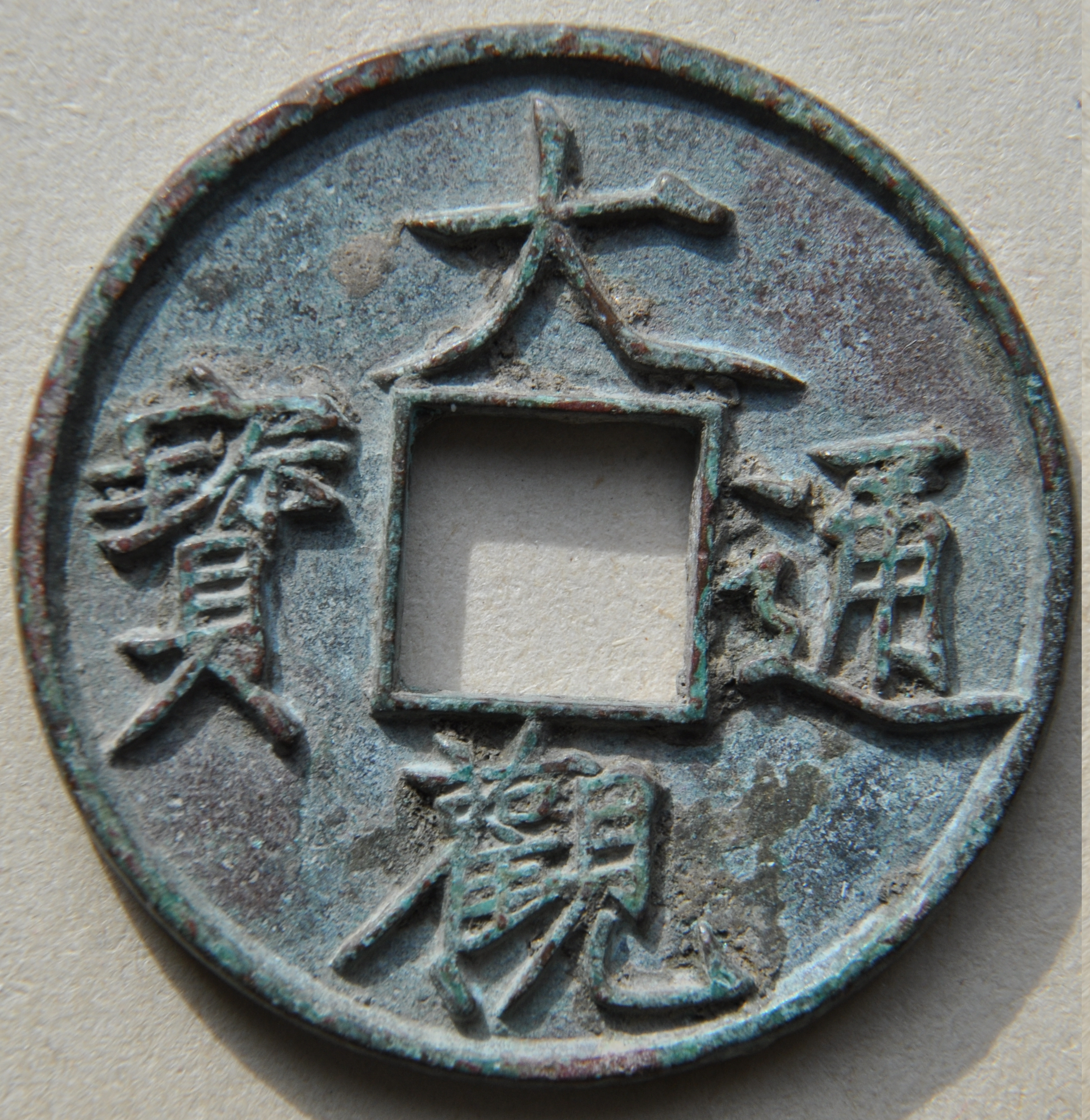
A Northern Song coin (da guan tong bao 大觀通寶)

The economy of the Song dynasty (960–1279) has been characterized as the most prosperous in the world at the time. The dynasty moved away from the top-down command economy of the Tang dynasty (618–907) and made extensive use of market mechanisms as national income grew to be around three times that of 12th century Europe. The dynasty was beset by invasions and border pressure, lost control of North China in 1127, and fell in 1279. Yet the period saw the growth of cities, regional specialization, and a national market. There was sustained growth in population and per capita income, structural change in the economy, and increased technological innovation such as movable print, improved seeds for rice and other commercial crops, gunpowder, water-powered mechanical clocks, the use of coal as an industrial fuel, improved iron and steel production, and more efficient canal locks. China had a steel production of around 100,000 tons plus urban cities with millions of people at the time.

Commerce in global markets increased significantly. Merchants invested in trading vessels and trade which reached ports as far away as East Africa. This period also witnessed the development of the world's first banknote, or printed paper money (see Jiaozi, Guanzi, Huizi), which circulated on a massive scale. A unified tax system and efficient trade routes by road and canal meant the development of a nationwide market. Regional specialization promoted economic efficiency and increased productivity. Although much of the central government's treasury went to the military, taxes imposed on the rising commercial base refilled the coffers and further encouraged the monetary economy. Reformers and conservatives debated the role of government in the economy. The emperor and his government still took responsibility for the economy, but generally made fewer claims than in earlier dynasties. The government did, however, continue to enforce monopolies on certain manufactured items and market goods to boost revenues and secure resources that were vital to the empire's security, such as tea, salt, and chemical components for gunpowder.

These changes led some historians to call Song China an "early modern" economy centuries before Western Europe made its breakthrough. Many of these gains were lost, however, in the following Yuan and Ming dynasties, which replaced the Song use of market mechanisms with top-down command strategies.

== Agriculture ==
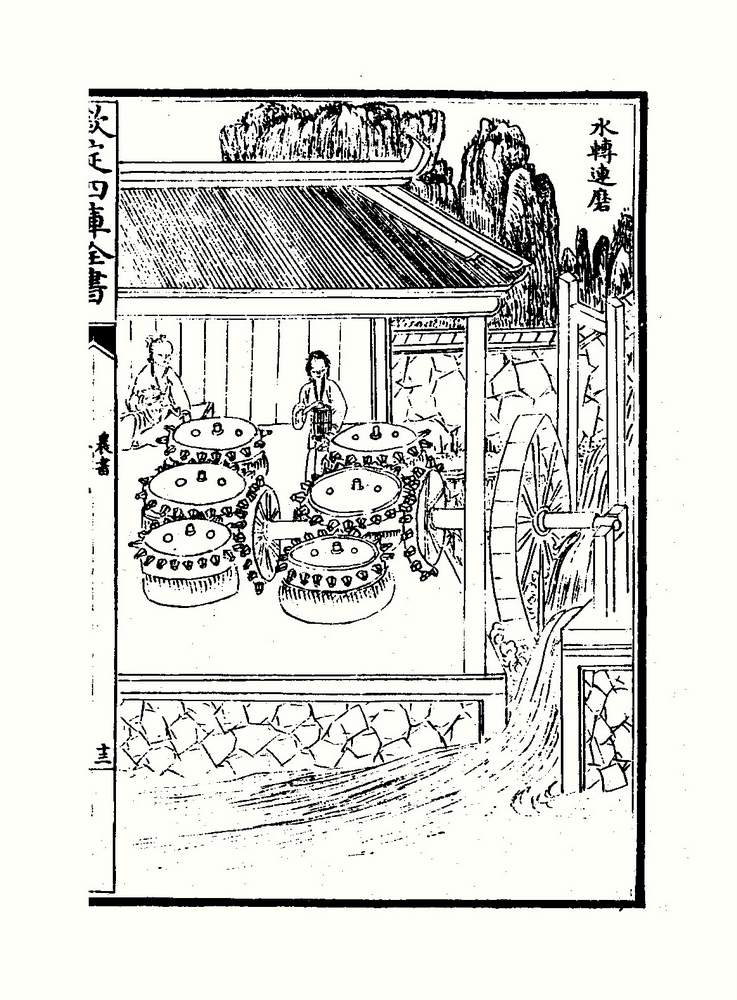
A water-powered grain mill from the Nong shu by Wang Zhen, Yuan dynasty

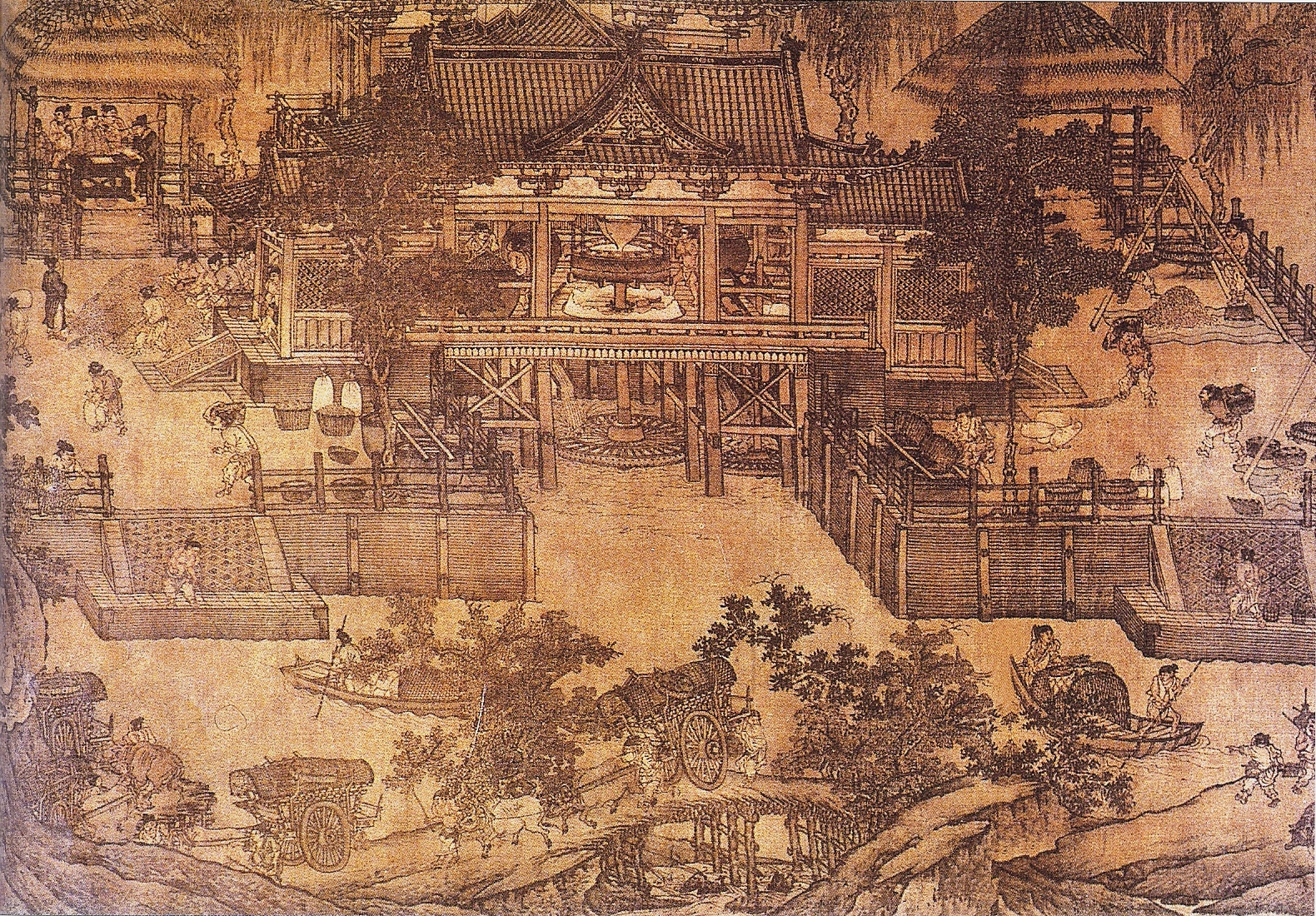
A Northern Song (960–1127) era painting of a water-powered mill for grain, along with river transport.

A "seedling horse" invented during the Song dynasty to pluck out seedlings, 18th c. drawing

=== Expansion ===
There was a massive expansion of ploughland during the Song dynasty. The government encouraged people to reclaim barren lands and put them under cultivation. Anyone who opened up new lands and paid taxes was granted permanent possession of the new land. Under this policy, the cultivated land in the Song dynasty is estimated to have reached a peak area of 720 million mu (48 million hectares) and was not surpassed by later Ming and Qing dynasties.

Irrigation of arable land was also greatly fostered during this period. Prominent statesman and economist Wang Anshi issued the Law and Decree on Irrigation in 1069 that encouraged expansion of the irrigation system in China. By 1076, about 10,800 irrigation projects were completed, which irrigated more than 36 million mu of public and private land. Major irrigation projects included dredging the Yellow River in northern China and artificial silt land in the Lake Tai valley. As a result of this policy, crop production in China tripled. Agricultural yields were about 2 tan (a unit of about 110 pounds or 50 kilograms) of grain per mu during the Song dynasty, compared with 1 tan during the early Han and 1.5 tan during the late Tang.

=== New tools ===
The economic development of China under the Song dynasty was marked by improvements in farm tools, seeds, and fertilizers. The Song inherited the plow innovations described in the Tang dynasty text The Classic of the Plow, which documents their utilization in Jiangnan. The Song improved on the Tang curved iron plough and invented a special steel plough design specifically for reclaiming wasteland. The wasteland plough was not made of iron, but of stronger steel; the blade was shorter but thicker, and particularly effective in cutting through reeds and roots in wetlands in the Huai River valley. A tool designed to facilitate seedling removal called a "seedling horse" was invented under the Song; it was made of jujube wood and paulownia wood. Song farms used bamboo water wheels to harness the flow energy of rivers to raise water for irrigation of farmland.

While there was already a great diversity in agricultural implements of the tread plow (踏犁; tali) because of lacking oxen, of lever-knife (鍘刀; zhadao) and the northeastern-style plow (耥; tang), the use of water power to move millstones, grinding stones and hammers and to move water from canals and rivers to irrigation ditches by a chained-buckets mechanism (翻車; fanche) became more and more usual, especially with large land owners. Until then, water was hoisted by a mechanism where large step-powered wheels (踏車; tache) moved chained buckets with water from the river to a ditch. As an inplement to pluck out rice seedlings peasants made use of the "seedling horse" (秧馬; yangma), planting and fertilizing was the task of a machine called "dung-drill" (糞耬; fenlou). In northern China, a "drill-tiller" (耬耡; louchu) was in use, while in the lower Yangtze region, a "plow-weeder" (耥耘; tangyun) became widespread at the end of Southern Song. For harvesting, a pushing scythe (推鐮; tuilian) with two wheels was invented.

— Ulrich Theobald

The water wheel was about 30 chi in diameter, with ten bamboo watering tubes fastened at its perimeter. Some farmers even used three-stage watering wheels to lift water to a height of over 30 chi.

High-yield Champa paddy seeds, Korean yellow paddy, Indian green pea, and Middle East watermelon were introduced into China during this period, greatly enhancing the variety of farm produce. Song farmers emphasized the importance of night soil as fertilizer. They understood that using night soil could transform barren wasteland into fertile farmland. Chen Pu wrote in his Book of Agriculture of 1149: "The common saying that farmland becomes exhausted after seeding three to five years is not right, if frequently top up with new soil and cure with night soil, then the land becomes more fertile".

=== Cash crops ===
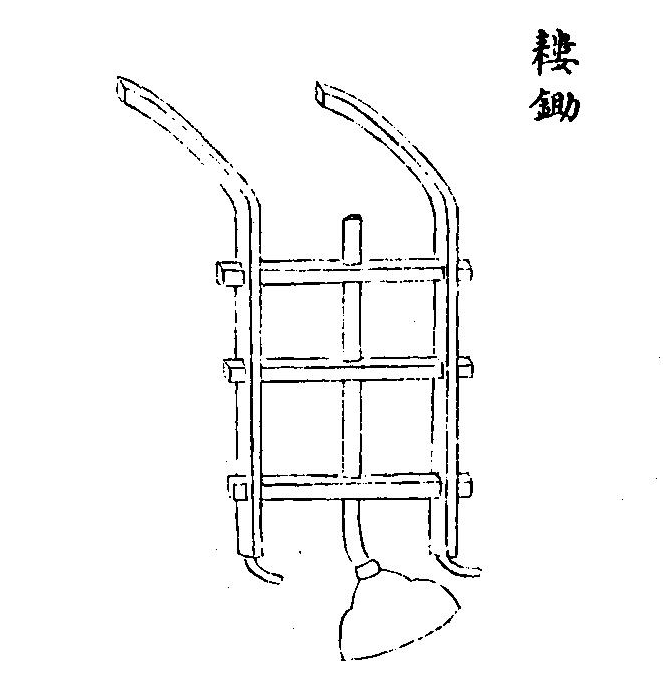
A drill-tiller (louchu) from the Nong shu, Yuan dynasty

The Song period witnessed a rapid expansion of commercial cash crops such as tea, sugar, mulberry, and indigo.

Tea became one of seven common household items - the others being rice, salt, soy sauce, cooking oil, vinegar, and charcoal - during the Song dynasty. Tea houses became a fixture of urban life. As a result of the popularity of tea drinking, tea plantation during the Song period expanded threefold compared to the Tang period. Foreign consumption by Central Asians also fueled the commercialization of tea plantation, particularly in Sichuan. Frontier trade made up a third of Sichuan's tea trade prior to 1104. According to a survey in 1162, tea plantations were spread across 66 prefectures in 244 counties. A variety of tea products were produced with the most prized variety from Raozhou in Jiangxi selling for 500 coins per jin (0.59 kg) while the cheapest teas sold for only 37 coins.

Tea cultivation was at the forefront of development in southern China where the rugged interior upland valleys were unsuitable for rice agriculture. Regions such as Fujian produced only 230,000 kg of tea at the start of the dynasty and increased production to 1.9 million kg by 1084. Most tea plantations were run by rural households but some large private and state-run plantations employed as many as 100 workers. Like the salt industry, tea became a significant source of government income but a monopoly on tea plantation never formed. Despite this, tea production was highly centralized. Outside of Sichuan, a mere five prefectures made up 55 percent of total tea production in 1162. The Beiyuan Plantation (North Park Plantation) was an imperial tea plantation in Fujian. It produced more than forty varieties of tribute tea for the imperial court. Only the very tips of tender tea leaves were picked, processed and pressed into tea cakes, embossed with dragon pattern, known as "dragon tea cakes".

Cotton was introduced from Hainan into central China. Cotton flowers were collected, pits removed, beaten loose with bamboo bows, drawn into yarns and woven into cloth called "jibei". The cotton jibei made in Hainan has great variety, the cloth has great width, often dyed into brilliant colors, stitching up two pieces make a bedspread, stitching four pieces make a curtain Hemp was also widely planted and made into textiles. Independent mulberry farms flourished in the Mount Dongting region in Suzhou. The mulberry farmers did not make a living on farmland, but instead they grew mulberry trees and bred silkworms to harvest silk.

Sugarcane first appeared in China during the Warring States period. During the Song dynasty, Lake Tai valley was famous for the sugarcane cultivated. Song writer Wang Zhuo described in great detail the method of cultivating sugarcane and how to make cane sugar flour from sugarcane in his monograph "Classic of Sugar" in 1154, the first book about sugar technology in China.

With the growth of cities, high value vegetable farms sprang up in the suburbs. In southern China, on average one mu of paddy farm land supported one man, while in the north about three mu for one man, while one mu of vegetable farm supported three men.

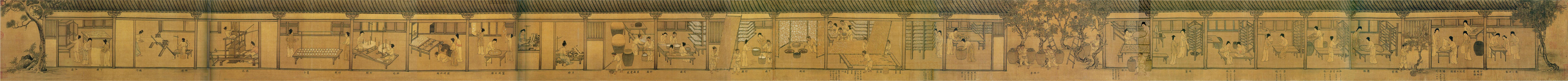
Song silk production facility

== Organization, investment, and trade ==
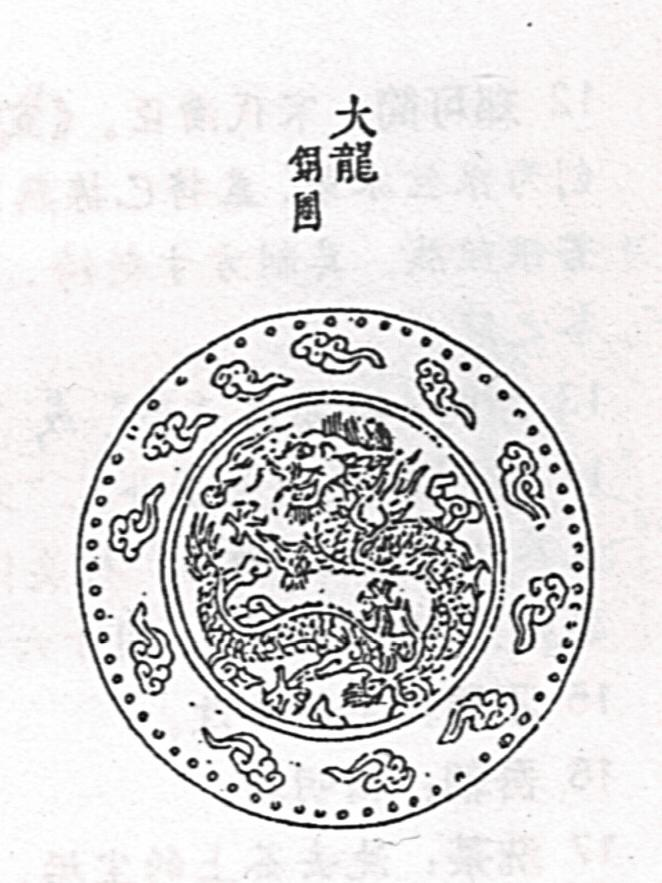
Song tea in the form of a cake called the big dragon cake

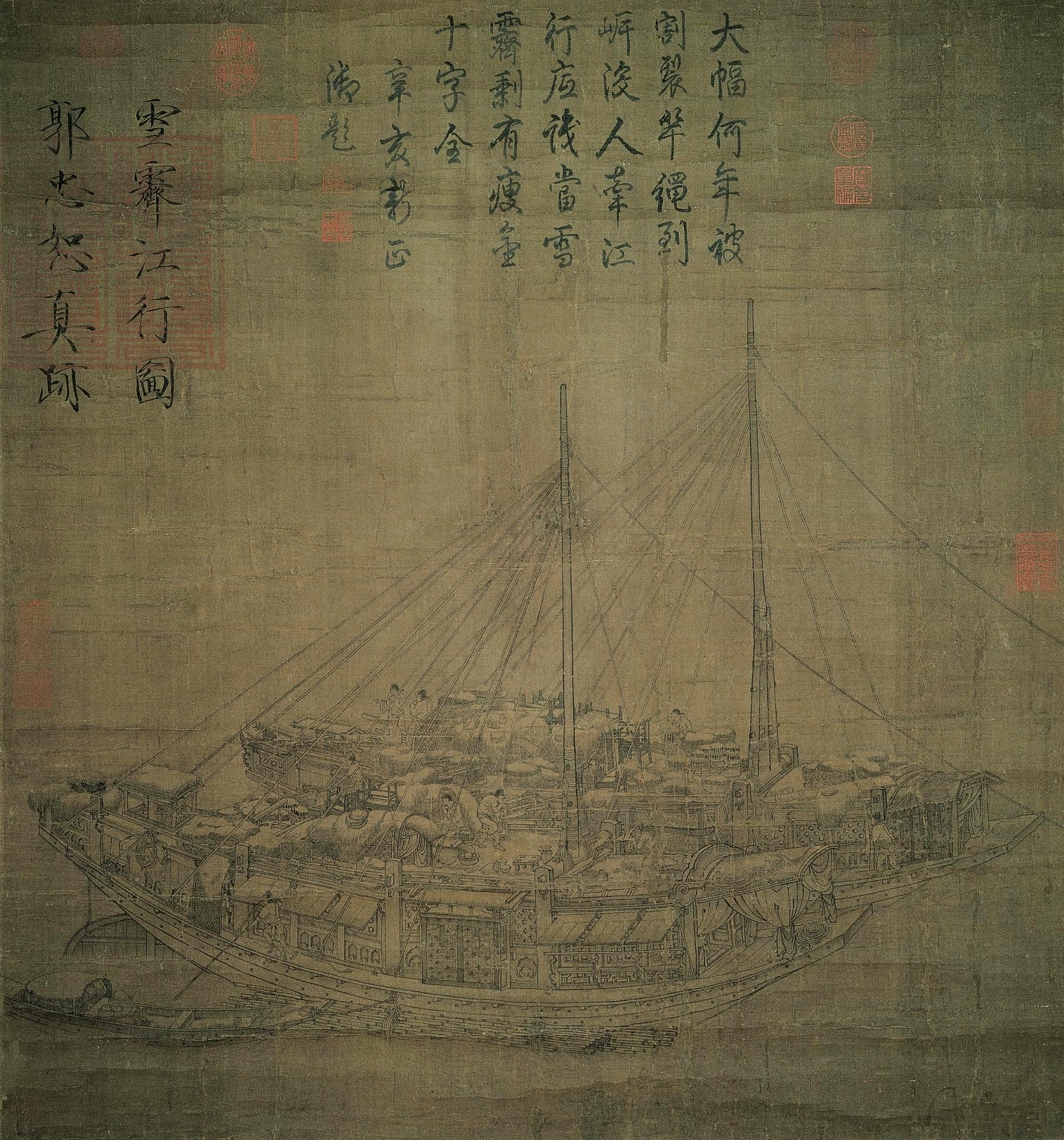
A Song painting on silk of two Chinese cargo ships; Chinese ships of the Song period featured hulls with watertight compartments.

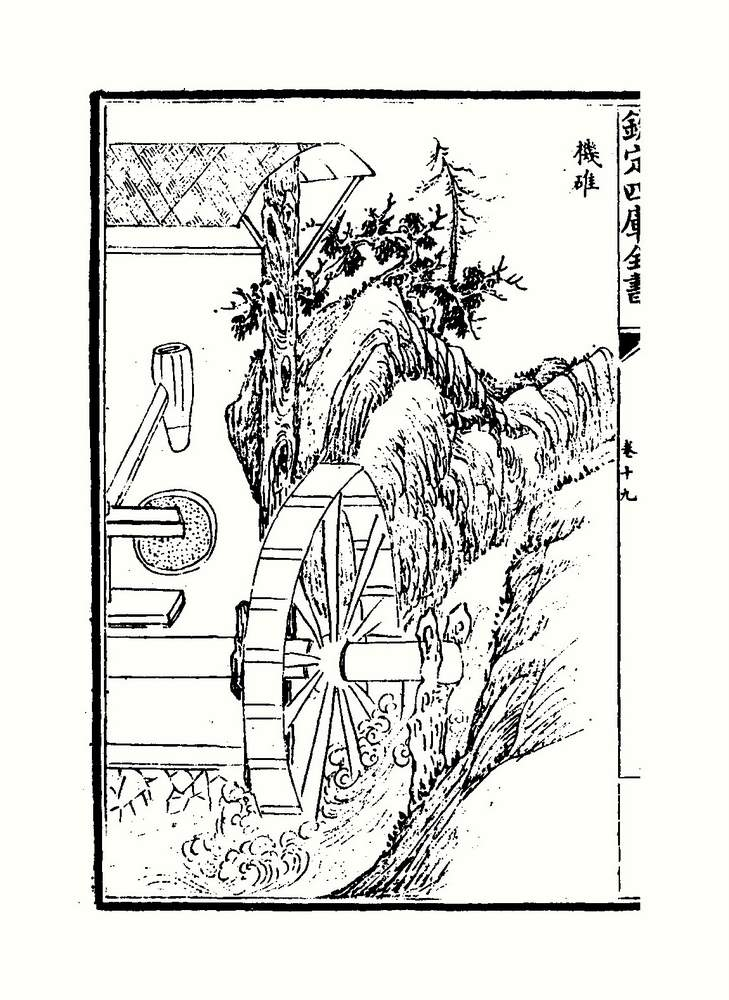
Hydro-powered hammer from the Nong shu, Yuan dynasty

=== Commercialization ===
Although large government-run industries and large privately owned enterprises dominated the market system of urban China during the Song period, there was a plethora of small private businesses and entrepreneurs throughout the large suburbs and rural areas that thrived off the economic boom of the period. There was even a large black market in China during the Song period, which was actually enhanced once the Jurchens conquered northern China and established the Jin dynasty. For example, around 1160 AD there was an annual black market smuggling of some 70 to 80 thousand cattle. There were multitudes of successful small kilns and pottery shops owned by local families, along with oil presses, wine-making shops, small local paper-making businesses, etc. There was also room for small economic success with the "inn keeper, the petty diviner, the drug seller, the cloth trader", and many others.

Rural families that sold a large agricultural surplus to the market not only could afford to buy more charcoal, tea, oil, and wine, but they could also amass enough funds to establish secondary means of production for generating more wealth. Besides necessary agricultural foodstuffs, farming families could often produce wine, charcoal, paper, textiles, and other goods they sold through brokers. Farmers in Suzhou often specialized in raising Bombyx mori to produce silk wares, while in Fujian, Sichuan, and Guangdong, farmers often grew sugarcane. In order to ensure the prosperity of rural areas, technical applications for public works projects and improved agricultural techniques were essential. The vast irrigation system of China had to be furnished with multitudes of wheelwrights mass-producing standardized waterwheels and square-pallet chain pumps that could lift water from lower planes to higher irrigation planes.

For clothing, silken robes were worn by the wealthy and elite while hemp and ramie were worn by the poor; by the late Song period cotton clothes were also in use. Shipment of all these materials and goods was aided by the 10th century innovation of the canal pound lock in China; the Song scientist and statesman Shen Kuo (1031–1095) wrote that the building of pound lock gates at Zhenzhou (presumably Kuozhou along the Yangtze) during the 1020s and 1030s freed up the use of five hundred working laborers at the canal each year, amounting to the saving of up to 1,250,000 strings of cash annually. He wrote that the old method of hauling boats over limited the size of the cargo to 300 tan of rice per vessel (roughly 17 t/17,000 kg), but after the pound locks were introduced, boats carrying 400 tan (roughly 22 t/22,000 kg) could then be used. Shen wrote that by his time (c. 1080) government boats could carry cargo weights of up to 700 tan (39 t/39,000 kg), while private boats could hold as much as 800 bags, each weighing 2 tan (a total of 88 t/88,000 kg).

=== Urban employment and businesses ===
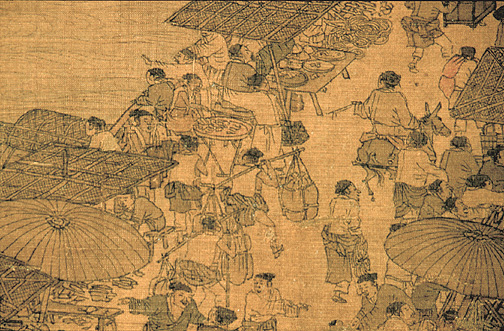
Shops and stalls with parasols and thatched roofs, lined against the riverfront, close-up detail from a long handscroll painting by Zhang Zeduan (1085–1145)

The city economy offered a new range of professions and places of work. After the fall of North China, one nostalgic writer delighted in describing each location and business in the former capital Bianjing, near present-day Kaifeng. In Dongjing Meng Hua Lu (Dreams of Splendor of the Eastern Capital) he writes of the alleys and avenues around the East Gate of the Xiangguo Temple in Kaifeng,

Along the Temple Eastgate Avenue...are to be found shops specializing in cloth caps with pointed tails, belts and waiststraps, books, caps and flowers as well as the vegetarian tea meal of the Ding family...South of the temple are the brothels of Manager's Alley...The nuns and the brocade workers live in Embroidery Alley...On the north is Small Sweetwater Alley...There are a particularly large number of Southern restaurants inside the alley, as well as a plethora of brothels.

Similarly, in the "Pleasure District" along the Horse Guild Avenue, near a Zoroastrian temple in Kaifeng, he writes:

In addition to the household gates and shops that line the two sides of New Fengqiu Gate Street...military encampments of the various brigades and columns [of the Imperial Guard] are situated in facing pairs along approximately ten li of the approach to the gate. Other wards, alleys, and confined open spaces crisscross the area, numbering in the tens of thousands—none knows their real number. In every single place, the gates are squeezed up against each other, each with its own tea wards, wineshops, stages, and food and drink. Normally the small business households of the marketplace simply purchase [prepared] food and drink at food stores; they do not cook at home. For northern food there are the Shi Feng style dried meat cubes...made of various stewed items...for southern food, the House of Jin at Temple Bridge...and the House of Zhou at Ninebends...are acknowledged to be the finest. The night markets close after the third watch only to reopen at the fifth.

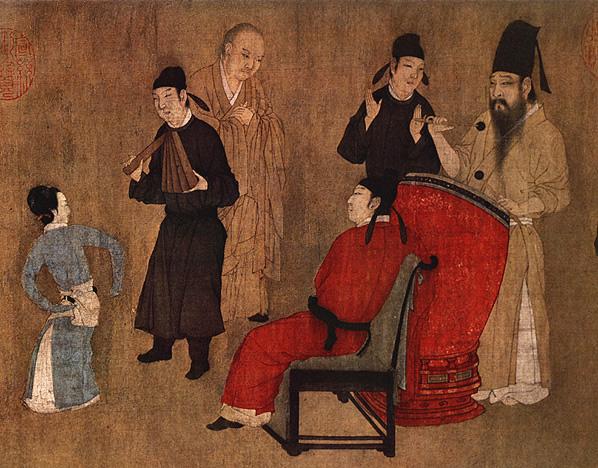
A section of the 12th century remake of Gu Hongzhong's 10th century Night Revels of Han Xizai; in this scene there are two musicians and a dancer entertaining the guests of Han Xizai.

Kaifeng shopkeepers rarely had time to eat at home, so they chose to go out and eat at a variety of places such as restaurants, temples, and food stalls. Restaurants thrived on this new clientele, while restaurants that catered to regional cooking targeted customers such as merchants and officials who came from regions of China where cuisine styles and flavors were drastically different than those commonly served in the capital. The pleasure district mentioned above—where stunts, games, theatrical stage performances, taverns and singing girl houses were located—was teeming with food stalls where business could be had virtually all night. The success of the theatre industry helped the food industry in the cities. Of the fifty some theatres within the pleasure districts of Kaifeng, four of these could entertain audiences of several thousand each, drawing huge crowds which would then give nearby businesses an enormous potential customer base. Besides food, traders in eagles and hawks, precious paintings, as well as shops selling bolts of silk and cloth, jewelry of pearls, jade, rhinoceros horn, gold and silver, hair ornaments, combs, caps, scarves, and aromatic incense thrived in the marketplaces.

=== Government monopolies and private businesses ===
The arrangement of allowing competitive industry to flourish in some regions while setting up its opposite of strict government-regulated and monopolized production and trade in others was not exclusive to iron manufacturing. In the beginning of the Song, the government supported competitive silk mills and brocade workshops in the eastern provinces and in the capital city of Kaifeng. However, at the same time the government established strict legal prohibition on the merchant trade of privately produced silk in Sichuan. This prohibition dealt an economic blow to Sichuan that caused a small rebellion (which was subdued), yet Song Sichuan was well known for its independent industries producing timber and cultivated oranges. The reforms of the chancellor Wang Anshi (1021–1086) sparked heated debate amongst ministers of court when he nationalized the industries manufacturing, processing, and distributing tea, salt, and wine. The state monopoly on Sichuan tea was the prime source of revenue for the state's purchase of horses in Qinghai for the Song army's cavalry forces. Wang's restrictions on the private manufacture and trade of salt were even criticized in a famous poem by Su Shi, and while the opposing politically charged faction at court gained advantage and lost favor, Wang Anshi's reforms were continually abandoned and reinstated. Despite this political quarrel, the Song Empire's main source of revenue continued to come from state-managed monopolies and indirect taxes. As for private entrepreneurship, great profits could still be pursued by the merchants in the luxury item trades and specialized regional production. For example, the silk producers of Raoyang County, Shenzhou in southern Hebei were especially known for producing silken headwear for the Song emperor and high court officials in the capital.

=== Foreign trade ===
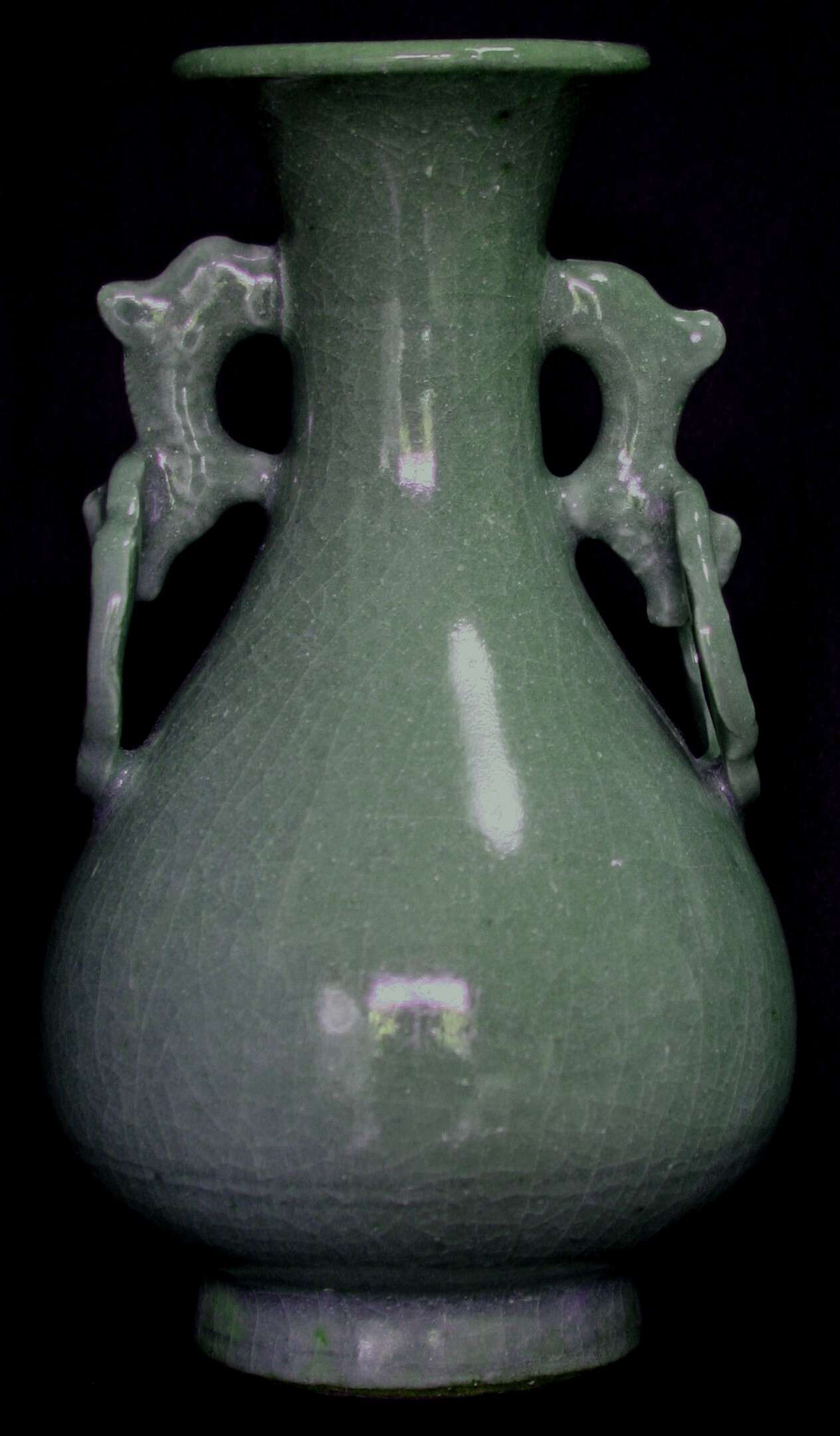
A Longquan-ware celadon vase from the 13th century.

Sea trade with regions such as the Southeast Pacific, the Hindu world, the Islamic world, and East Africa contributed significantly to the prosperity of merchants. Although the massive trade along the Grand Canal, the Yangtze River, its tributaries and lakes, and other canal systems trumped the commercial gains of overseas trade, there were still many large seaports during the Song period that bolstered the economy, such as Quanzhou, Fuzhou, Guangzhou, and Xiamen. These seaports, now connected to the hinterland via canal, lake, and river traffic, acted as a string of large market centers for the sale of cash crops produced in the interior. The high demand in China for foreign luxury goods and spices coming from the East Indies facilitated the growth of Chinese maritime trade. Along with the mining industry, the shipbuilding industry of Fujian increased its production exponentially as maritime trade was given more importance and as the province's population began to increase dramatically.

A capacious canal connected the Southern Song capital at Hangzhou to the seaport at Mingzhou (modern Ningbo), the center where many of the imported goods were shipped out to the rest of the country. Pearls, ivory, rhinoceros horns, frankincense, agalloch eaglewood, coral, agate, hawksbill turtle shell, gardenia, and rose were imported from the Arabs. Samboja and herbal medicine came from Java, while costusroot was imported from Foloan (Kuala Sungai Berang), cotton cloth and cotton yarn from Mait, and ginseng, silver, copper, and quicksilver from Korea.

Despite the installation of fire stations and a large fire fighting force, fires continued to threaten the city of Hangzhou and the various businesses within it. In safeguarding stored supplies and providing rented space for merchants and shopkeepers to keep their surplus goods safe from city fires, the rich families of Hangzhou, palace eunuchs, and empresses had large warehouses built near the northeast walls; these warehouses were surrounded by channels of water on all sides and were heavily guarded by hired night watchmen. Shipbuilders generated means of employment for many skilled craftsmen, while sailors for ship crews found many opportunities of employment as more families had enough capital to purchase boats and invest in commercial trading abroad. Foreigners and merchants from abroad affected the economy from within China as well. For example, many Muslims went to Song China not only to trade, but dominated the import and export industry and in some cases became officials of economic regulations. For Chinese maritime merchants, however, there was risk involved in such long overseas ventures to foreign trade posts and seaports as far away as Egypt. In order to reduce the risk of losing money instead of gaining it on maritime trade missions abroad, investors prudently spread their investment among several ships, each of which had a number of investors.

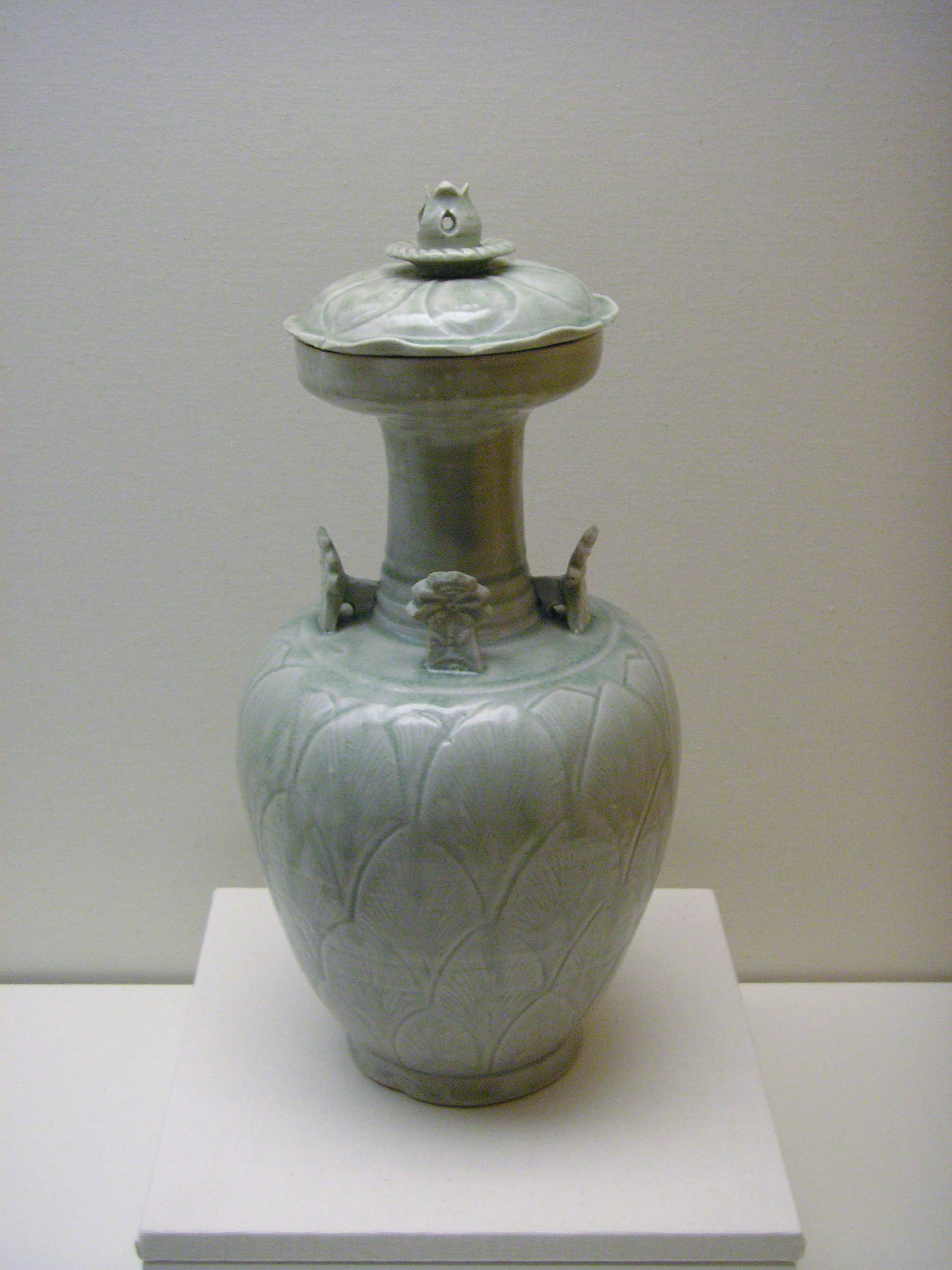
A 10th or 11th century Longquan stoneware vase from Zhejiang province, Song dynasty.

One observer thought his countrymen's investments would lead to an outflow of copper cash. He wrote, "People along the coast are on intimate terms with the merchants who engage in overseas trade, either because they are fellow-countrymen or personal acquaintances...[They give the merchants] money to take with them on their ships for purchase and return conveyance of foreign goods. They invest from ten to a hundred strings of cash, and regularly make profits of several hundred percent."

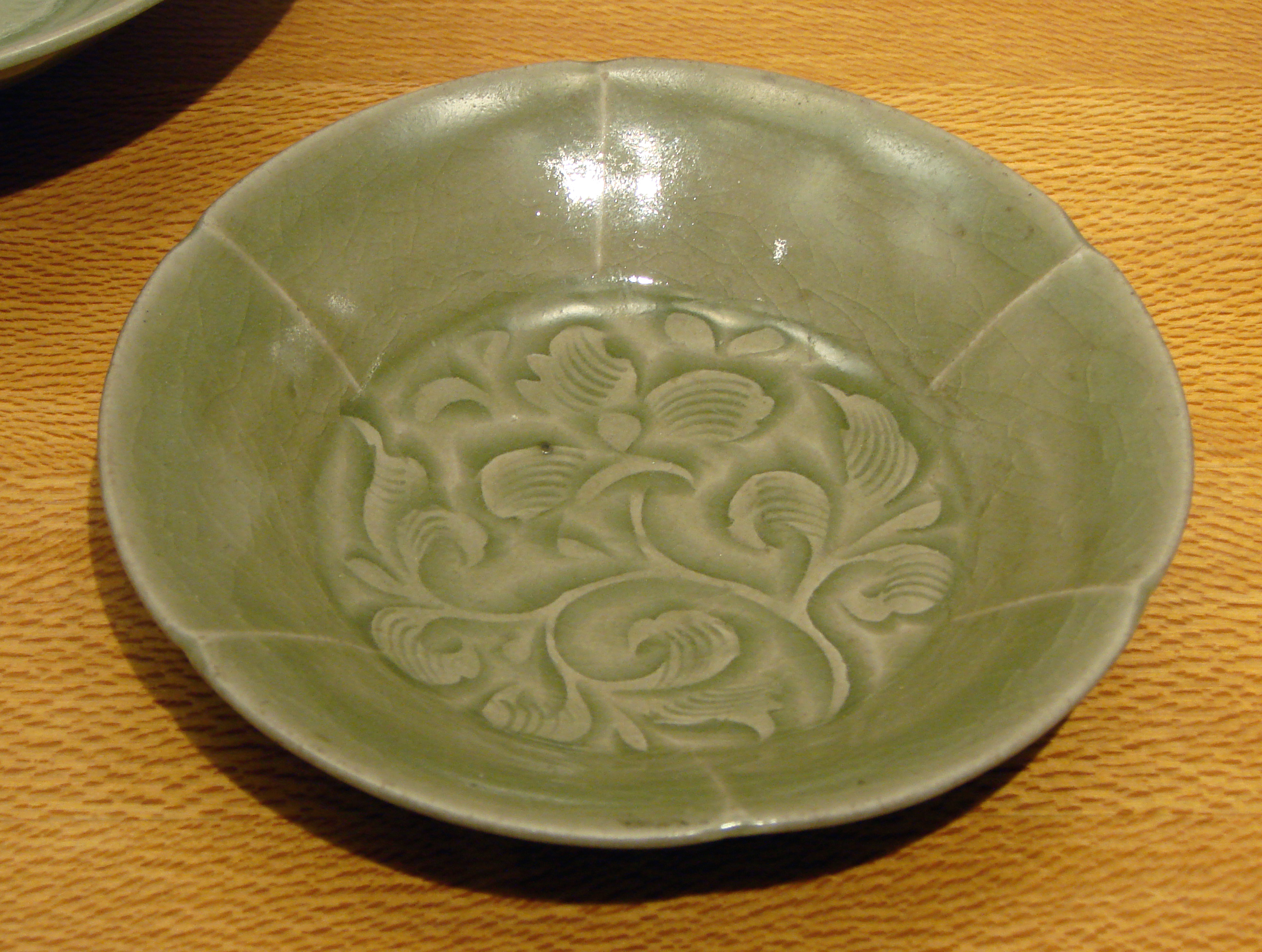
A celadon plate from Yaozhou, Shaanxi, 10th–11th century.

Zhu Yu's Pingzhou Ketan (萍洲可談; Pingzhou Table Talks) (1119) described the organization, maritime practices, and government standards of seagoing vessels, their merchants, and sailing crews:

According to government regulations concerning seagoing ships, the larger ones can carry several hundred men, and the smaller ones may have more than a hundred men on board. One of the most important merchants is chosen to be Leader (Gang Shou), another is Deputy Leader (Fu Gang Shou), and a third is Business Manager (Za Shi). The Superintendent of Merchant Shipping gives them an unofficially sealed red certificate permitting them to use the light bamboo for punishing their company when necessary. Should anyone die at sea, his property becomes forfeit to the government...The ship's pilots are acquainted with the configuration of the coasts; at night they steer by the stars, and in the day-time by the sun. In dark weather they look at the south-pointing needle (i.e. the magnetic compass). They also use a line a hundred feet long with a hook at the end which they let down to take samples of mud from the sea-bottom; by its (appearance and) smell they can determine their whereabouts.

According to a resident of Hangzhou writing in 1274, the merchant ships came in a variety of sizes. The large ones were of 5,000 liao and could fit up to 600 passengers. The middle size ones were between 1,000 and 2,000 liao and could carry up to 300 passengers. Smaller ships were known as "wind-piercing" and carried up to a hundred passengers.

Foreign travelers to China often made remarks on the economic strength of the country. The later Muslim Moroccan Berber traveler Ibn Battuta (1304–1377) wrote about many of his travel experiences in places across the Eurasian world, including China at the farthest eastern extremity. After describing lavish Chinese ships holding palatial cabins and saloons, along with the life of Chinese ship crews and captains, Batutta wrote: "Among the inhabitants of China there are those who own numerous ships, on which they send their agents to foreign places. For nowhere in the world are there to be found people richer than the Chinese".

=== Salaries and income ===
Wealthy landholders were still typically those who were able to educate their sons to the highest degree. Hence, small groups of prominent families in any given local county would gain national spotlight for having sons travel far off to be educated and appointed as ministers of the state, but downward social mobility was always an issue with the matter of divided inheritance. Suggesting ways to increase a family's property, Yuan Cai (1140–1190) wrote in the late 12th century that those who obtained office with decent salaries should not convert it to gold and silver but watch their values grow with investment:

For instance, if he had 100,000 strings worth of gold and silver and used this money to buy productive property, in a year he would gain 10,000 strings; after ten years or so, he would have regained the 100,000 strings and what would be divided among the family would be interest. If it were invested in a pawn broking business, in three years the interest would equal the capital. He would still have the 100,000 strings, and the rest, being interest, could be divided. Moreover, it could be doubled again in another three years, ad infinitum.

Shen Kuo (1031–1095), a minister of finance, was of the same opinion; in his understanding of the velocity of circulation, he stated in 1077:

The utility of money derives from circulation and loan-making. A village of ten households may have 100,000 coins. If the cash is stored in the household of one individual, even after a century, the sum remains 100,000. If the coins are circulated through business transactions so that every individual of the ten households can enjoy the utility of the 100,000 coins, then the utility will amount to that of 1,000,000 cash. If circulation continues without stop, the utility of the cash will be beyond enumeration.

Considerable scholarship has been concentrated on researching the level of living standards during the Song. A recent study by economic historian Cheng Minsheng estimated the average income for lower-class laborers during the Song dynasty as 100 wen a day, about 5 times the estimated subsistence level of 20 wen a day and a very high level for preindustrial economies. Per capita consumption of grain and silk respectively was estimated by Cheng to be around 8 jin (about 400 g each) a day and 2 bolts a year, respectively.

=== Reserve treasury ===
Emperor Taizu established a Reserve Treasury as a deposit treasury to accumulate funds with the goal of recovering the Sixteen Prefectures through direct purchase or military action.

== Handicraft industry ==
=== Porcelain ===
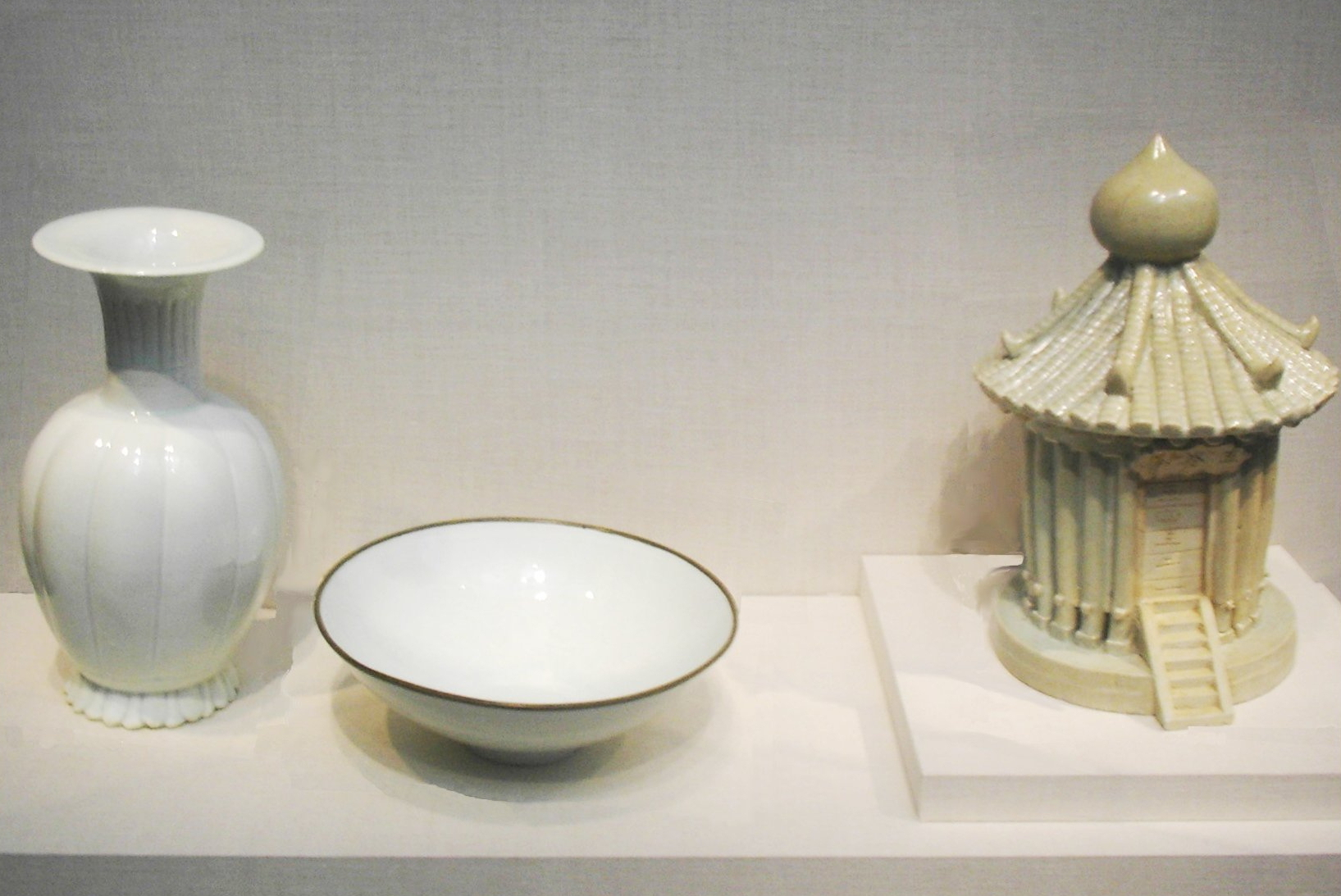
Qingbai ware from the Song dynasty

From the late Tang to early Song period, Chinese craftsmen invented true porcelain in which the glaze, pigments and vessel body were all vitrified. Regional styles of ceramics flourished in China but a style of green-white porcelain known as Qingbai ware in the southern city of Jingdezhen became the most famous. Jingdezhen during the Song period was said to have had more than 300 kilns and 12,000 skilled workers. Yonghezhen in Jizhou also emerged as a center of ceramic production in the mid-10th century and became internationally famous for its dark-glazed wares in the 12th century before being eclipsed again by Jingdezhen. Porcelain and celadon replaced silk as China's main export during the Song period and kilns sprung up along coastal ports such as Quanzhou, where a Maritime Customs Superintendency was established in 1087. The Quanzhou potters initially imitated Qingbai wares but had created their own distinctive styles by the 12th century that were popular in overseas markets such as Japan. After the Quanzhou potteries gained dominance in the export market, older centers in Guangzhou and Shaoxing declined. However few of the highest quality products from Jingdezhen, Dingzhou, and Longquan were sold abroad due to high demand in China.

=== Steel and iron industries ===
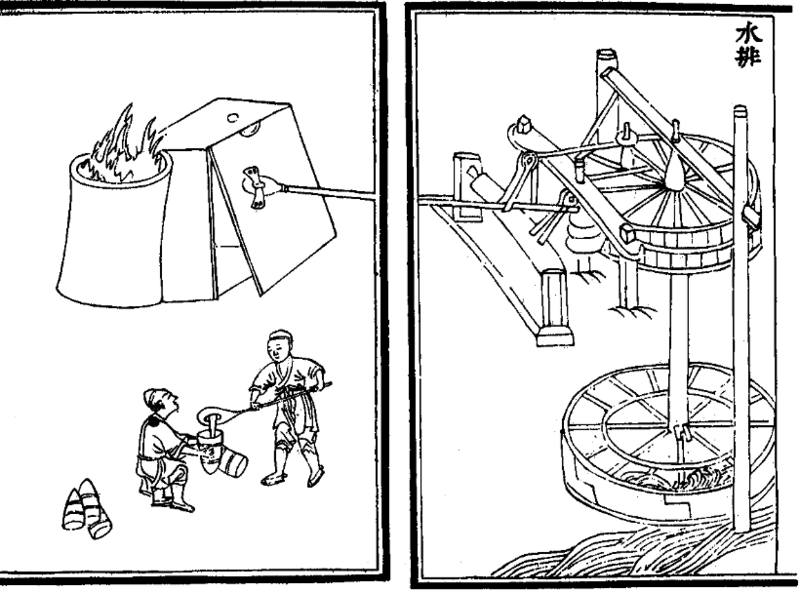
A blast furnace smelting cast iron, with bellows operated by waterwheel and mechanical device, from the Nong Shu by Wang Zhen, 1313 AD

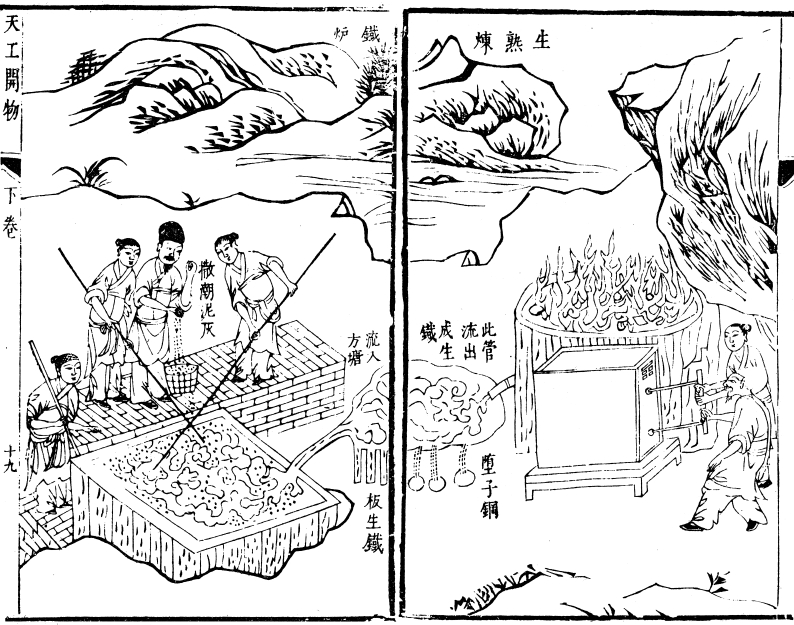
The puddling process of smelting iron ore to make wrought iron from pig iron, with the right illustration displaying men working a blast furnace, from the Tiangong Kaiwu encyclopedia, 1637.

Accompanying the widespread printing of paper money was the beginnings of what one might term an early Chinese Industrial Revolution. Historian Robert Hartwell estimates that per capita iron output rose sixfold between 806 and 1078, such that, by 1078 China was producing 127,000,000 kg (125,000 t) in weight of iron per year. However, historian Donald Wagner questions Hartwell's method used to estimate these figures (i.e. by using Song tax and quota receipts), and believes the total receipts of iron represents only a rough approximation of total government consumption of iron. Taking into account Wagner's reservations, the lowest estimates still put annual iron production levels at several times higher than the Tang dynasty.

During the era of the iron monopoly, smaller bloomery furnaces – the only iron smelting technology available in Europe before the twelfth century – seem to have disappeared entirely. Even after the Eastern Han government rescinded the iron monopoly in 88 CE iron manufacture remained confined to large-scale blast furnaces and foundries. The blast furnace technology and the economies of scale achieved by the state ironworks in the Han apparently rendered the bloomery technology economically obsolete. When small-scale ironworks reappeared in China during the Song dynasty they were operated using small blast furnaces rather than bloomery techniques.

— Richard von Glahn

In the smelting process of using huge bellows driven by waterwheels, massive amounts of charcoal were used in the production process, leading to a wide range of deforestation in northern China. However, by the end of the 11th century the Chinese discovered that using bituminous coke could replace the role of charcoal, hence many acres of forested land in northern China were spared from the steel and iron industry with this switch of resources. Iron and steel of this period were used to mass-produce ploughs, hammers, needles, pins, nails for ships, musical cymbals, chains for suspension bridges, Buddhist statues, and other routine items for an indigenous mass market. Iron was also a necessary manufacturing component for the production processes of salt and copper. Many newly constructed canals linked the major iron and steel production centers to the capital city's main market. This was also extended to trade with the outside world, which greatly expanded with the high level of Chinese maritime activity abroad during the Southern Song period.

Through many written petitions to the central government by regional administrators of the Song Empire, historical scholars pieced together an idea of the size and scope of the Chinese iron industry during the Song era. The famed magistrate Bao Qingtian (999–1062) wrote of the iron industry at Hancheng, Tongzhou Prefecture, along the Yellow River in what is today eastern Shaanxi, with iron smelting households that were overseen by government regulators. He wrote that 700 such households were acting as iron smelters, with 200 having the most adequate amount of government support, such as charcoal supplies and skilled craftsmen (the iron households hired local unskilled labor themselves). Bao's complaint to the throne was that government laws against private smelting in Shaanxi hindered profits of the industry, so the government finally heeded his plea and lifted the ban on private smelting for Shaanxi in 1055. The result of this was an increase in profit (with lower prices for iron) as well as production; 100,000 jin (60 tonnes) of iron was produced annually in Shaanxi in the 1040s AD, increasing to 600,000 jin (360 tonnes) produced annually by the 1110s, furbished by the revival of the Shaanxi mining industry in 1112. Although the iron smelters of Shaanxi were managed and supplied by the government, there were many independent smelters operated and owned by rich families. While acting as governor of Xuzhou in 1078, the famous Song poet and statesman Su Shi (1037–1101) wrote that in the Liguo Industrial Prefecture under his administered region, there were 36 iron smelters run by different local families, each employing a work force of several hundred people to mine ore, produce their own charcoal, and smelt iron. The 36 smelters produced 7,000 tons of iron and steel per year.

=== Gunpowder production ===
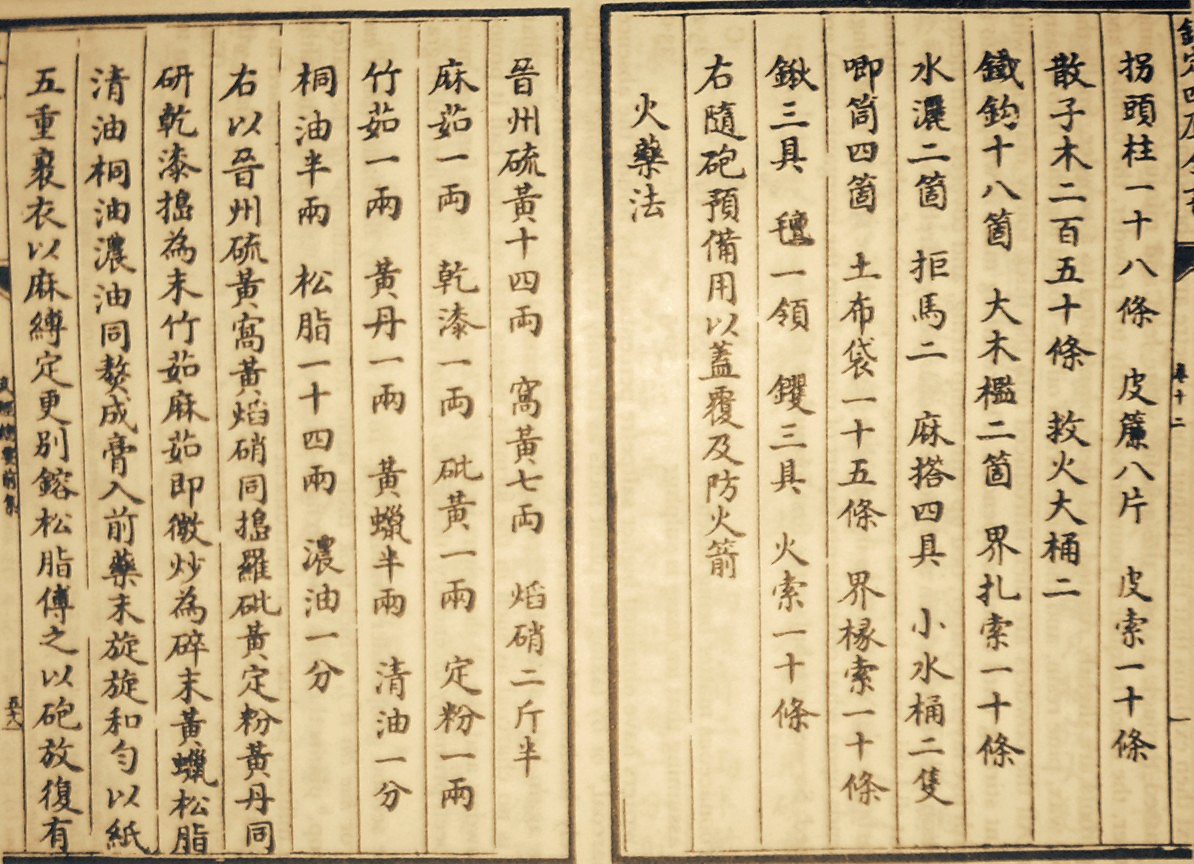
The earliest known written formula for gunpowder, from the Wujing Zongyao manuscript compiled in 1044.

During the Song period, there was a great deal of organized labor and bureaucracy involved in the extraction of resources from the various provinces in China. The production of sulfur, which the Chinese called 'vitriol liquid', was extracted from pyrite and used for pharmaceutical purposes as well as for the creation of gunpowder. This was done by roasting iron pyrites, converting the sulphide to oxide, as the ore was piled up with coal briquettes in an earthenware furnace with a type of still-head to send the sulfur over as vapour, after which it would solidify and crystallize. The historical text of the Song Shi (History of the Song, compiled in 1345 AD) stated that the major producer of sulfur in the Tang and Song dynasties was the Jin Zhou sub-provincial administrative region (modern Linfen in southern Shanxi). The bureaucrats appointed to the region managed the industrial processing and sale of it, and the amount created and distributed from the years 996 to 997 alone was 405,000 jin (roughly 200 tons). It was recorded that in 1076 AD the Song government held a strict commercial monopoly on sulfur production, and if dye houses and government workshops sold their products to private dealers in the black market, they were subject to meted penalties by government authorities. Even before this point, in 1067 AD, the Song government had issued an edict that the people living in Shanxi and Hebei were forbidden to sell foreigners any products containing saltpetre and sulfur. This act by the Song government displayed their fears of the grave potential of gunpowder weapons being developed by Song China's territorial enemies as well (i.e. the Tanguts and Khitans).

Since Jin Zhou was in close proximity to the Song capital at Kaifeng, the latter became the largest producer of gunpowder during the Northern Song period. With enhanced sulfur from pyrite instead of natural sulfur (along with enhanced potassium nitrate), the Chinese were able to shift the use of gunpowder from an incendiary use into an explosive one for early artillery. There were large manufacturing plants in the Song dynasty for the purpose of making 'fire-weapons' employing the use of gunpowder, such as fire lances and fire arrows. While engaged in a war with the Mongols, in 1259 the official Li Zengbo wrote in his Ko Zhai Za Gao, Xu Gao Hou that the city of Qingzhou was manufacturing one to two thousand strong iron-cased bomb shells a month, dispatching to Xiangyang and Yingzhou about ten to twenty thousand such bombs at a time. One of the main armories and arsenals for the storage of gunpowder and weapons was located at Weiyang, which accidentally caught fire and produced a massive explosion in 1280 AD.

== Innovations in commerce ==
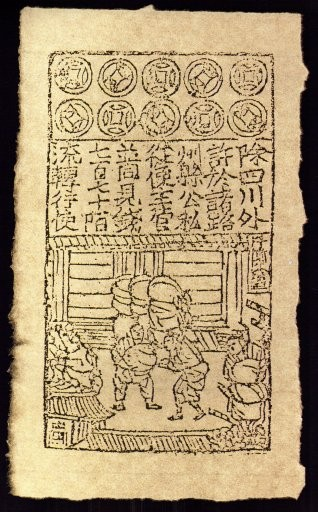
Jiaozi, the world's first paper-printed currency, an innovation of the Song dynasty.

=== Copper resources and receipts of deposit ===
The root of the development of the banknote goes back to the earlier Tang dynasty (618–907), when the government outlawed the use of bolts of silk as currency, which increased the use of copper coinage as money. By the year 1085 the output of copper currency was driven to a rate of 6 billion coins a year up from 5.86 billion in 1080 (compared to just 327 million coins minted annually in the Tang's prosperous Tianbao period of 742–755, and only 220 million coins minted annually from 118 BC to 5 AD during the Han dynasty). The expansion of the economy was unprecedented in China: the output of coinage currency in the earlier year of 997 AD, which was only 800 million coins a year. In 1120 alone, the Song government collected 18,000,000 ounces (510,000 kg) of silver in taxes.

With many 9th century Tang era merchants avoiding the weight and bulk of so many copper coins in each transaction, this led them to using trading receipts from deposit shops where goods or money were left previously. Merchants would deposit copper currency into the stores of wealthy families and prominent wholesalers, whereupon they would receive receipts that could be cashed in a number of nearby towns by accredited persons. Since the 10th century, the early Song government began issuing their own receipts of deposit, yet this was restricted mainly to their monopolized salt industry and trade. China's first official regional paper-printed money can be traced back to the year 1024, in Sichuan.

Although the output of copper currency had expanded immensely by 1085, some fifty copper mines were shut down between the years 1078 and 1085. Although there were on average more copper mines found in Northern Song China than in the previous Tang dynasty, this case was reversed during the Southern Song with a sharp decline and depletion of mined copper deposits by 1165. Even though copper cash was abundant in the late 11th century, Chancellor Wang Anshi's tax substitution for corvée labor and government takeover of agricultural finance loans meant that people now had to find additional cash, driving up the price of copper money which would become scarce. To make matters worse, large amounts of government-issued copper currency exited the country via international trade, while the Liao dynasty and Western Xia actively pursued the exchange of their iron-minted coins for Song copper coins. As evidenced by an 1103 decree, the Song government became cautious about its outflow of iron currency into the Liao Empire when it ordered that the iron was to be alloyed with tin in the smelting process, thus depriving the Liao of a chance to melt down the currency to make iron weapons.

The government attempted to prohibit the use of copper currency in border regions and in seaports, but the Song-issued copper coin became common in the Liao, Western Xia, Japanese, and Southeast Asian economies. The Song government would turn to other types of material for its currency in order to ease the demand on the government mint, including the issuing of iron coinage and paper banknotes. In the year 976, the percentage of issued currency using copper coinage was 65%; after 1135, this had dropped significantly to 54%, a government attempt to debase the copper currency.

=== The world's first paper money ===
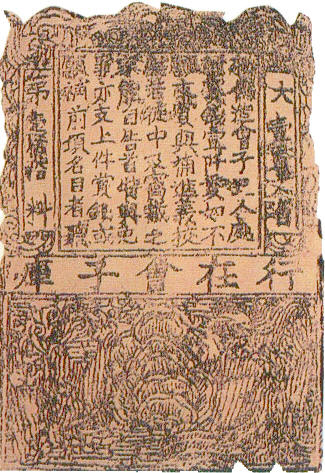
Huizi currency, issued in 1160.

The central government soon observed the economic advantages of printing paper money, issuing a monopoly right of several of the deposit shops to the issuance of these certificates of deposit. By the early 12th century, the amount of banknotes issued in a single year amounted to an annual rate of 26 million strings of cash coins. By the 1120s the central government officially stepped in and produced their own state-issued paper money (using woodblock printing). Even before this point, the Song government was amassing large amounts of paper tribute. It was recorded that each year before 1101 AD, the prefecture of Xinan (modern Xixian, Anhui) alone would send 1,500,000 sheets of paper in seven different varieties to the capital at Kaifeng. In that year of 1101, the Emperor Huizong of Song decided to lessen the amount of paper taken in the tribute quota, because it was causing detrimental effects and creating heavy burdens on the people of the region. However, the government still needed masses of paper product for the exchange certificates and the state's new issuing of paper money. For the printing of paper money alone, the Song court established several government-run factories in the cities of Huizhou, Chengdu, Hangzhou, and Anqi. The size of the workforce employed in these paper money factories were quite large, as it was recorded in 1175 AD that the factory at Hangzhou alone employed more than a thousand workers a day. However, the government issues of paper money were not yet nationwide standards of currency at that point; issues of banknotes were limited to regional zones of the empire, and were valid for use only in a designated and temporary limit of 3-year's time. The geographic limitation changed between the years 1265 and 1274, when the late Southern Song government finally produced a nationwide standard currency of paper money, once its widespread circulation was backed by gold or silver. The range of varying values for these banknotes was perhaps from one string of cash to one hundred at the most.

During the Jin–Song wars of 1214–1217, the Song paper currency depreciated significantly. It stabilized after these wars. In the midst of the Mongol wars and other financial distress, in 1265 the Song's introduced a new paper currency which severely depreciated in value.

In later dynasties, the use and enforcement of paper currency was a method undertaken by the government as a response to the counterfeiting of copper coins.

The subsequent Yuan, Ming, and Qing dynasties would issue their own paper money as well. Even the Southern Song's contemporary of the Jin dynasty to the north caught on to this trend and issued their own paper money. At the archeological dig at Rehe there was a printing plate found that dated to the year 1214, which produced notes that measured 10 cm by 19 cm in size and were worth a hundred strings of 80 cash coins. This Jurchen-Jin issued paper money bore a serial number, the number of the series, and a warning label that counterfeiters would be decapitated, and the denouncer rewarded with three hundred strings of cash.

=== Joint stock companies ===
The merchant class became more sophisticated, well-respected and organized than in earlier periods. Their wealth often rivaled that of the scholar-officials who administered the affairs of government. They innovated in several areas. They created partnerships and joint stock companies that separated owners (shareholders) from managers. Merchants in the larger cities organized into guilds that dealt in particular products and set their prices to wholesalers and shop owners. The guild heads were the representatives to the government when it requisitioned goods or assessed taxes.

The preceding Tang dynasty saw the development of heben, the earliest form of joint stock company with an active partner and passive investors. By the Song dynasty this had expanded into the douniu, a pool of shareholders with management in the hands of jingshang, merchants who operated their businesses using investors' funds. A class of merchants specialising as jingshang formed. Investor compensation was based on profit-sharing, reducing the risk of individual merchants and burdens of interest payment.

Qin Jiushao (c. 1202–1261), a mathematician and scholar, wrote an exercise that reflected the essential nature of these companies. He proposed that a partnership of four parties invested 424,000 strings of cash in a Southeast Asian trading venture. Each invested precious metals, perhaps silver, gold or commodities like salt, paper, and monk certificates (which involved a tax exemption). There was significant difference in the value of their individual investments, perhaps as much as eight times. Who was allowed to become an investor may have been influenced by social status and family connections, but each received a share of the profits in proportion to their original investment.

== See also ==
- History of economics
- History of banking in China
- Economic history of China before 1912
- Economy of the Ming dynasty
- Economy of the Qing dynasty
- Taxation in premodern China
