= Tong Dizhou =

Chinese embryologist

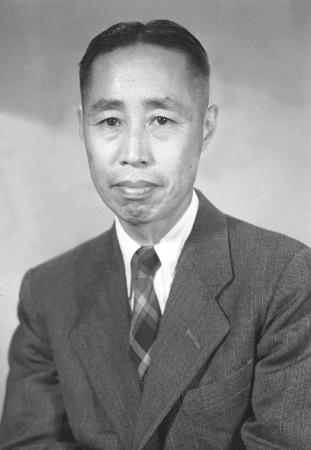
Tong Dizhou (1955)

Tong Dizhou (Chinese: 童第周; May 28, 1902 – March 30, 1979) was a Chinese embryologist known for his contributions to the field of cloning. He was a vice president of Chinese Academy of Sciences.

== Biography ==
Born in Yinxian, Zhejiang province, Tong graduated from Fudan University in 1924 with a degree in biology, and received a PhD in zoology in 1930 from Free University Brussels.

In 1963, Tong inserted DNA of a male carp into the egg of a female carp and became the first to successfully clone a fish. He is regarded as "the father of China's clone".

Tong was also an academician at the Chinese Academy of Sciences and the first director of its Institute of Oceanology from its founding in 1950 until 1978.

Tong died on 30 March 1979 at Beijing Hospital in Beijing.
