= Chiang Chao-tsung =

Chinese businessman and father of Chiang Kai-shek (1842–1895)

Chiang Chao-tsung (traditional Chinese: 蔣肇聰; simplified Chinese: 蒋肇聪; pinyin: Jiǎng Zhàocōng; nicknamed Minghuo (明火); November 10, 1842 – August 24, 1895), also known as Chiang Shu-an, was a Chinese businessman during the late Qing dynasty and the father of Chiang Kai-shek.

== Biography ==
Chiang was born in Xikou, Fenghua, Zhejiang. He had an older brother. His father, Chiang Ssu-chien was involved in the salt industry, and as a result, the family was prosperous. After his father's death in 1894, he took over the household and managed the family business, contributing to the increasing wealth of the Chiang family. He was known for being scheming, shrewd, and capable. To expand his salt shop business, he not only sold salt, rice and wine, but also other products such as vegetables, lime and more.

He died in 1895 at the age of 52, when Chiang Kai-shek was almost 8.
