= Tingxia Reservoir =

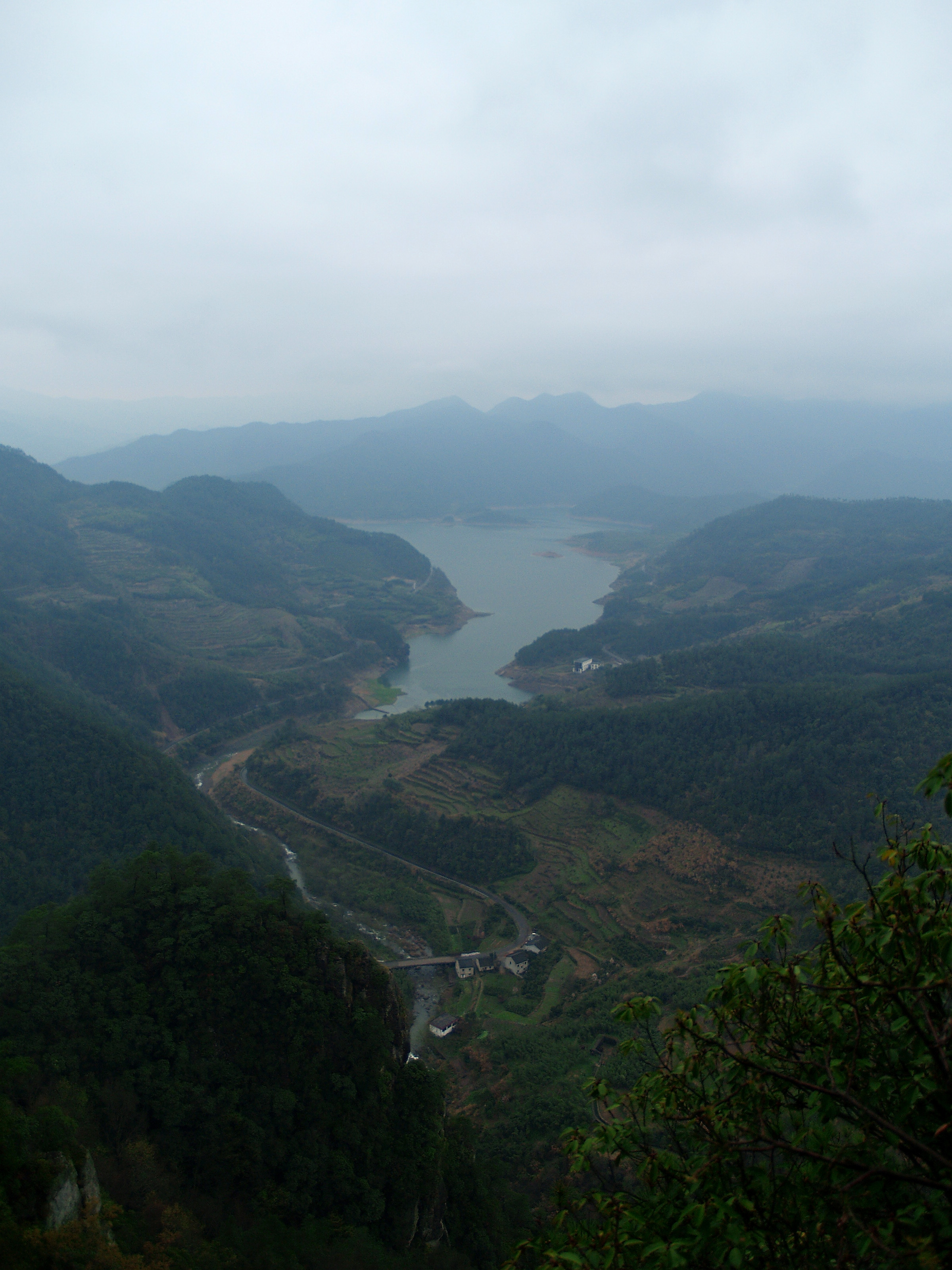
- Birdsview of Tingxia Reservoir
- Interactive map of Tingxia Reservoir
- Country: China
- Location: Xikou Town, Fenghua District, Ningbo City, Zhejiang Province
- Coordinates: 29.6558°N 121.2205°E
- Purpose: flood control and irrigation
- Construction began: 1978

Tingxia Reservoir (simplified Chinese: 亭下水库; traditional Chinese: 亭下水庫; pinyin: Tíngxià shuǐkù), also known as Tingxia Lake, is a reservoir in Xikou Town, Fenghua District, Ningbo City, Zhejiang Province, China, located on the Shanjiang River, a tributary of Fenghua River. It is a large (2) scale water conservancy hub project mainly for flood control and irrigation, combined with power generation and water supply.

The construction of Tingxia Reservoir started in 1978 and was completed in 1985, with a storage capacity of 153 million cubic meters. It is the largest reservoir in Ningbo.

Ningbo's freshwater resources include the Yong River, Yao River, and Fenghua River, all of which contribute to the Tingxia Reservoir as well as other water supplies. It can provide an average of 126 million m^{3} of premium water to urban areas.
