= Malongkeng =

Religious site in Zhejiang, China

Malongkeng (马龙坑; also Malukeng 马陆坑, 马鹿坑) is a religious site located south of Yuanjia'ao, China, dedicated to the Zhouji Dragon King. The site is revered by villagers of the surrounding hills and the greater Fenghua area for its spring waters. Donations are periodically made to Xianling Temple (显灵庙), which guards the site.

== Geography and landmarks ==
The site is known locally as the "Zhouji Tan Scenic Area". The area features a bamboo forest at an elevation of approximately 350 meters (1,150 ft). Water in the Zhouji Tan pool (also known as the Malongkeng Dragon Pool; 马龙坑龙潭) and its waterfalls originates from mountain springs and flows down from Malongkeng to the foot of the mountain, where it merges into the West River (Xijiang), which rises from Xujiashan (许家山). The pool is listed as one of the "Five Great Pools" of Dalei Mountain, one of Ningbo's top ten famous mountains.

According to a 2016 news article, Malongkeng had undergone multiple rounds of development during the past two decades. The Malongkeng Ancient Trail is a hiking route connecting the site with the nearby Yuanjia'ao Village. Major structures along the trail include the Qilong Pavilion (祁龙亭), a stone resting pavilion funded by local residents, and the Zhouji Temple, which was also built through community fundraising.

== Legends ==
According to local legend, nine dragons once lived in Jiulong Village (Nine Dragon Village), located at the foot of Dalei Mountain (大雷山) in Shangtian, Fenghua. The dragons were believed to cause harm rather than benefit the local population. During a severe summer drought, they allegedly consumed all the water from Gaohu Holy Water (High Lake), depriving villagers of water for household use and agricultural irrigation. Unable to control them, the Mountain God of Dalei Mountain (大雷山神) petitioned the Jade Emperor, who punished the dragons by banishing them to different areas and commanding them to protect local communities and perform good deeds in perpetuity. The third dragon, known as Long Laosan, was assigned to Malongkeng.

According to tradition, the Dragon King went to the aid of imperial troops in the Ming Dynasty and was honored by the Jiajing Emperor by edict. From that time onwards, pilgrims from around Fenghua have made their way to Malongkeng to ask favors of the Dragon King.

== Folk festival ==
A colorful folk religious festival is held annually at Malongkeng on the 18th day of the sixth lunar month, which is said to be the birthday of the Zhouji Dragon King. At that time tens of thousands of people make the trip to Malongkeng, and roads up the mountain become extremely congested.

In July 2004, the Fenghua municipal government banned the festival, citing danger from fire in the surrounding forest. Authorities described the festival as "superstition" and said measures taken against it would promote civilization and social stability. In late July traffic to Malongkeng was not allowed to proceed, and the Xianling Temple was temporarily closed down.
