= Yuanjia'ao =

Village in Fenghua, Zhejiang, China

Yuanjia'ao (袁家嶴) is a village in Fenghua municipality, Zhejiang province, China. Situated at approx. 280m above sea level in the Tiantai Mountain range, its main products are bamboo and timber. The village is traditionally considered the ancestral home of the Yuans of the greater Ningbo, who have been estimated to number some 20,000.

The village itself is split in two by the Tangqi River, a small stream which can flood in the autumn months. Yuanjia'ao is famous in Fenghua because it is a thoroughfare to Malongkeng, a religious site near the peak of Mount Dalei. There is a narrow concrete road to Yuanjia'ao from Xiaowangmiao in the north, which follows the Tangqi River all the way to Xujiashan in the south. On the 18th day of the sixth lunar month, when the religious festival to honour the dragon king of Malongkeng is held, the road becomes heavily congested.

Of the 400 families of Yuanjia'ao, over 90% are surnamed Yuan. According to the Yuanshi jiapu of 1923, all the Yuans of the village are descended from a certain Yuan Rong (袁蓉), who moved from Xinchang county and settled at the site in the tenth century. The village also has wider significance as the ancestral home of the Yuan clans of Ningbo and its hinterlands. Efforts have been made in recent years to revive and restore the clan monuments and religious buildings which were destroyed during the Cultural Revolution. In 1997, a clan hall was reopened, and the Duling Temple and its connected memorial arch was erected. Since 2001, clan members have been studying the last remaining copy of the clan genealogy held by the Fenghua government and liaising with members of the Cilin Yuan clan to republish the genealogy.
