= Chiang Ssu-chien =

Chinese businessman and grandfather of Chiang Kai-shek (1814–1894)

Chiang Ssu-chien (traditional Chinese: 蔣斯千; simplified Chinese: 蒋斯千; pinyin: Jiǎng Sīqiān; 31 December 1814 - 21 November 1894) was a Chinese businessman during the Qing dynasty and the grandfather of former Republic of China President Chiang Kai-shek.

== Biography ==
Chiang Ssu-chien was born on 31 December 1814 (20 November of the 19th year of the Jiaqing Emperor) to Chiang Chi-tseng (蔣祈增). His early years were spent as a farmer and later years were spent in Xikou, Fenghua in Zhejiang in a village named Jinxi (錦溪村) managing the Yutai salt store as well as making and selling wine. His business became more successful later on and improved the Chiang family's social status. He raised two children. His older son was Chiang Chao-hai (蔣肇海) and his younger son, Chiang Chao-tsung was Chiang Kai-shek's father, and inherited the family business after his father's death. Chiang Ssu-chien died on 21 November 1894 (24 October of the 20th year of the Guangxu Emperor).
