= Yuan Taotu =

Chinese Spring and Autumn period nobleman

Yuan Taotu (轅濤塗; died c. 625 BC, posthumous title 宣仲; Xuanzhong) was a nobleman and diplomat of the Spring and Autumn state of Chen. He is regarded as the ancestor of those surnamed Yuan (袁).

Yuan Taotu was a distant relative of the Chen royal family, with a fief at Yangxia (Taikang, Henan province). He is mentioned in passing in the Spring and Autumn Annals, Zuo Zhuan and Historical Records. In 656 BC, he accompanied Duke Huan of Qi on an expedition against the southern state of Cai and was present at the historic covenant of alliance between the various states of the Yellow River valley at Shaoling. On the return journey to the north, however, he suggested that the army of Qi pass by Chen and take a detour to the eastern regions. For this advice he was arrested and only released after an abortive invasion of Chen ended the next year.

The state of Chen supported the neighbouring state of Chu at the Battle of Chengpu in 632 BC, and was defeated. The next year, Yuan Taotu was sent as representative of Chen to Diquan, to renew the state's allegiance to the King of Zhou and to consult about an invasion of Zheng. In the winter of that same year, the Chen heir-apparent met with other princes, witnessing the investiture of the Duke of Jin as hegemon. Yuan probably died shortly thereafter.
