= Xiaowangmiao Subdistrict =

Xiaowangmiao Subdistrict 萧王庙街道
- Subdistrict
- Location within Zhejiang
- Coordinates: 29.42154°N 121.21107°E
- Country: China
- Provinces of China: Zhejiang
- Prefecture-level city: Ningbo
- District: Fenghua District

Xiaowangmiao Subdistrict (simplified Chinese: 萧王庙街道; traditional Chinese: 蕭王廟街道; pinyin: Xiāowángmiào Jiēdào) is a subdistrict in Fenghua District, Ningbo, Zhejiang province, China. It lies on the south bank of the Shan River, and takes its name from the Temple of King Xiao. The subdistrict includes the village of Yuanjia'ao.

== Administrative divisions ==
Xiaowangmiao Subdistrict is divided into 1 residential community and 21 administrative villages.

- Xiaowangmiao Community (Chinese: 萧王庙社区)
- Yuanjia'ao Village (Chinese: 袁家岙村)
- Cilin Village (Chinese: 慈林村)
- Linjia Village (Chinese: 林家村)
- Qiange Village (Chinese: 前葛村)
- Qingyun Village (Chinese: 青云村)
- Chenjia'ao Village (Chinese: 陈家岙村)
- Fujia'ao Village (Chinese: 傅家岙村)
- Tengtou Village (Chinese: 滕头村)
- Xiaoqiaotou Village (Chinese: 肖桥头村)
- Tangwan Village (Chinese: 塘湾村)
- Chenlangdai Village (Chinese: 陈郎埭村)
- Dabu Village (Chinese: 大埠村)
- Tang'ao Village (Chinese: 棠岙村)
- Yunxi Village (Chinese: 云溪村)
- Heying Village (Chinese: 何应村)
- Yunji Village (Chinese: 云集村)
- Paiting Village (Chinese: 牌亭村)
- Lingfeng Village (Chinese: 岭丰村)
- Wuxing Village (Chinese: 五星村)
- Panqian Village (Chinese: 潘前村)
- Houzhu Village (Chinese: 后竺村)
