= Yuen Mo =

Yuen Mo (Chinese: 袁武; pinyin: Yuán Wǔ) GBS JP (born November 1941) is a business leader in Hong Kong.

Yuen joined China Merchants, a shipping company, in 1964, and served in various positions such as Deputy General Manager of Hong Kong Ming Wah Shipping Co. Ltd., Deputy General Manager of China Merchants Steam Navigation Co. Ltd.

Yuen was also a member of the 8th Chinese People's Political Consultative Conference, a Member of the Preparatory Committee of the Hong Kong Special Administrative Region, a member of the Provisional Legislative Council of Hong Kong, and a member of the first Election Committee to elect 10 of the 60 seats of the Legislative Council in 1998.

At present, he is concurrently serving as Chairman of China Merchants Industry Holdings and Vice Chairman of China Merchants Zhangzhou Economic Development Zone. Yuen is Deputy to the Ninth National People's Congress and conveyor of deputies from Hong Kong, a Justice of the Peace, a Member of the Election Committee, Member of the Citizens Advisory Committee on Community Relations of ICAC, and Executive Director of the Hong Kong Chinese Enterprises Association.

Yuen traces his ancestry to the Yuan clan of Dongguan and has ties with the Hong Kong Association of Yuan Clansmen (simplified Chinese: 香港袁氏宗亲会; traditional Chinese: 香港袁氏宗親會; pinyin: Xiāng Gǎng Yuán shì zōngqīn huì). In 2001, he led a group of Hong Kong and Shenzhen-based Yuan clan businessmen to Ru'nan, where they attended local cultural events and discussed with provincial officials the possibility of investing in the local industry.

Legislative Council of Hong Kong
New parliament	Member of Provisional Legislative Council; 1997–1998	Replaced by Legislative Council
Order of precedence
Preceded by Michael Sze; Recipients of the Gold Bauhinia Star	Hong Kong order of precedence Recipients of the Gold Bauhinia Star	Succeeded by George Choa; Recipients of the Gold Bauhinia Star
