= Yuan Shansong =

- Chinese: 袁山松
Transcriptions
Standard Mandarin
- Hanyu Pinyin: Yuán Shānsōng
- Wade–Giles: Yüan Shan-sung

Yuan Song
- Chinese: 袁崧
Transcriptions
Standard Mandarin
- Hanyu Pinyin: Yuán Sōng
- Wade–Giles: Yüan Sung

Alternative Chinese name
- Chinese: 袁嵩
Transcriptions
Standard Mandarin
- Hanyu Pinyin: Yuán Sōng
- Wade–Giles: Yüan Sung

Yuan Shansong, sometimes called Yuan Song, (344 – 401 CE) was an official of the Jin Dynasty. He was known as an accomplished poet, lyricist, and also as an historian. Yuan also produced one of the first landscape essays, later to become a popular form in Chinese literature. He composed the Treatise on Administrative Geography (郡国志; 郡國志; Jùnguózhì). Much of his work has survived to the present day. Later, Yuan was given appointment as the Grand Administrator of Wu Commandery. During the rebellion of Sun En in 399, he died defending Hudu in the western suburbs of modern Shanghai.
