= Yuan Renlin =

Chinese linguist

Yuan Renlin (Chinese: 袁仁林), styled Zhenqian (振千), was a Qing dynasty linguist. He was from Sanyuan county, Shaanxi province, and lived in the early 18th century.

Yuan is best known for his work Xu zi shuo (虚字说), a 68–page study of grammatical particles. The work is full of careful and original observations on the grammatical functions of both individual grammatical particles and combinations of these. The attention Yuan Renlin paid to combinations of grammatical particles is remarkable for its time. Yuan had a profound influence on the authors of the first proper grammar of Literary Chinese, Ma Jianzhong and his brother Ma Xiangbo.
