= Yinxian =

Yinxian 隐贤镇
- Town
- Interactive map of Yinxian
- Coordinates: 32°08′17″N 116°32′12″E
- Country: People's Republic of China
- Province: Anhui
- Prefecture-level city: Lu'an
- County: Shou
- Time zone: UTC+8 (China Standard)

Yinxian (simplified Chinese: 隐贤; traditional Chinese: 隱賢; pinyin: Yǐnxián) is a town of Shou County in central Anhui province, China. It has 2 residential communities (社区) and 8 villages under its administration.
