= Yuan Cai =

Yuan Cai (袁采 pinyin: Yuán Cǎi, c. 1140–1195) was a Chinese essayist and politician during the Song dynasty, best known for penning the Yuan shi shi fan (Precepts for Social Life), a manual of advice addressed to family heads on the subject of how to handle their responsibilities.

Yuan was born in Xin'an, the capital of Quzhou prefecture, to an established gentry family. In the 1150s he was a student at the National University (大学) at the Southern Song capital of Hangzhou. After passing the jinshi degree in 1163, Yuan Cai served in several prefectures outside the capital. Altogether Yuan Cai served as magistrate of four counties.

During this time, he spent much of his time writing. Two of his early works, Zhenghe za ji ("Mischellaneous Notes from Zhenghe) and Xianling xiao lu ("Minor Records of Magistrates"), are no longer extant. From the bibliography chapter of the Book of Song and Ming dynasty gazetteers of Quzhou, he is also known to have written a number of other books, all of which are also lost. Most of them were concerned with the administration of local and central government. At least one detailed ways in which the central government could improve its capacity to fend off the Jurchens who had seized north China in the Jin–Song wars.

Serving as magistrate of Yueqing from 1178 onwards, Yuan acted as compiler of a ten-chapter gazetteer of the county. He probably completed and published the Yuan shi shi fan around this time. Liu Zhen, one of the members of the local families, whom Yuan had met at the National University, wrote the preface for Yuan's work. The Yuan shi shi fan was reprinted in 1190, whilst Yuan Cai was at Wuyuan in what is now southern Anhui.

In 1192 he was recommended for promotion by the poet Yang Wanli. Yuan Cai's last post was in the capital, as director of the Public Attention Drum Bureau. He probably died sometime in the mid-1190s. After his death, his second son and a cousin also attained the jinshi degree in 1205.
