= Fenghua, Ningbo =

Fenghua 奉化区 Fenghwa
- District
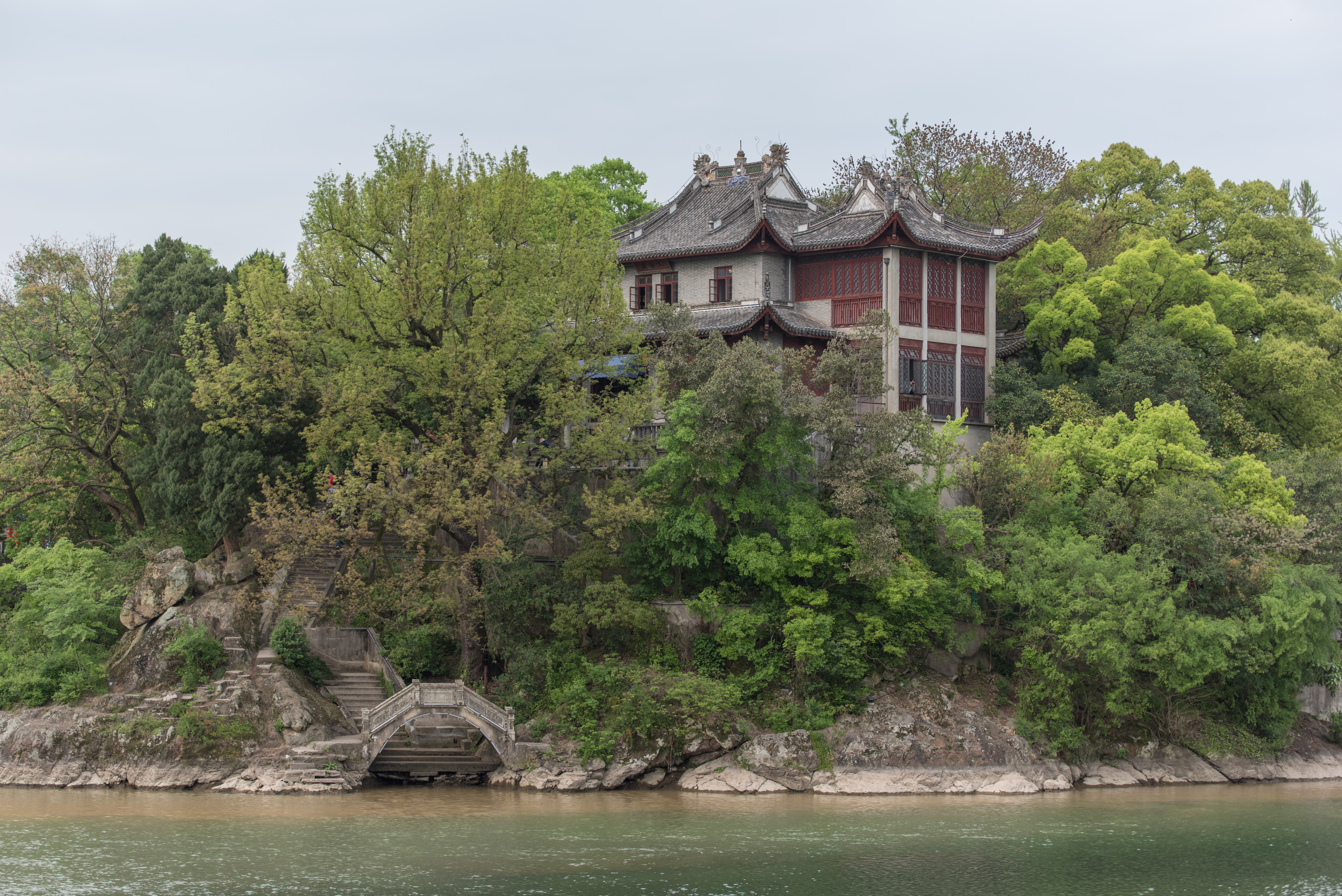
- Wenchang Pavilion in Xikou

- Fenghua in Ningbo

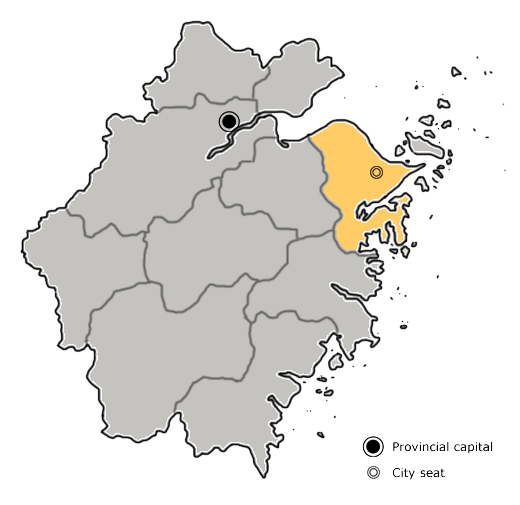
- Ningbo in Zhejiang
- Coordinates: 29°39′N 121°25′E
- Country: People's Republic of China
- Province: Zhejiang
- Sub-provincial city: Ningbo
- Township-level divisions: 12 (6 towns, 6 townships)

Government
  - Mayor: Gao Haomeng

Area
  - Total: 1,249 km^{2} (482 sq mi)

Population
  - Total: 490,000
  - Density: 390/km^{2} (1,000/sq mi)
- Time zone: UTC+8 (China Standard)
- Postal code: 315500
- Area code: 0574
- Website: www.FH.gov.cn

Fenghua, Ningbo
- Chinese: 奉化
- Postal: Fenghwa
Transcriptions
Standard Mandarin
- Hanyu Pinyin: Fènghuà
- Wade–Giles: Feng^{4}-hua^{4}

Fenghua (Fenghua; Chinese: 奉化; pinyin: Fènghuà; Wu: Von-ho) is a district of the city of Ningbo, Zhejiang Province, China. The district and its administrative hinterlands have a population of over 480,000.

Fenghua is the hometown of two former presidents of the Republic of China, Chiang Kai-shek and Chiang Ching-kuo. Geographically, it is dominated by the Tiantai and Siming mountain ranges.

== Administrative divisions ==
Fenghua District administrative divisions map

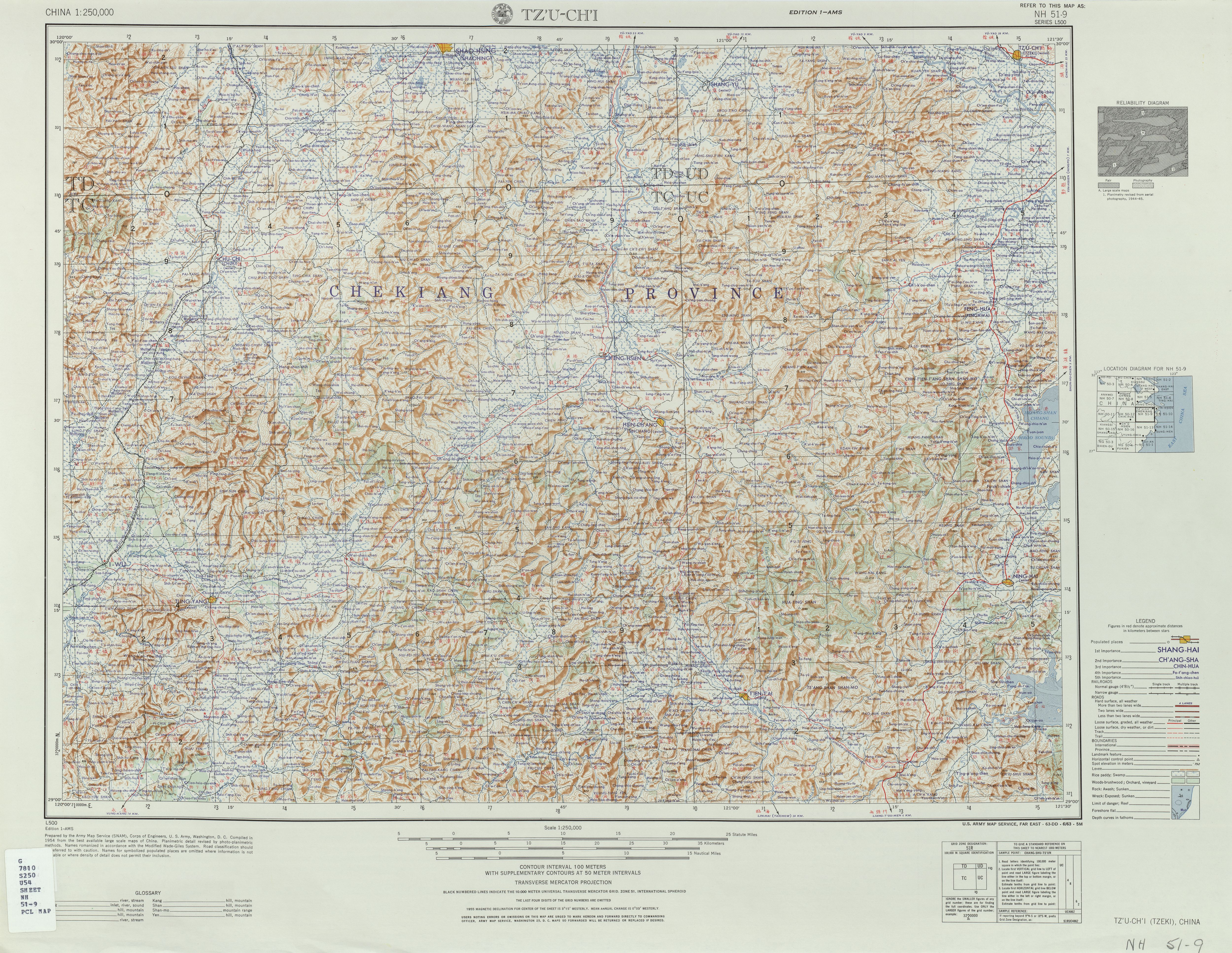
Map including Fenghua (labeled as FENG-HUA (FENGHWA) 奉化) (1954)

Fenghua has 6 subdistricts and 6 towns.

Six subdistricts:

- Jinping (锦屏街道)
- Yuelin (岳林街道)
- Jiangkou (Chiang-k’ou-chen; 江口街道, formerly 江口鎮)
- Xiwu (Hsi-wu-chen; 西坞街道, formerly 西塢鎮)
- Xiaowangmiao (Hsiao-wang-miao-shih; 萧王庙街道, formerly 蕭王庙市)
- Fangqiao (Fang-ch’iao-chen; 方桥街道), established in January 2019

Six towns:

- Xikou (Ch’i-k’ou-chen, 溪口镇/溪口鎮)
- Chunhu (Shun-hu-chen; 莼湖镇/蓴湖鎮)
- Shangtian (尚田镇)
- Dayan (大堰镇)
- Qiucun (裘村镇)
- Song'ao/Song Ao (Sung-ao-shih; 松岙镇)

== Climate ==
Climate data for Fenghua, elevation 42 m (138 ft), (1991–2020 normals, extremes 1981–present)
Month	Jan	Feb	Mar	Apr	May	Jun	Jul	Aug	Sep	Oct	Nov	Dec	Year
Record high °C (°F)	27.0 (80.6)	31.0 (87.8)	33.6 (92.5)	36.1 (97.0)	37.6 (99.7)	38.3 (100.9)	42.7 (108.9)	43.5 (110.3)	38.1 (100.6)	36.7 (98.1)	30.3 (86.5)	26.1 (79.0)	43.5 (110.3)
Mean daily maximum °C (°F)	9.8 (49.6)	11.9 (53.4)	15.9 (60.6)	21.8 (71.2)	26.3 (79.3)	28.9 (84.0)	33.6 (92.5)	33.0 (91.4)	28.6 (83.5)	24.0 (75.2)	18.6 (65.5)	12.5 (54.5)	22.1 (71.7)
Daily mean °C (°F)	5.6 (42.1)	7.3 (45.1)	11.0 (51.8)	16.4 (61.5)	21.2 (70.2)	24.6 (76.3)	28.7 (83.7)	28.2 (82.8)	24.2 (75.6)	19.1 (66.4)	13.7 (56.7)	7.7 (45.9)	17.3 (63.2)
Mean daily minimum °C (°F)	2.3 (36.1)	3.8 (38.8)	7.2 (45.0)	12.3 (54.1)	17.3 (63.1)	21.4 (70.5)	25.2 (77.4)	24.9 (76.8)	21.0 (69.8)	15.3 (59.5)	9.8 (49.6)	4.0 (39.2)	13.7 (56.7)
Record low °C (°F)	−7.7 (18.1)	−5.7 (21.7)	−4.6 (23.7)	−1.1 (30.0)	7.6 (45.7)	12.4 (54.3)	18.2 (64.8)	18.0 (64.4)	11.2 (52.2)	0.8 (33.4)	−3.6 (25.5)	−8.3 (17.1)	−8.3 (17.1)
Average precipitation mm (inches)	79.7 (3.14)	75.0 (2.95)	123.8 (4.87)	104.6 (4.12)	122.1 (4.81)	225.9 (8.89)	154.9 (6.10)	204.9 (8.07)	188.9 (7.44)	90.2 (3.55)	74.4 (2.93)	64.1 (2.52)	1,508.5 (59.39)
Average precipitation days (≥ 0.1 mm)	12.5	11.9	15.4	14.4	14.6	16.6	12.8	16.4	13.9	9.1	10.6	10.0	158.2
Average snowy days	2.7	1.9	0.7	0	0	0	0	0	0	0	0	1.0	6.3
Average relative humidity (%)	76	75	75	73	76	83	78	80	82	78	78	75	77
Mean monthly sunshine hours	109.8	107.4	127.6	152.4	160.4	126.2	229.1	207.5	149.6	153.2	120.2	124.1	1,767.5
Percentage possible sunshine	34	34	34	39	38	30	54	51	41	44	38	39	40
Source: China Meteorological Administration All-time September high All-time October high all-time extreme temperature
