= Witman Hung =

Hong Kong politician

Witman Hung JP
- 洪為民
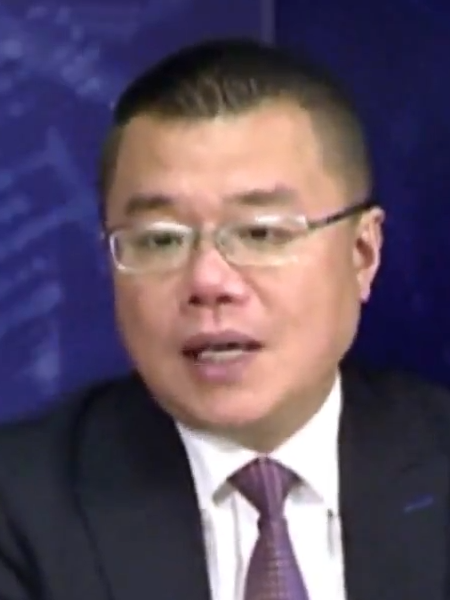
- Hung in 2017

Hong Kong Deputy to the National People's Congress
- Incumbent
- Assumed office 19 December 2017 Serving with 35 other deputies

Personal details
- Born: Hong Weimin; 3 January 1969 (age 57) Shanghai, China
- Education: University of Bolton (BA); University of Hull (MBA); Chinese University of Hong Kong (MA); Renmin University (LLM, LLD); Bulacan State University (PhD)

Witman Hung Wai-man, JP (Chinese: 洪為民; born 3 January 1969) is a Hong Kong investor and politician, who is the Principal Liaison Officer for Hong Kong of the Shenzhen Qianhai Authority and independent non-executive director in four companies listed in the Hong Kong Stock Exchange. He is also one of the Hong Kong deputies to the National People's Congress and a member of Shenzhen's Chinese People's Political Consultative Conference.

== Controversies ==
On 5 January 2022, Carrie Lam announced new warnings and restrictions against social gatherings due to a potential new round of COVID-19 outbreak. One day later, it was discovered that Hung's 53rd birthday party hosted 222 guests. At least one guest was tested positive with COVID-19, therefore many attendees had to be quarantined, including several principal officials of Hong Kong.
