= Coronavirus in Hong Kong =

Hong Kong coronavirus may refer to:

- 2002–2004 SARS outbreak, coronavirus outbreak which affected Hong Kong in 2003
- COVID-19 pandemic in Hong Kong, coronavirus outbreak which affected Hong Kong from 2020
