= Tsuen Wan Government Secondary School =

Government school in Tsuen Wan, Hong Kong

Coordinates: 22.3726°N 114.1138°E

- 荃灣官立中學

Location
- 70 Hoi Pa Street, Tsuen Wan; Hong Kong

Information
- Type: Government School; EMI school
- Motto: Integritas 誠正達仁
- Established: 11 September 1961; 65 years ago
- School district: Tsuen Wan District
- Medium of instruction: English (EMI)
- Principal: Ms. TANG Suk-ching
- Grades: Secondary 1 to 6
- Enrolment: 1,000（2013–2014）
- Classes: 24 classes(S.1-S.6:Each grade has 4 classes, Class A of S.1-S.3 are Elite classes, class B, C, D are Mixed-ability classes. Chinese Language, English Language and Mathematics grouped separately according to their scores in each subject.
- Average class size: 36
- Houses: ■ Bamboo (竹) ■ Camphor (樟) ■ Pine (松) ■ Plum (梅)
- Colour: Green
- Website: https://www.twgss.edu.hk/

Tsuen Wan Government Secondary School
- Traditional Chinese: 荃灣官立中學
- Simplified Chinese: 荃湾官立中学
Transcriptions
Standard Mandarin
- Hanyu Pinyin: Quánwān Guān lì Zhōngxué
Yue: Cantonese
- Jyutping: cyun4 waan1 gun1 laap6 zung1 hok6

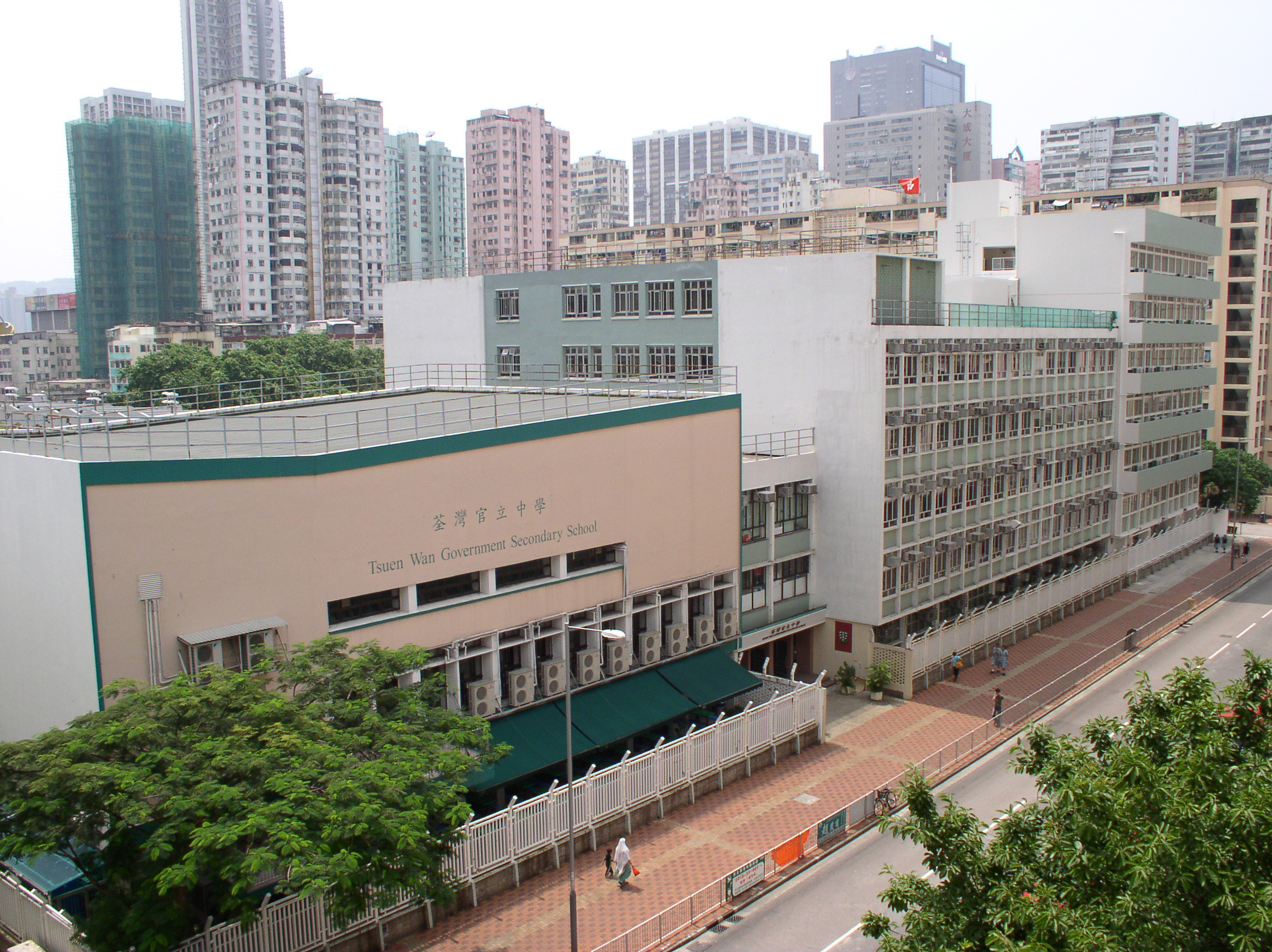
A photo of the School taken from the opposite side of Hoi Pa Street, showing (from left to right) the hall, the main entrance, the laboratory wing and the new wing. The classroom wing is obscured by the laboratory wing

Tsuen Wan Government Secondary School (TWGSS; Chinese: 荃灣官立中學 or 荃官 in short) is an EMI co-education secondary school located at 70 Hoi Pa Street, Tsuen Wan, Hong Kong. The school building consists of the hall, the laboratory wing, the classroom wing, and the new wing (completed in 2003). Ms. Tang Suk Ching is the current principal of the school, beginning her term in September 2016.

== History ==
- The school was founded in 1961, as the earliest secondary school in the Tsuen Wan District. Today it is recognised as one of the leading schools in Hong Kong in terms of academic results.
- TWGSS opened on 11 September 1961. The first campus site was in the newly established Hoi Pa Street Government Primary School, where 68 boys and 75 girls were accommodated temporarily. In September 1963, however, due to the lack of classrooms available for S1-S3 levels, the school was separated into A.M. and P. M. sessions. On 25 June 1964, students moved to the new campus and the whole-day school arrangement resumed.
- The opening ceremony of TWGSS was held on 25 November 1964. The Governor of Hong Kong David Trench was invited to be the Guest of Honour to mark the opening of the school. A historical plaque of the grand opening ceremony can be found on the wall of the main lobby. The plague reads, 'THIS SCHOOL WAS OPENED BY HIS EXCELLENCY THE GOVERNOR SIR DAVID C.C. TRENCH K.C. M.G., M.C. ON 25TH NOVEMBER 1964.'
- Two survivors of the 2010 Manila hostage crisis, who were orphaned by the tragedy, were students of the school.

== Academic results ==
Historically, more students at the school have received 10 A grades on the Hong Kong Certificate of Education Examination (HKCEE) (the highest grade possible on the HKCEE) than at any other secondary schools in Hong Kong. Out of over 572 secondary schools in Hong Kong, fewer than 30 have ever produced these so-called "10A" students. In particular, between 2000 and 2010, eight Tsuen Wan Government Secondary School students have received 10 A's in the Hong Kong Certificate of Education Examination (HKCEE) and 14 students have received 9 A's, ranking ninth among all secondary schools in Hong Kong.

In the Hong Kong Advanced Level Examination (HKALE), more than 30 students have received 5 A's, 4 A's or 3 A's between 2000 and 2010. The school received a relatively high number of A grades and A-C grades per student.

TWGSS counts a total of 12 winners of the Hong Kong Outstanding Students Awards, ranking seventh among all secondary schools in Hong Kong.

== School facilities ==
31 air-conditioned classrooms and school hall, Audio-Visual Production & Broadcasting Centre, 3 Computer Assisted Learning Centres, Student Activity Centre, laboratories, Geography Room, Music Room, Music Centre, Language room, Home Economics Room, Art Room, Design and Technology Room, library, conference rooms, Lecture Room, badminton court and basketball court.

== Extra-curricular activities ==
There are 4 houses, Bamboo, Camphor, Pine and Plum. More than 30 clubs and societies of academic, service, sports or other interests are also organised.

== Notable alumni ==
Government

- Chuang Shuk-kwan JP, head of the Communicable Disease Branch of the Centre for Health Protection.
- Chung Shui-ming, GBS JP CPPCC National Committee member

Education

- Wong Kwan Yu, MH Principal, Fukien Secondary School (Siu Sai Wan)

== Principals ==
- KONG Chee Wing (1961-1962)
- J.O. HANRAHAN (1962-1963)
- J.A. MACLEAN (1963-1970)
- S.M. STEAD (1970-1980)
- SUEN Chi Shing (1980-1982)
- WAH Yam Fook (1982-1990)
- TANG Ping Leung (1990-1996)
- KO Wing Kow, Patrick (1996-2004)
- YIU Sai Ming (2004-2010)
- WONG Ip Cheung, Daniel (2010-2016)
- TANG Suk Ching (2016-Present)

== See also ==
- Education in Hong Kong
- List of schools in Hong Kong
