= Wong Kwan-yu =

Hong Kong educator and politician

Wong Kwan-yu, SBS, BBS, JP (Chinese: 黃均瑜) is a Hong Kong educator and politician. He is the former president of the pro-Beijing teachers' union Hong Kong Federation of Education Workers from 2014 to 2022 and a current Hong Kong deputy to the National People's Congress (NPC).

== Biography ==
Wong was educated at the Tsuen Wan Government Secondary School and was graduated from the University of Hong Kong. He became a teacher and the founding school principal of the Fukien Secondary School (Siu Sai Wan). He is also chairman of the HKFEW Wong Cho Bau Secondary School.

Wong ran for the 2017 National People's Congress election in Hong Kong and was elected as alternate member with 1,179 votes. In April 2020, he succeeded Thomas Cheung Tsun-yung who resigned from the congress in December 2021.

He became Justice of Peace in 2016 and was awarded Bronze Bauhinia Star (BBS) in 2011 and Silver Bauhinia Star (SBS) in 2018.

Educational offices
Preceded by Yeung Yiu-chung	President of Hong Kong Federation of Education Workers; 2014–2022	Succeeded by Lau Chi-pang
