= Chuang Shuk-kwan =

Hong Kong official (born 1967)

Chuang Shuk-kwan JP DCH FFPH
- 張竹君
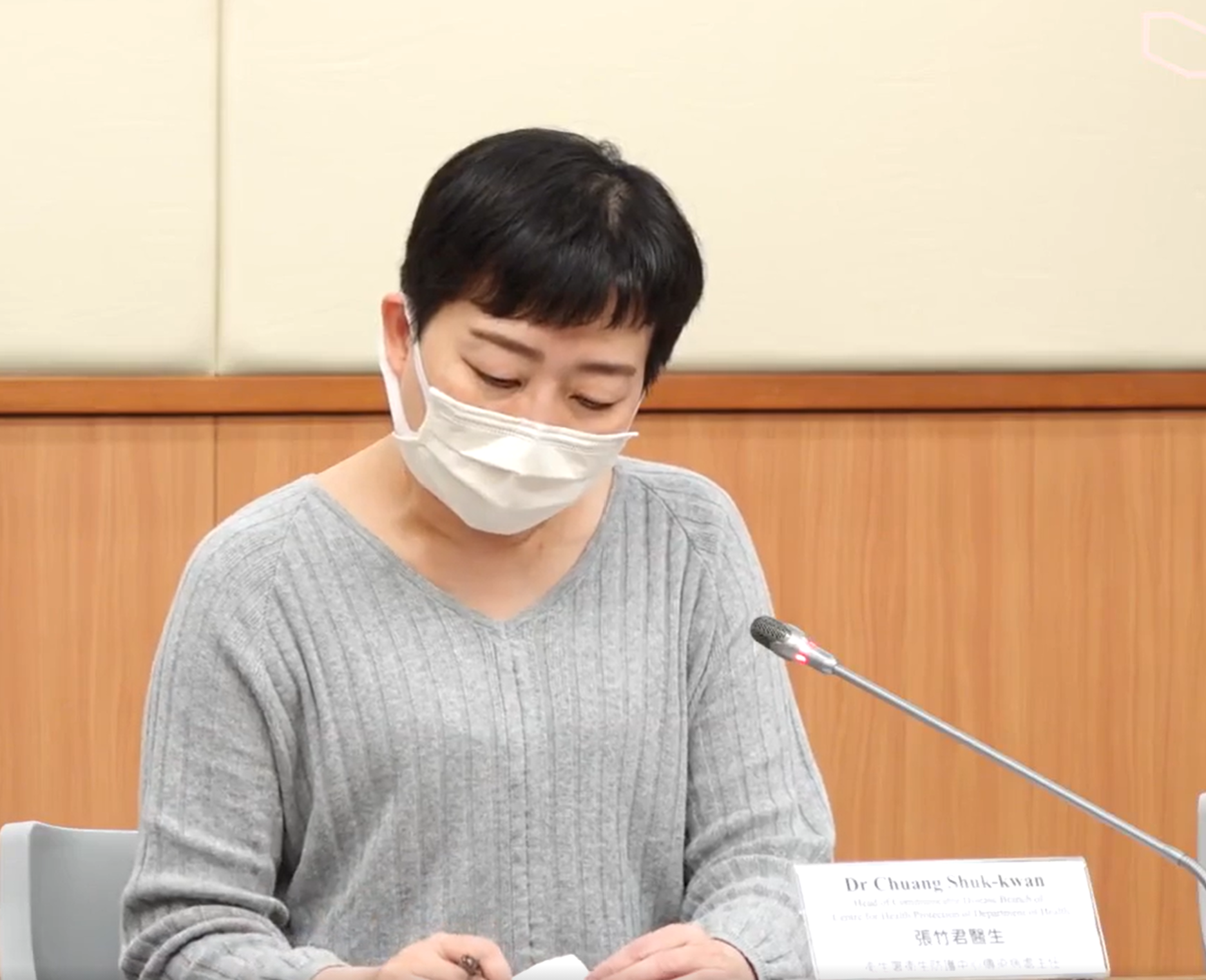
- Chuang at a press conference in 2020

Head of the Communicable Disease Branch of the Centre for Health Protection

Personal details
- Born: July 11, 1967 (age 58) British Hong Kong
- Spouse: Charles Yu Ngok-fung (died 2020)
- Children: 2
- Education: Tsuen Wan Government Secondary School; HKU Medical Faculty

Chuang Shuk-kwan (Chinese: 張竹君; born 11 July 1967) is a Hong Kong doctor specialising in public health medicine, currently serving as the head of the Communicable Disease Branch of the Centre for Health Protection in Hong Kong. She has had a leading role in the government's handling of the COVID-19 pandemic, including giving more than 700 official public briefings, from January 2020 to September 2022, for which she received praise as patient, frank and reassuring.

== Education ==
Chuang studied at Tsuen Wan Government Secondary School and graduated from the Faculty of Medicine of the University of Hong Kong in 1991. Since then, she has obtained a number of degrees and professional qualifications, including Royal College of Physicians London, UK, Diploma in Paediatrics, The Chinese University of Hong Kong Master of Preventive Medicine, Royal College of Physicians Academician of Public Health, Fellow of Hong Kong College of Community Medicine and Fellow of Hong Kong Academy of Medicine.

== Career ==
Chuang joined Hong Kong Department of Health in 1993, and started working in Centre for Health Protection in 2004. In the early days of the CHP, she served as the chief social medicine doctor and the chief doctor of the Surveillance and Epidemiology Division. She was later promoted to a consultant doctor in 2007.

== Family ==
Chuang was married to Charles Yu Ngok-fung (余岳鋒), an oral and maxillofacial dentist. They have two daughters together.

Chuang's husband was diagnosed with a brain tumor in the late 2010s and underwent multiple operations. In 2020, he was admitted for brain surgery at the Prince of Wales Hospital, where on December 6, 2020, he died of brain cancer.
