= Lau Chi-pang =

Hong Kong politician and academic

Professor the Honourable Lau Chi-pang BBS JP
- 劉智鵬
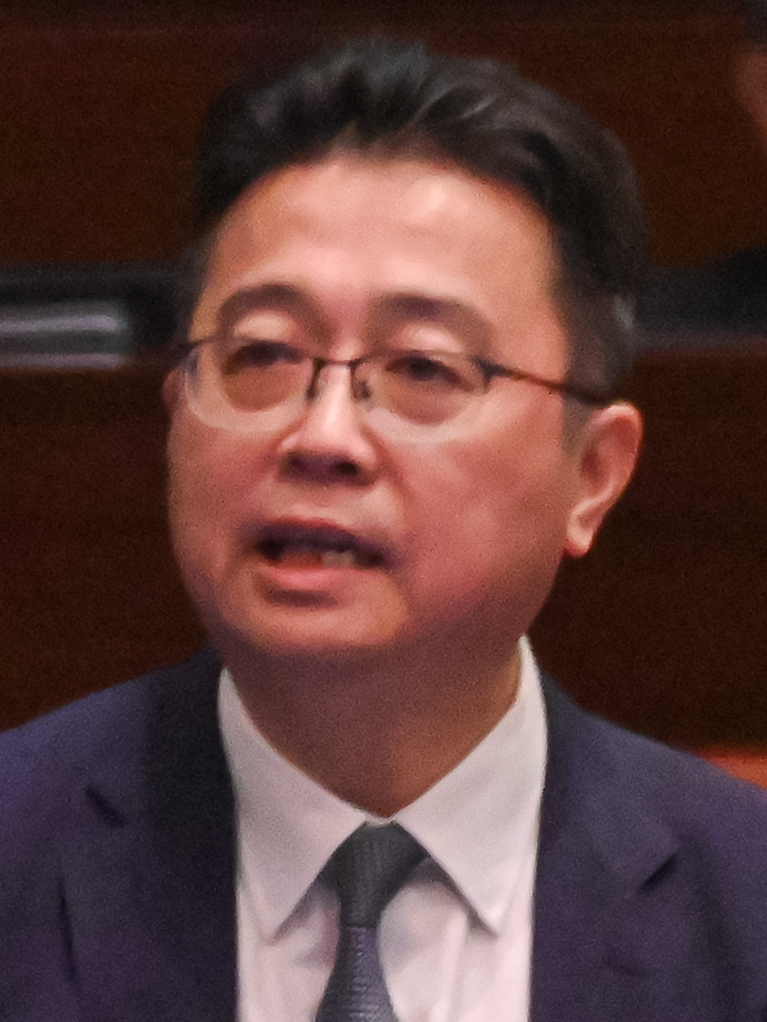
- Lau in 2023

Member of the Legislative Council
- Incumbent
- Assumed office 1 January 2022
- Preceded by: New constituency
- Constituency: Election Committee

Personal details
- Born: 1960 (age 65–66)
- Education: University of Hong Kong (BA, MPhil); University of Washington (PhD)
- Occupation: Politician, professor

Lau Chi-pang, BBS, JP (Chinese: 劉智鵬; born 1960) is a Hong Kong politician and academic scholar serving as an Associate Vice President of the Lingnan University. In 2021, he was elected as one of the 40 Legislative Council members for the Election Committee constituency which was newly created under the electoral overhaul imposed by Beijing. In December 2025, he was re-elected.

== Academic and public life ==
Lau earned his Bachelor of Arts in Chinese History and Japanese and Master of Philosophy in Chinese Intellectual History degrees from the University of Hong Kong in 1984 and 1987 respectively and completed his doctoral degree in History at the University of Washington, Seattle in 2000. He joined Lingnan University’s General Education Division in 1993 and became a founding member of the Department of History in 2002 and has been teaching Chinese history and Hong Kong history for the department.

He has served in many public positions. He is an ex-officio member of the Heung Yee Kuk and appointed member of the Tuen Mun District Council from 2004 to 2011 and the council's vice chairman in 2011. He was also a member of the Antiquities Advisory Board, Advisory Committee on Revitalisation of Historic Buildings, Town Planning Board, History Museum Advisory Panel, Lord Wilson Heritage Trust, Chairman of the Advisory Committee on Built Heritage Conservation and member of Advisory Council on the Environment.

A the advisory committee chairman, Lau in 2016 argued that Queen's Pier, which was dismantled in 2007 in the land reclamation project, should be restored in "more spacious" locations which are "more frequented by the public", such as Tung Chung in Lantau Island. He questioned the functional purpose of reassembling the historic structure between ferry piers 9 and 10 in Central suggested in the consultation document.

He opposed the Occupy Central with Love and Peace campaign initiated by pro-democracy law professor Benny Tai in 2014. In an interview with Chinese state media, he warned that the campaign would lead to regression in Hong Kong civilisation, obstruct the governance and threaten people's livelihood.

== 2019 protests and Tong Ying-kit case ==
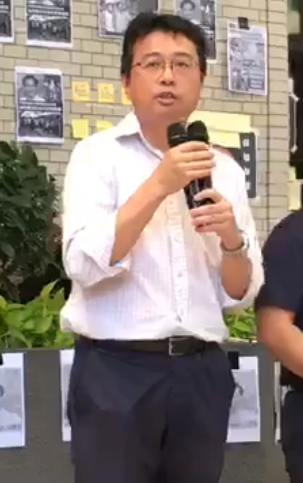
Lau in 2019 during anti-government protest

On 27 July 2019, six days after the Yuen Long mob attack on protesters during the massive anti-government protests, Lau showed up with Lingnan University President Leonard Cheng and Vice President Joshua Mok in the Reclaim Yuen Long protest in Yuen Long to "inspect the environment and protect students". They were applauded and cheered by the protesters.

In 2021, Lau became an expert witness in Tong Ying-kit's case, the first defendant charged under national security law. He said the slogan "Liberate Hong Kong, revolution of our times", on which the flag the defendant flew when he allegedly drove his motorcycle into police in Wan Chai on 1 July 2022, connotes "Hong Kong independence" or separating Hong Kong from China, altering the legal status of the Special Administrative Region (SAR) or subverting state power. He also said "Liberate Hong Kong" means snatching Hong Kong from enemies, so not accepting Hong Kong as part of China and seeing Chinese authorities as the enemy.

The High Court found Tong guilty on 27 July, and sentenced him to a total of 9 years in prison on 30 July, of which secession and terrorist activities carried 6.5 and 8 years of imprisonment respectively after part of them would be served concurrently. The court ruling stated that such display of the words was capable of inciting others to commit secession.

== Legislative Council ==
In December 2021, he was elected as one of the 40 Legislative Council members for the Election Committee constituency which was newly created under the electoral overhaul imposed by Beijing, receiving 1,214 votes. Lau also became the President of the Hong Kong Federation of Education Workers (FEW), the largest pro-Beijing teachers' union in Hong Kong earlier in the month, succeeding Wong Kwan-yu.

In 2023, Lau became a member of the National Committee of the 14th Chinese People’s Political Consultative Conference (CPPCC), representing the Education sector. At the annual session of the CPPCC in March 2023, Lau vowed to cultivate patriotism of Hong Kong youth through history education innovation.

Lau opposed the government plan to turn part of the 170-hectare member-exclusive Hong Kong Golf Club in Fanling into public housing. As a meeting of the Advisory Council on the Environment in August 2022, he questioned if the administration had exhausted all other options before pressing ahead with the plan, noting the government has floated the idea of the mega-development of the Northern Metropolis in the northern New Territories. He was criticised by Chinese state media for appearing in a video where he praised the Golf Club .Lau said that "If public housing is built on the golf course, it will become a political monument," and if that were to happen, housing advocates would "then aim at other private clubs."

In May 2023, Lau said that Hong Kong should promote red tourism, referring to McDonald's on MacDonnell Road and former police station at Yau Ma Tei.

In December 2025, Lau was re-elected as Legislative Councilor.

== Honours ==
In 2020, he was awarded Bronze Bauhinia Star (BBS) in recognition of his "dedicated contribution to built heritage conservation in Hong Kong". The government statement said that he provided "professional advice especially on the historic value and significance of the heritage buildings, and led the Advisory Committee to work tirelessly in steering the funding schemes under the Built Heritage Conservation Fund" as the chairman of the Advisory Committee on Built Heritage Conservation.

Legislative Council of Hong Kong
New constituency	Member of Legislative Council; Representative for Election Committee; 2022–present	Incumbent
Educational offices
Preceded by Wong Kwan-yu	President of Hong Kong Federation of Education Workers; 2022–present	Incumbent
