= Pauline Ngan Po-ling =

Chinese businesswoman and politician

Pauline Ngan Po-ling is a Chinese businesswoman who was elected to the 13th National People's Congress in the 2017 election in Hong Kong.
