= 2017 National People's Congress election in Hong Kong =

- 19 December 2017

36 Hong Kong deputies to National People's Congress
- Registered: 1,989
- Turnout: 90.30%
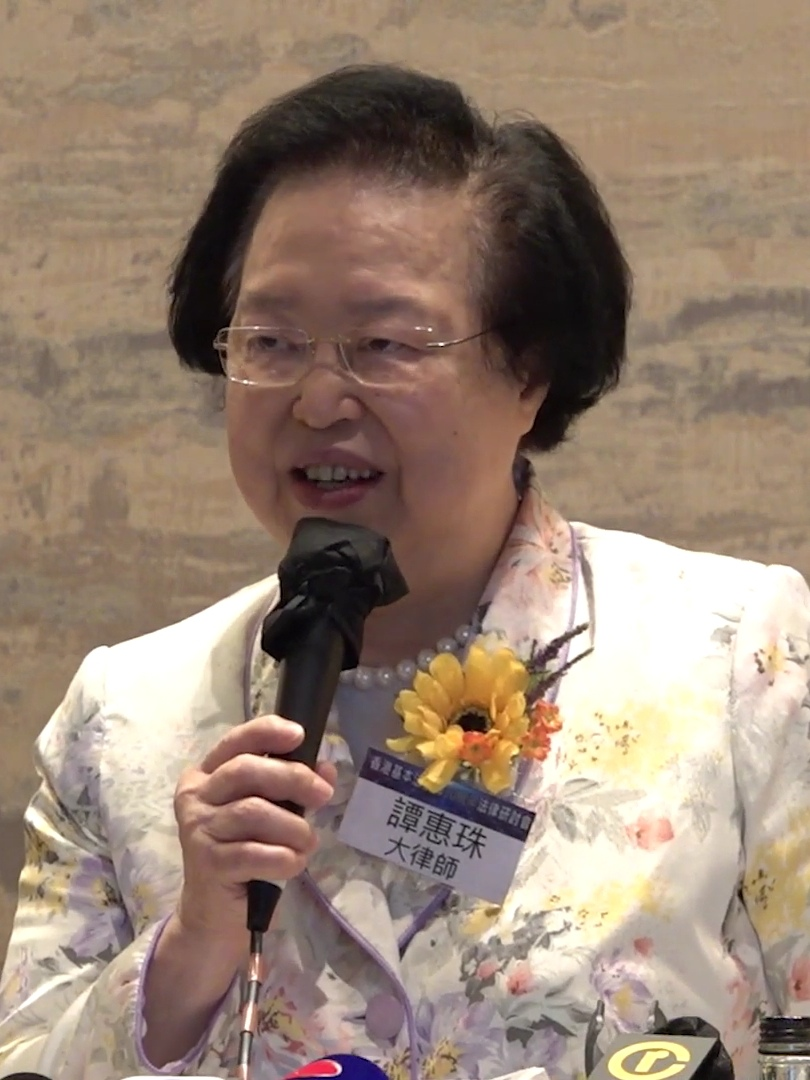
| | Majority party |
|---|---|
| Leader | Maria Tam |
| Party | Pro-Beijing independent |
| Seats before | 35 |
| Seats won | 36 |
| Seat change | ▲1 |
Delegation Convenor before election
Maria Tam
Independent
Elected Delegation Convenor
Ma Fung-kwok
Independent

The election for the Hong Kong deputies to the 13th National People's Congress (NPC) was held on 19 December 2017. 36 Hong Kong deputies were elected by an electoral college composed of 1,989 members.

== Electoral method ==
Article 21 of the Hong Kong Basic Law stipulates:

Chinese citizens who are residents of the Hong Kong Special Administrative Region shall be entitled to participate in the management of state affairs according to law. In accordance with the assigned number of seats and the selection method specified by the National People's Congress, the Chinese citizens among the residents of the Hong Kong Special Administrative Region shall locally elect deputies of the Region to the National People's Congress to participate in the work of the highest organ of state power.

A 1,989-strong electoral college composed of the following:

- Members of the previous electoral college that had elected the Hong Kong deputies to the 12th National People's Congress;
- Hong Kong delegates of the 12th Chinese People's Political Consultative Committee (CPPCC);
- Members of the Election Committee (which elects the Chief Executive) who are Chinese nationals, except those who opt out; and
- The Chief Executive of the HKSAR.

The number of the membership of the electoral college increased 369, from 1,620 to 1,989. All members were eligible to nominate, stand and vote in the election. To see the full list of the membership of the electoral college click here (only Chinese version available).

== Candidates ==
Six incumbents were expected not to run for re-election, including the member of the Standing Committee of the National People's Congress (NPCSC) Rita Fan Hsu Lai-tai, convenor of the Hong Kong NPC delegations Maria Tam Wai-chu, Sophie Leung Lau Yau-fun of the Business and Professionals Alliance for Hong Kong (BPA), Miriam Lau Kin-yee of the Liberal Party, scholar Priscilla Lau Puk-king and businessman Peter Wong Man-kong, except for Wong whose name later appear on the nomination. Two members of Chief Executive Carrie Lam's Executive Council Fanny Law Fan Chiu-fun and Laura Cha Shih May-lung also decided to step down. Other incumbents stepping down including former Secretary for Security Ambrose Lee Siu-kwong, Zhang Tiefu and Yeung Yiu-chung of the Hong Kong Federation of Education Workers.

Many second generation politicians and businessmen announced their candidacies, including Rita Fan's son Andrew Fan Chun-wah, Sophie Leung's daughter Nisa Leung Wing-yu, Chinese People's Political Consultative Conference (CPPCC) member Timothy Fok Tsun-ting's son Kenneth Fok Kai-kong, former president of the Hong Kong Chiu Chow Chamber of Commerce Cheung Sing-hung's son Thomas Cheung Tsun-yung, former CPPCC Standing Committee member Jose Sun-Say Yu's son Jonny Yu Wah-yung, Legislative Council President Andrew Leung Kwan-yuen's son Clarence Leung Wang-ching, Executive Councillor Jeffrey Lam Kin-fung's son Victor Lam Hoi-cheung. However it was rumoured that the central government did not approve of the hereditary tendency of the NPC. The second generation politicians and businessmen eventually did not appear on the nomination list.

In November, a "recommendation list" was reported to direct the electoral college whom to elect in the election. Former president of the Law Society of Hong Kong Ambrose Lam San-keung, anti-Occupy lawyer Maggie Chan Man-ki and lawyer Nicholas Chan Hiu-fung who were included on the list were all from legal sector. Former chairman of the Democratic Alliance for the Betterment and Progress of Hong Kong (DAB) Tam Yiu-chung who was expected to succeed Rita Fan to be the NPCSC member and former Secretary for Constitutional and Mainland Affairs Raymond Tam Chi-yuen were also included on the list. However the names of other second generation politicians and businessmen did not appear on the list.

A total number of the 49 candidacies were validated. Seven pro-Occupy activists of the Gau Wu group, localist activist Yeung Ke-cheong and Civic Party legislator Kwok Ka-ki were banned from the election by the presidium of the electoral college for their public remarks and acts contravening the new declaration form under which candidates must uphold the Constitution of China and the Basic Law of Hong Kong. Kwok refused to sign as he called the new requirement as unacceptable that would restrict people from participating in the election. Roger Wong Hoi-fung of the Election Committee Higher Education Subsector and Henry Lam were the few pro-democracy figures who could enter the election.

== Election result ==
=== Elected members (36) ===
- Cai Yi
- Bernard Charnwut Chan
- Bunny Chan Chung-bun
- Maggie Chan Man-ki
- Chan Yung
- Cheng Yiu-tong
- Thomas Cheung Tsun-yung
- Choy So-yuk
- Nancy Chu Ip Yuk-yu
- Ian Fok Chun-wan
- Witman Hung
- Ip Kwok-him
- Cally Kwong Mei-wan
- Lam Lung-on
- Dennis Lam Shun-chiu
- Vincent Marshall Lee Kwan-ho
- Tommy Li Ying-sang
- Li Yinquan
- Martin Liao Cheung-kong
- Lo Sui-on
- Lui Tim-leung
- Ma Fung-kwok
- Ma Ho-fai
- Ng Chau-pei
- Ng Leung-sing
- Pauline Ngan Po-ling
- Raymond Tam Chi-yuen
- Tam Yiu-chung
- Henry Tan
- Michael Tien Puk-sun
- Peter Wong Man-kong
- Wong Ting-chung
- David Wong Yau-kar
- Wong Yuk-shan
- Andrew Yao Cho-fai
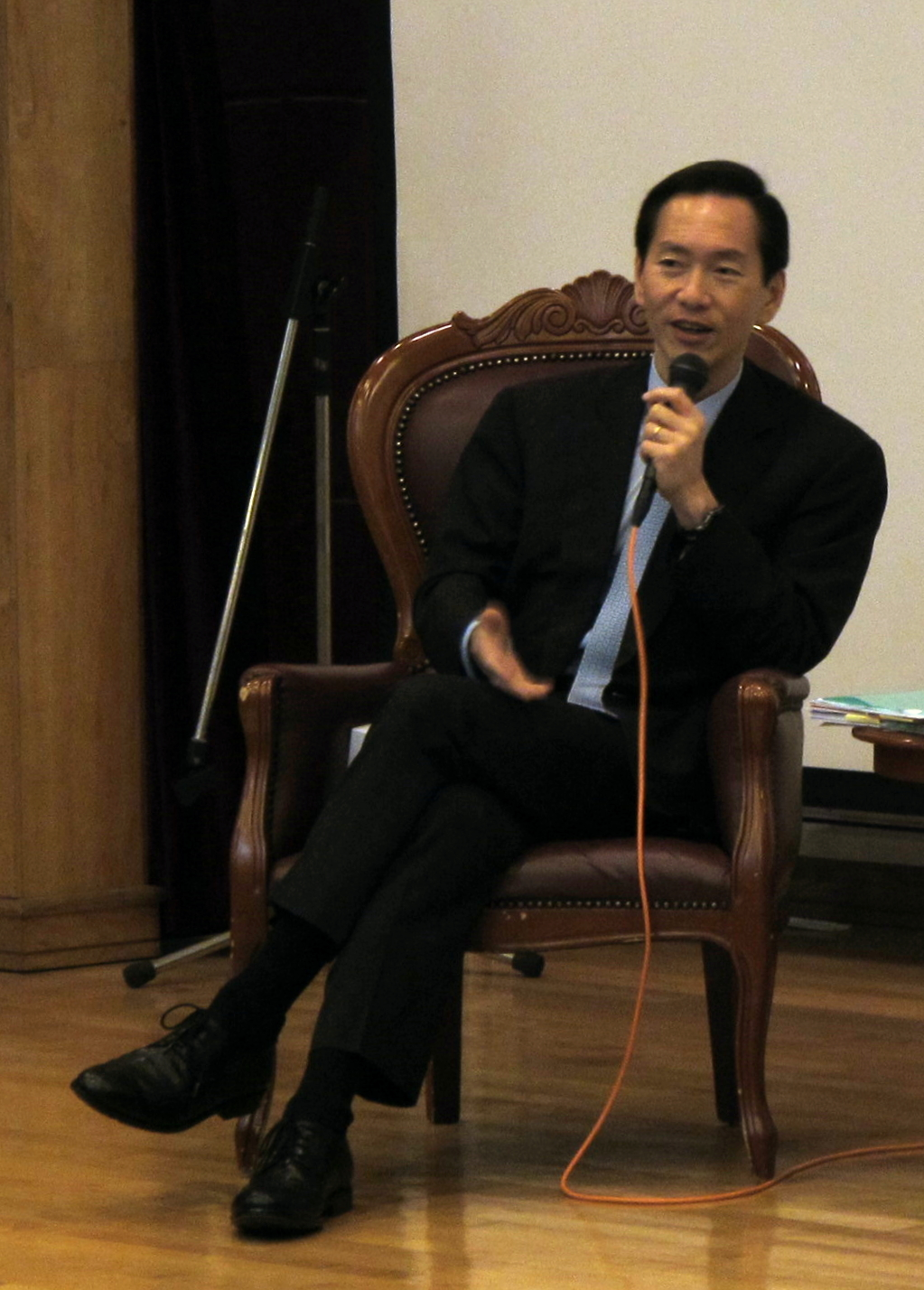
Convenor of the Executive Council of Hong Kong Bernard Chan re-elected with the highest votes of 1,693

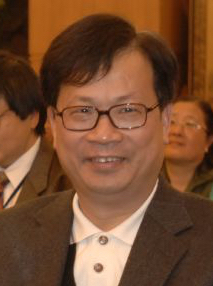
Cheng Yiu-tong, honorary president of the Hong Kong Federation of Trade Unions became the longest-serving incumbent, serving the 7th National People's Congress since 1988

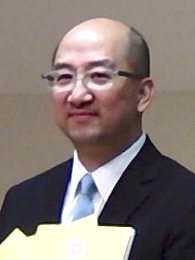
Former Secretary for Constitutional and Mainland Affairs Raymond Tam was elected for the first time

=== Supplementary members (6) ===
- Nicholas Chan Hiu-fung
- Ho Hon-kuen
- Alex Kwan King-fai
- Louis Pong Wai-yan
- Wong Kwan-yu
- Zhan Meiqing

=== Detailed result ===
2017 National People's Congress election in Hong Kong
| Party | Candidate | Votes | % | ±% |
|---|---|---|---|---|
| Independent | Bernard Charnwut Chan | 1,693 | 96.58 | |
| Independent | Ian Fok Chun-wan | 1,670 | 95.27 | |
| Independent | Li Yinquan | 1,666 | 95.04 | |
| Independent | Wong Ting-chung | 1,663 | 94.87 | |
| Independent | Ma Fung-kwok | 1,663 | 94.87 | |
| Independent | Lo Sui-on | 1,654 | 94.35 | |
| Independent | Wong Yuk-shan | 1,652 | 94.24 | |
| Independent | Chan Yung | 1,651 | 94.18 | |
| Independent | David Wong Yau-kar | 1,650 | 94.12 | |
| Independent | Andrew Yao Cho-fai | 1,642 | 93.67 | |
| Independent | Ip Kwok-him | 1,611 | 91.90 | |
| Independent | Ma Ho-fai | 1,600 | 91.27 | |
| Independent | Vincent Marshall Lee Kwan-ho | 1,594 | 90.93 | |
| Independent | Martin Liao Cheung-kong | 1,584 | 90.36 | |
| Independent | Raymond Tam Chi-yuen | 1,580 | 90.13 | |
| Independent | Cheng Yiu-tong | 1,570 | 89.56 | |
| Independent | Pauline Ngan Po-ling | 1,555 | 88.71 | |
| Independent | Herman Hu Shao-ming | 1,549 | 88.36 | |
| Independent | Tam Yiu-chung | 1,548 | 88.31 | |
| Independent | Lam Lung-on | 1,547 | 88.25 | |
| Independent | Cally Kwong Mei-wan | 1,546 | 88.19 | |
| Independent | Michael Tien Puk-sun | 1,543 | 88.02 | |
| Independent | Cai Yi | 1,543 | 88.02 | |
| Independent | Bunny Chan Chung-bun | 1,540 | 87.85 | |
| Independent | Dennis Lam Shun-chiu | 1,520 | 86.71 | |
| Independent | Lui Tim-leung | 1,519 | 86.65 | |
| Independent | Ng Chau-pei | 1,492 | 85.11 | |
| Independent | Ng Leung-sing | 1,477 | 84.26 | |
| Independent | Nancy Chu Ip Yuk-yu | 1,473 | 84.03 | |
| Independent | Henry Tan | 1,457 | 83.11 | |
| Independent | Maggie Chan Man-ki | 1,421 | 81.06 | |
| Independent | Tommy Li Ying-sang | 1,421 | 81.06 | |
| Independent | Thomas Cheung Tsun-yung | 1,303 | 74.33 | |
| Independent | Choy So-yuk | 1,297 | 73.99 | |
| Independent | Witman Hung | 1,276 | 72.79 | |
| Independent | Peter Wong Man-kong | 1,275 | 72.73 | |
| Independent | Nicholas Chan Hiu-fung | 1,186 | 67.66 | |
| Independent | Wong Kwan-yu | 1,179 | 67.26 | |
| Independent | Ho Hon-kuen | 983 | 56.08 | |
| Independent | Louis Pong Wai-yan | 966 | 55.11 | |
| Independent | Alex Kwan King-fai | 677 | 38.62 | |
| Independent | Zhan Meiqing | 664 | 37.88 | |
| Independent | Cheung Ming-man | 522 | 29.78 | |
| Independent | Ho Kin-chung | 518 | 29.55 | |
| Independent | Ambrose Lam San-keung | 283 | 16.14 | |
| Independent | Lew Mon-hung | 257 | 14.66 | |
| Independent | Henry Lam | 256 | 14.60 | |
| Independent | Roger Wong Hoi-fung | 155 | 8.84 | |
| Independent | Timothy Kwai Ting-kong | 112 | 6.39 | |
| Total valid votes | | 1,753 | | |
| Turnout | | 1,796 | 90.30 | |
| Registered electors | | 1,989 | | |

=== Result by party ===
Hong Kong local parties are not counted as national political parties and thus the below elected deputies will not carry their membership in the National People's Congress.

| Affiliation | Members |
|---|---|
| DAB (5) | Ip Kwok-him |
| DAB (5) | Tam Yiu-chung |
| DAB (5) | Choy So-yuk |
| DAB (5) | Chan Yung (DAB/NTAS) |
| DAB (5) | Wong Ting-chung |
| FTU (2) | Cheng Yiu-tong |
| FTU (2) | Ng Chau-pei |
| NCF (1) | Ma Fung-kwok |
| Roundtable (1) | Michael Tien Puk-sun |
