= Multilevel Antimicrobial Polymer =

Multilevel Antimicrobial Polymer or MAP-1 is a coating spray that was developed by researchers at the Hong Kong University of Science and Technology in 2020 and that can inactivate viruses, bacteria and spores on surfaces for up to 90 days.

The team of researchers was led by Prof. Yeung King Lun, Professor of the Department of Chemical and Biological Engineering and the Division of Environment and Sustainability.

It took 10 years to develop this coating spray. After spraying it, it forms a coating that consists of millions of nano-capsules with disinfectants, also after drying of this coating. The coating is not toxic.

In 2020 MAP-1 was effectively used in the combat of COVID-19 in Hong Kong , as it was sprayed on surfaces in public places like schools, shopping malls and school buses.
