= Centre for Health Protection =

Hong Kong public health agency

- 衛生防護中心

Agency overview
- Formed: 1 June 2004
- Jurisdiction: Hong Kong
- Headquarters: Kowloon City, Hong Kong
- Ministers responsible: Sophia Chan, Secretary for Food and Health; Dr. Ronald Lam Man Kin, Director of Health
- Agency executive: Dr. Edwin Tsui Lok Kin, JP, Controller of the CHP
- Parent agency: Department of Health
- Website: www.chp.gov.hk

Centre for Health Protection
- Traditional Chinese: 衛生防護中心
Transcriptions
Yue: Cantonese
- Yale Romanization: Waih sāng fòhng wuh jūng sām
- Jyutping: Wai^{6} sang^{1} fong^{4} wu^{6} zung^{1} sam^{1}

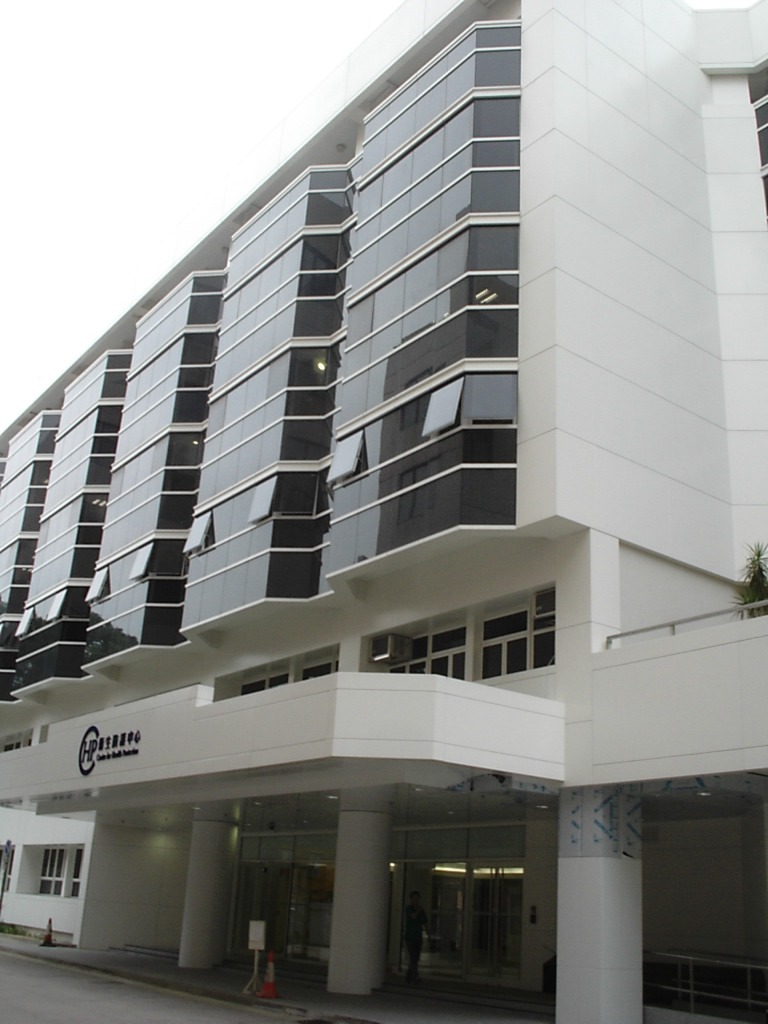
Headquarters building on Argyle Street in Kowloon City

The Centre for Health Protection is an agency under the Department of Health in Hong Kong responsible for disease prevention and control. CHP plays the same role and function as the Centers for Disease Control in the United States, and the European Centre for Disease Prevention and Control in the European Union (EU).

== History ==
Hong Kong was severely affected by the 2003 outbreak of the severe acute respiratory syndrome (SARS), with 299 people killed by the disease. The health system's performance in the face of the epidemic was scrutinised, and there were calls for an independent investigation. On 14 May 2003, Michael Mak, representative of the Health Services constituency, initiated a non-binding motion within the Legislative Council's health services panel calling for the setting-up of a select committee to investigate government officials and Hospital Authority executives. Mak commented that the SARS outbreak had uncovered "administrative and policy weaknesses", and stated, "I hope that when a similar outbreak happens in the future, we will not find ourselves in such a mess again." The motion passed unanimously, as all but one of the pro-government legislators had walked out, calling it a "witch-hunting exercise".

On 15 May 2003, Chief Executive Tung Chee-hwa launched a government-led investigation, ordering the Secretary for Health, Welfare and Food to appoint a review committee comprising local and overseas experts. The membership of the SARS Expert Committee was announced on 28 May 2003. Committee co-chairs Sir Cyril Chantler and Sian Griffiths submitted the panel's final report to the government on 2 October 2003.

One of the recommendations in the report was the setting up of the Centre for Health Protection (CHP), to be charged with communicable disease control, surveillance, planning for epidemics, and co-ordination during outbreaks. This suggestion was welcomed by Hong Kong medical experts. Deputy health director Leung Pak-yin became the first controller of the CHP on 1 April 2004. The initial operations of the centre were supported by a HK$500 million donation from the Hong Kong Jockey Club. The centre officially commenced operation on 1 June 2004.

== Structure ==
The centre has seven divisions:

- Communicable Disease Branch
- Emergency Response and Programme Management Branch
- Health Promotion Branch
- Infection Control Branch
- Non-communicable Disease Branch
- Public Health Laboratory Services Branch
- Public Health Services Branch

== Controller ==
The CHP is headed by the Controller for the Centre for Health Protection and reports to the Director of the Department of Health.

#	Name	Tenure start	Tenure end	Tenure length
1	Dr. Leung Pak-yin	1 June 2004	28 February 2007	2 years and 273 days
2	Dr. Thomas Tsang Ho-fai	1 March 2007	28 December 2012	5 years and 303 days
3	Dr. Leung Ting-hung	29 December 2012	7 November 2016	3 years and 315 days
4	Dr. Wong Ka-hing	8 November 2016	28 January 2021	4 years and 82 days
5	Dr. Ronald Lam Man-kin	29 January 2021	Incumbent	5 years and 192 days

== Functions ==
CHP deals with various health-related issues including:

- Emergency response
- Epidemiology
- Infection control
- Public health

== See also ==
- List of national public health agencies
