= 2020 Hong Kong Legislative Council candidates' disqualification controversy =

In the subsequently postponed 2020 Hong Kong Legislative Council election, 12 opposition candidates were disqualified by the returning officers from running in the election, including four incumbent legislators, Alvin Yeung, Kwok Ka-ki, Dennis Kwok and Kenneth Leung, as well as activists Joshua Wong, Ventus Lau, Gwyneth Ho and Cheng Kam-mun and incumbent District Councillors Lester Shum, Tiffany Yuen, Fergus Leung and Cheng Tat-hung.

== Background ==
The political screening of Legislative Council candidates began in the 2016 Legislative Council election when six localists were barred from running in the election for their alleged advocacy for Hong Kong independence, including Edward Leung of Hong Kong Indigenous, who had previously contested the 2016 New Territories East by-election, and Chan Ho-tin of the Hong Kong National Party. Returning officer Cora Ho Lai-sheung rejected Leung's nomination referring to Leung's Facebook posts, newspaper clippings and cited transcripts of remarks made at press conferences, and stated that although Leung had signed the forms, she did not believe that he had "genuinely changed his previous stance for independence".

Screening of candidates for political reasons continued in the March 2018 Legislative Council by-elections, where Agnes Chow (Demosistō) and Ventus Lau (Shatin Community Network) were barred from running in late January 2018. Returning officer Teng Yu-yan ruled on Chow's candidature stating that "the candidate cannot possibly comply with the requirements of the relevant electoral laws, since advocating or promoting 'self-determination' is contrary to the content of the declaration that the law requires a candidate to make to uphold the Basic Law and pledge allegiance to the [Hong Kong Special Administrative Region]".

On 13 February 2018, High Court judge Thomas Au upheld the returning officer's decision to disqualify Chan Ho-tin from joining the 2016 Legislative Council election (viz: Chan Ho Tin v Lo Ying Ki Alan & Ors). Justice Au ruled that: "The returning officer was entitled to look at matters beyond the compliance of the nomination form to come to a view as to whether Mr Chan at the time of the nomination intended to uphold the Basic Lasic Law and pledge allegiance to the HKSAR".

Pro-democracy candidate Lau Siu-lai, who had previously been disqualified from the Legislative Council over her oath-taking, was barred from running in the November 2018 Kowloon West by-election. The returning officer invalidated her candidacy on the basis of Lau previous advocacy of Hong Kong's self-determination, which showed "she had no intention of upholding the Basic Law and pledging allegiance to Hong Kong as a special administrative region of China."

== Pre-warning ==
In May 2020, the Beijing authorities initiated a plan for implementing the national security law for Hong Kong that would prominently criminalise "separatism, subversion, terrorism and foreign interference", which was widely interpreted as a crackdown on civil liberties, government critics, and the independence movement. Secretary for Constitutional and Mainland Affairs Erick Tsang suggested that anyone who opposed the coming national security law would be disqualified from September's Legislative Council elections. He stressed that it was everyone's duty to safeguard national security, and the imposition of security laws "is only natural".

After some candidates in the July 2020 pro-democracy primaries, and organisers, called for a LegCo majority in order to vote down the budget and other government proposals in order to force the government to accede to the five key demands, Chief Executive Carrie Lam issued a strong warning, saying it was subversive for them to vow to seize control of the legislature and vote down key government proposals. "If this so-called primary election's purpose is to achieve the ultimate goal of delivering what they called '35+' [lawmakers], with the objective of objecting or resisting every policy initiative of the HKSAR government, it may fall into the category of subverting the state power – one of the four types of offences under the national security law," she said.

== Disqualifications ==
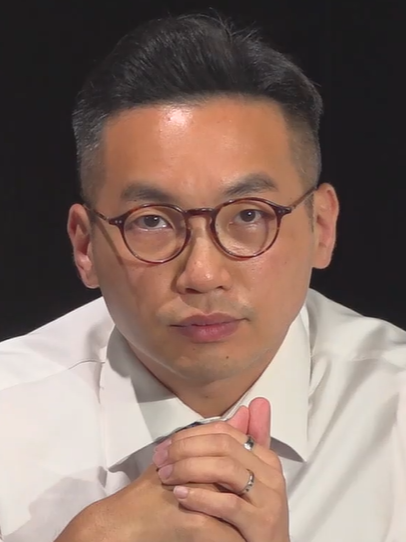
Alvin Yeung (Civic)
Incumbent Legislative Council member for New Territories East

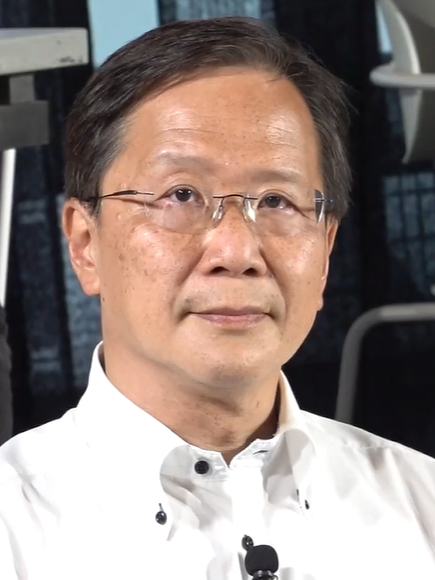
Kwok Ka-ki (Civic)
Incumbent Legislative Council member for New Territories West

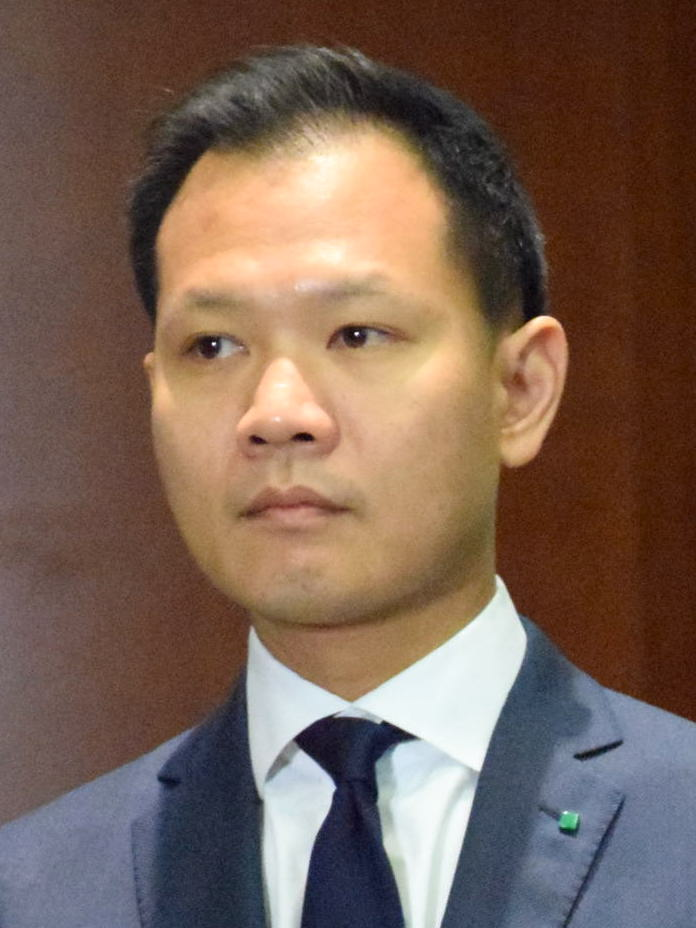
Dennis Kwok (Civic)
Incumbent Legislative Council member for Legal

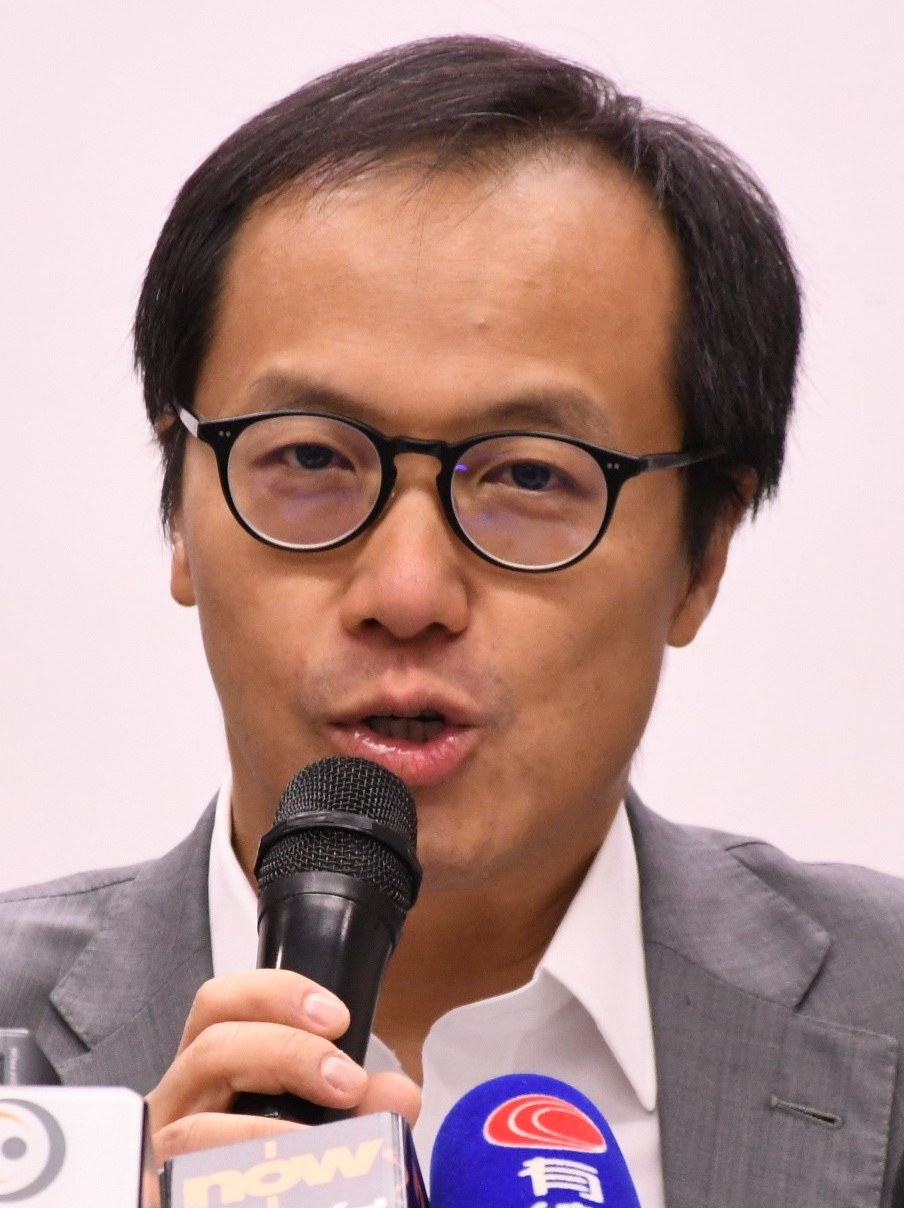
Kenneth Leung (Professionals Guild)
Incumbent Legislative Council member for Accountancy

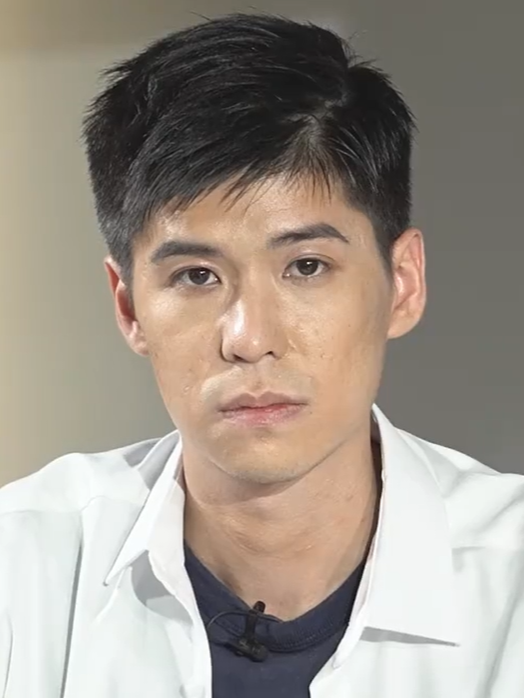
Lester Shum (Nonpartisan)
Incumbent Tsuen Wan District Council member

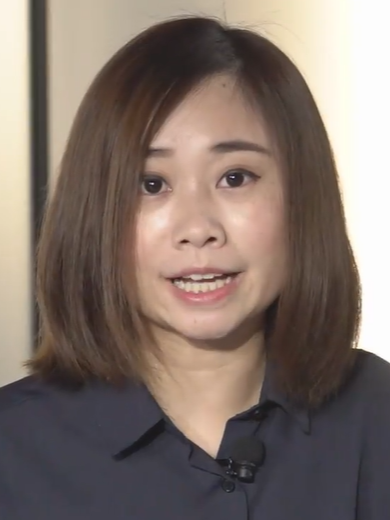
Tiffany Yuen (Nonpartisan)
Incumbent Southern District Council member

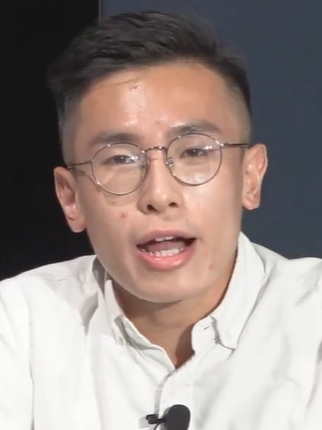
Fergus Leung (Nonpartisan)
Incumbent Central and Western District Council member

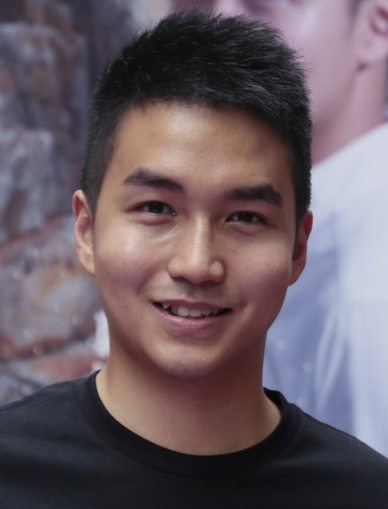
Cheng Tat-hung (Civic)
Incumbent Eastern District Council member

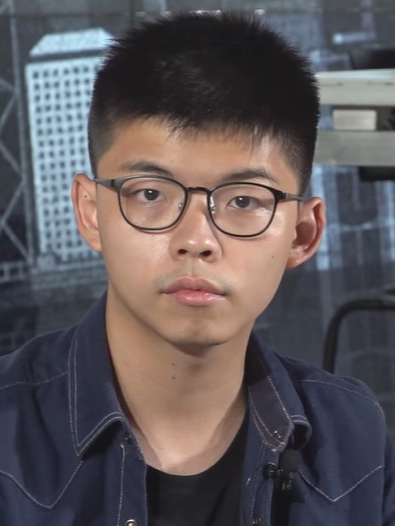
Joshua Wong (Nonpartisan)
Former secretary-general of Demosistō

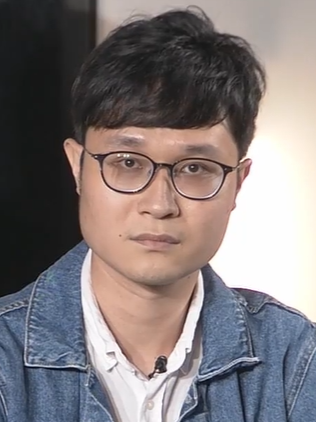
Ventus Lau (Nonpartisan)
Former convenor of Community Network Union

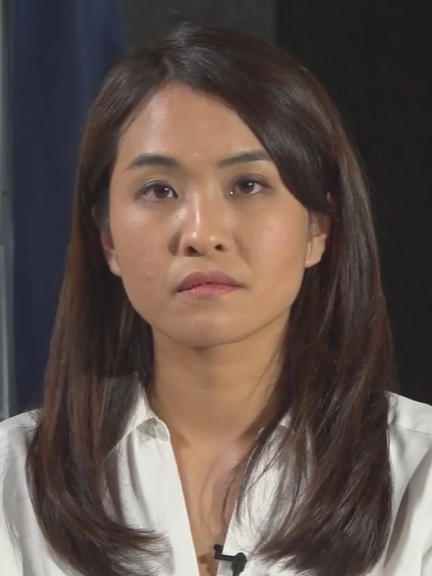
Gwyneth Ho (Nonpartisan)
Former Stand News reporter

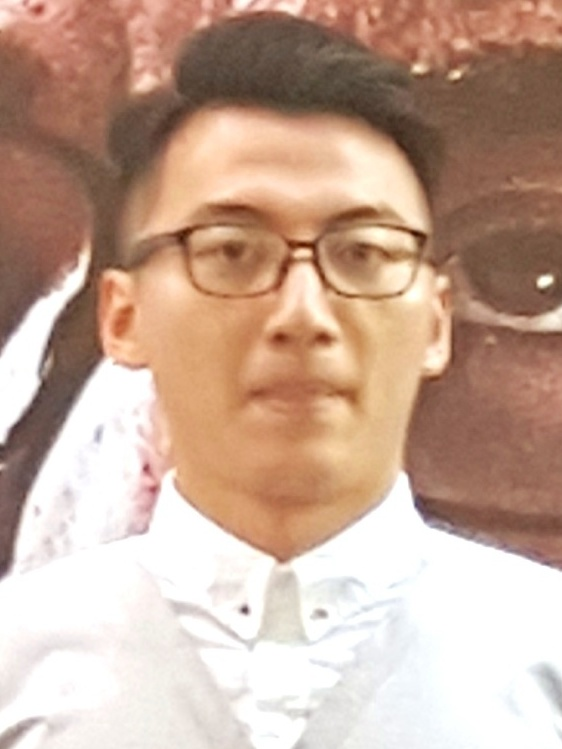
Cheng Kam-mun
(Civic Passion)
Founder of Student Front

On 30 July, one day before the nomination period ended, 12 opposition candidates were disqualified from the election. Of these, four were incumbent Legislative Council members: Alvin Yeung, Kwok Ka-ki, Dennis Kwok and Kenneth Leung. Activists Joshua Wong and Ventus Lau, incumbent District Councillors Cheng Tat-hung, Fergus Leung, Tiffany Yuen and Lester Shum; former reporter Gwyneth Ho and Civic Passion's Cheng Kam-mun were also banned from running.

In her ruling letter to Gwyneth Ho, returning officer Amy Yeung said, referring to a statement against the national security law from 25 July that Ho had co-signed: "By adopting such an unequivocal expression against the national security law, it casts serious doubt on whether the candidate embraces, promotes, and supports the fundamental principle of 'One Country, Two Systems', and therefore objectively has the genuine and true intention to uphold the Basic Law at the time of the nomination." In her statement, Yeung also referred to the statements of Ho regarding her intent to safeguard national security as "obvious sham". Joshua Wong's disqualification was based on previous statements on "self-determination" made by his disbanded party Demosistō, according to returning officer Alice Choi, as well as Wong's seeking 'foreign interference' in the affairs of the Hong Kong and central government, objection to the national security law and abusing the proper function of lawmakers by forcing the government to accede to certain demands after securing a majority as Choi's ruling stated.

Returning officers' rulings on the disqualification of the candidates
Constituency	Candidate	Affiliation	Advocated for, or promoted Hong Kong independence or the option for self-determination	Solicited intervention by foreign governments in Hong Kong's affairs	Expressed "an objection in principle" to the imposition of the national security law	Expressed "an intention to exercise the functions of a LegCo member by indiscriminately voting down" any legislative proposals	Refused to recognise the PRC's exercise of sovereignty over the Hong Kong SAR
Hong Kong Island	Cheng Kam-mun	Civic Passion					Yes
Hong Kong Island	Cheng Tat-hung	Civic		Yes	Yes		
Hong Kong Island	Fergus Leung	Independent		Yes	Yes	Yes	Yes
Hong Kong Island	Tiffany Yuen	Ind. democrat			Yes		Yes
Kowloon East	Joshua Wong	Ind. democrat	Yes	Yes	Yes	Yes	
New Territories West	Kwok Ka-ki	Civic				Yes	Yes
New Territories East	Gwyneth Ho	Ind. democrat			Yes		
New Territories East	Ventus Lau	Localist camp		Yes	Yes	Yes	Yes
New Territories East	Alvin Yeung	Civic				Yes	Yes
Legal	Dennis Kwok	Civic				Yes	Yes
Accountancy	Kenneth Leung	Professionals Guild		Yes			
District Council (Second)	Lester Shum	Nonpartisan		Yes	Yes		

=== Potential disqualifications ===
At least 21 other opposition candidates were still under review by the returning officers, including six Democratic Party legislators and Joshua Wong's nine allies from the "resistance bloc". "Returning officers are still reviewing the validity of other nominations according to the law. We do not rule out the possibility that more nominations would be invalidated," the government said in a statement. It was reported that Ted Hui, Eddie Chu, Raymond Chan, Jimmy Sham and Sunny Cheung were also going to be disqualified. However, the entire electoral process was suspended after Chief Executive Carrie Lam on 31 July announced that the election would be postponed for a year, citing the resurgence of the COVID-19 cases, leaving the validity of those candidacies unresolved.

== Responses ==
=== Domestic ===
The government issued a press release shortly after news of the disqualification spread. The government said it "agrees with and supports" returning officers' decisions to invalidate 12 nominees. "The HKSAR government reiterates that upholding the Basic Law is a fundamental constitutional duty of every LegCo Member. People having the following behaviours could not genuinely uphold the Basic Law and could not therefore perform the duties of a LegCo Member," the statement wrote.

Joshua Wong condemned the government decision to disqualify his candidacy. "I was just disqualified from running in the upcoming LegCo election in Hong Kong, even though I got the highest vote share in the primary, with 31,398 votes obtained," Wong wrote. "The excuse they use is that I describe national security law as a draconian law, which shows that I do not support this sweeping law." Wong also said that it "beyond any doubt the most scandalous election fraud era in Hong Kong history," Wong said. "Our resistance will continue on and we hope the world can stand with us in the upcoming uphill battle."

Alan Leong, chairman of the Civic Party and former legislator who saw four of his party's candidates disqualified, called such a disqualification move by the administration a big insult and harm to Hongkongers' right to vote and right to stand for election that are protected under the International Covenant on Civil and Political Rights.

=== International ===
British Foreign Secretary Dominic Raab condemned the government decision: "I condemn the decision to disqualify opposition candidates from standing in Hong Kong’s Legislative Council elections." He said it was "clear they have been disqualified because of their political views", adding that "the Hong Kong authorities must uphold their commitments to the people of Hong Kong". The government decision, Raab said, undermined the integrity of "one country, two systems" principle – which stipulates China's relationship with Hong Kong – and the rights and freedoms guaranteed in the Sino-British Joint Declaration and the Hong Kong's Basic Law.

Lawmakers from more than a dozen countries who formed the Inter-Parliamentary Alliance on China (IPAC) issued a statement condemning "the obstruction of the democratic process" of the Hong Kong government. "We urge the international community to meet this further diminution of Hong Kong’s rights and freedoms with a proportionate response," said the group led by U.S. Senator Marco Rubio and former British Conservative Party leader Iain Duncan Smith. Reinhard Bütikofer, the European Parliament member in charge of China, called on European Union authorities to impose sanctions on Chief Executive Carrie Lam.

Chris Patten, former British governor of Hong Kong, called it "an outrageous political purge of Hong Kong’s democrats". "The national security law is being used to disenfranchise the majority of Hong Kong's citizens," Patten said. "It is obviously now illegal to believe in democracy, although this was what Beijing promised in and after the Joint Declaration. This is the sort of behaviour that you would expect in a police state."

Germany announced it was suspending its extradition treaty with Hong Kong over the delay of the election and disqualification of the opposition candidates. "The Hong Kong government's decision to disqualify a dozen opposition candidates for the election and to postpone the elections ... is a further encroachment on the rights of Hong Kong citizens," Foreign Minister Heiko Maas said in a statement. "Given the current developments, we have decided to suspend the extradition treaty with Hong Kong."

The European Union High Representative said in a statement that the disqualification of pro-democracy candidates, including sitting legislators previously democratically elected by the people of Hong Kong, weaken Hong Kong's international reputation as a free and open society. The protection of civil and political rights in Hong Kong is a fundamental part of the "One Country, Two Systems" principle, which the EU supports. It called on the Hong Kong authorities to reconsider these decisions.

On 18 November, the Foreign Ministers of Australia, Canada, New Zealand, and the United Kingdom, and the United States Secretary of State Mike Pompeo issued a statement condemning the disqualification of pro-democracy legislators as a breach of Hong Kong's autonomy and rights under the framework of the Sino-British Joint Declaration. In response, the Chinese Foreign Ministry's spokesperson Zhao Lijian issued a warning to the Five Eyes countries, stating that "No matter if they have five eyes or 10 eyes, if they dare to harm China's sovereignty, security and development interests, they should beware of their eyes being poked and blinded."
