= Group of 89 =

Hong Kong conservative political pressure group

The Group of 89 or Business and Professional Group of the Basic Law Consultative Committee was a conservative political pressure group formed by the conservative business and professional elites led by tycoon Vincent Lo in the Hong Kong Basic Law Consultative Committee (BLCC) and Hong Kong Basic Law Drafting Committee (BLDC) during the drafting period of the Hong Kong Basic Law in the late 1980s. Compared to the Group of 190 set up by the pro-democracy groups, it was on the conservative side of debates over the constitutional reform, the Hong Kong Basic Law and the future of Hong Kong.

== History ==
It was sometimes confused with the Business and Professional Group of the Basic Law Consultative Committee which was founded in April 1986. It countered the Group of 190 which made up of more liberal-minded community representatives, social workers and professional in the BLCC. It disagreed with the relatively radical demands of the Group of 190 and accepted limited changes would ensure the "stability and prosperity" and "high degree of autonomy" of Hong Kong.

The group had concentrated on influencing the drafting of the Basic Law and failed to reach a single consensus with the Group of 190 which led directly to the success of highly conservative Cha proposal come up by Louis Cha. The group also used its stronger financial base to lobby against extensive democratic change. It major contribution to debate over the first draft of Basic Law was a highly emotive and misleading video showing democratic activity as synonymous with rioting and anarchy. The group hired a public relations firm to make a video which, controversially and somewhat illogically, warned of the dangers of direct elections by showing, among other salutary examples, film clips of South Korean students throwing petrol bombs.

The Business and Professional Group, part of the Group of 89, published a pamphlet entitled A Proposal for the Future Structure of the Hong Kong SAR Government. The proposals favoured close limited on the franchise, the retention of an elite system of the government, the avoidance of party politics, and the maintenance of an independent judiciary. The group proposed a conservative constitution of electing the Chief Executive and Legislative Council after 1997, a legislature with no more than 25% elected seats and chief executive elected by a 600-member electoral college, in contrary to the more progressive proposal of the pro-democratic members of the Consultative Committee.

The proposals carried considerable weight as shown by its shadowy appearance in the 1987 Green Paper on Constitutional Reform. It also appeared in the first draft of the Basic Law as one of several proposals. After the Tiananmen Square crackdown in 1989, the Group of 89 softened its stance slightly with respect to direct elections and reopened negotiations with the pro-democracy camp which led to the outcome of the "compromise model". However the compromise model divided the group between the one who favoured compromise and the ones who favoured the pro-Beijing model put forward by the New Hong Kong Alliance, a political group led by Lo Tak-shing emerged from the more conservative wing of the group.

Vincent Lo, leader of the Business and Professional Group, bitterly opposed a democratic government before and after 1997, feared grassroots participation and fulminated endlessly about the dangers of direct elections. They argued that it would be naive to think that democracy would enable them to resist Beijing: no political system could stop Beijing if it wanted to interfere in Hong Kong's affairs. Only by maintaining the territory's prosperity and its economic value to China, they insisted, could Hong Kong prevent interference from the mainland.

The core members of the business and professional group formed the Business and Professionals Federation of Hong Kong. Many of the members also founded the Liberal Democratic Federation of Hong Kong on the eve of the first ever direct elections to the Legislative Council in 1991.

== Members ==
- Veronica Cha
- Chan Siu-kam
- Chan Wing-kee
- Chan Cheng-chun
- Stephen Cheong
- Mignonne Cheng
- Cheng Yu-tung
- Tommy Cheung
- Choy Tak-ho
- Lawrence Chu
- Andrew Chuang
- Chung Chi-yung
- Chung King-fai
- Patrick Charles Samuel Deveson
- Fok Wah-pun
- William Fung
- Hari Harilela
- Edward Ho
- Raymond Ho
- Stanley Ho
- Hu Fa-kuang
- Henrietta Ip
- Ip Yeuk-lam
- Lawrence Kadoorie
- Kan Fook-yee
- Kwok Man-cho
- Philip Kwok
- Lee Jung-kong
- Peter Lee Chung-yin
- Leung Chun-ying
- Richard Li King-hang
- Ronald Li
- Liu Yong-ling
- Lo Tak-shing
- Vincent Lo
- John Lok Hsiao-pei
- Joseph Ma Ching-chung
- Ian MacCallum
- Michael Miles
- William Mong
- Steve Ng Siu-pang
- Poon Chung-kwong
- Pun Chiu-yin
- Pun Kwok-shing
- A. de O. Sales
- Seto Fai
- Helmut Sohmen
- Michael Naele Somerville
- Shung Jih-chong
- Samson Sun
- Sun Sheng-tsang
- Edwin Tao
- Tang Hing-yee
- Tang Hsiang-chien
- James Tien
- To Shui-moon
- Jeffrey Tsang
- Tsang Kwong-to
- Jacob Tse Wai-chee
- Annie Wu
- Tso Wung-wai
- Wong Kong-hon
- Peter Wong
- Philip Wong
- Ronnie Wong
- Wong Wan-tin
- Peter J. Wrangham
- Harold Wu
- Raymond Wu
- Veronica Wu
- Xu Simin
- Eddy Yau
- Howard Young
- Lincoln Yung
- Zee Kwoh-kung
- Shane Zee

== See also ==
- Pro-Beijing camp
