= Accountancy (constituency) =

Functional constituency of Hong Kong

Accountancy 會計界
- Functional constituency for the Legislative Council of Hong Kong
- Region: Hong Kong
- Electorate: 23,937

Current constituency
- Created: 1988
- Number of members: One
- Member: Webster Ng (Independent)
- Created from: Financial

The Accountancy functional constituency (Chinese: 會計界功能界別) is a functional constituency seat in the Legislative Council of Hong Kong first created for the 1988 Legislative Council election, derived from the Financial functional constituency. In 2020, the constituency was composed of some 25,000 certified public accountants (CPAs) as compared to 222,000 citizens on average for the geographical constituencies.

== History ==
It was one of the swing seats between the pro-Beijing and pro-democracy camps prior to the Hong Kong National Security Law. It was created in 1988 under British rule and the first member was Peter Wong. Wong retired from the LegCo at the 1995 Hong Kong legislative election in favour of Eric Li. Wong continued to campaign for more accountancy representation in the Election Committee following the handover of Hong Kong. Accountancy was not represented in the Provisional Legislative Council but was recreated in time for the 1998 Hong Kong legislative election.

It had the largest field of candidates in the 2004 Legislative Council election among the functional constituencies with nine candidates running in the constituency. Independent democrat Mandy Tam defeated pro-Beijing independent Paul Chan, but the result was reversed in 2008 when Mandy Tam lost her re-election to Paul Chan. Chan was resigned before the 2012 Legislative Council election to be appointed Secretary for Development by Chief Executive Leung Chun-ying. From 2012, the seat was held by Kenneth Leung of the Professional Commons (PC) until his disqualification from the office by the National People's Congress Standing Committee (NPCSC) in November 2021.

== Return members ==
Election	Member	Party
1988	Peter Wong	Group of 89→NHKA→LDF/BPF
1991	Peter Wong	LDF→Liberal
1995	Eric Li	Independent
Not represented in the PLC (1997–1998)
1998	Eric Li	Independent
2000	Eric Li	Independent
2004	Mandy Tam	Independent→Civic
2008	Paul Chan	Independent
2012	Kenneth Leung	Professional Commons
2016	Kenneth Leung	Professional Commons
2021	Edmund Wong	DAB
2025	Webster Ng	Independent

== Electoral results ==
=== 2020s ===
2025 Legislative Council election: Accountancy
Party	Candidate	Votes	%	±%
Independent	Webster Ng Kam-wah	4,389	54.81	
DAB	Edmund Wong Chun-sek	3,618	45.19	+5.28
Majority		771	9.62	
Total valid votes		8,007	100.00	
Rejected ballots		348	4.17	
Turnout		8,355	34.90	+4.45
Registered electors		23,937		
Independent gain from DAB		Swing		

2021 Legislative Council election: Accountancy
Party	Candidate	Votes	%	±%
DAB	Edmund Wong Chun-sek	3,175	39.91	
Independent	Wong Wang-tai	1,981	24.90	
Independent	Florence Poon Man See-yee	1,734	21.80	
Independent	Yung Kin	1,065	13.39	
Majority		1,194	15.01	
Total valid votes		7,955	100.00	
Rejected ballots		503		
Turnout		8,458	30.45	
Registered electors		27,778		
DAB gain from Prof Commons		Swing		

=== 2010s ===
2016 Legislative Council election: Accountancy
Party	Candidate	Votes	%	±%
Prof Commons	Kenneth Leung Kai-cheong	12,131	63.96	+13.20
Independent	Kenneth Chen Yung-ngai	6,836	36.04	
Majority		5,297	27.92	
Total valid votes		18,965	100.00	
Rejected ballots		1,066		
Turnout		19,535	75.11	+5.45
Registered electors		26,008		
Independent gain from Independent		Swing		

2012 Legislative Council election: Accountancy
Party	Candidate	Votes	%	±%
Independent	Kenneth Leung Kai-cheong	7,701	46.76	
Independent	Nelson Lam Chi-yuen	6,538	39.70	
Independent	Wong Wang-tai	1,335	8.11	+3.87
Independent	Peter Chan Po-fun	896	5.44	
Majority		1,163	7.06	
Total valid votes		16,470	100.00	
Rejected ballots		1,066		
Turnout		17,536	69.66	
Registered electors		25,174		
Independent gain from Independent		Swing		

=== 2000s ===
2008 Legislative Council election: Accountancy
Party	Candidate	Votes	%	±%
Independent	Paul Chan Mo-po	5,659	41.67	+12.93
Civic	Tam Heung-man	4,116	30.31	+1.26
Independent	Elve Kung Yiu-fai	3,116	22.95	+7.41
Independent	Wong Wang-tai	576	4.24	+2.92
Independent	Yim Ting-wai	112	0.82	
Majority		1,543	11.36	
Total valid votes		13,579	100.00	
Rejected ballots		285		
Turnout		13,864	62.24	
Registered electors		22,276		
Independent gain from Civic		Swing		

2004 Legislative Council election: Accountancy
Party	Candidate	Votes	%	±%
Independent	Tam Heung-man	3,393	29.05	
Independent	Chan Mo-po	3,356	28.74	
Independent	Elve Kung Yiu-fai	1,815	15.54	
Independent	Edward Chow Kwong-fai	1,066	9.13	
Independent	Louis Leung Wing-on	604	5.17	
Independent	Peter Chan Po-fun	603	5.16	−7.54
Independent	Choi Sau-yuk	444	3.80	
Independent	Wilfred Wu Shek-chun	244	2.09	
Independent	Wong Wang-tai	154	1.32	
Majority		37	0.31	
Total valid votes		11,679	100.00	
Rejected ballots		654		
Turnout		12,333	70.47	
Registered electors		17,500		
Independent gain from Independent		Swing		

2000 Legislative Council election: Accountancy
Party	Candidate	Votes	%	±%
Independent	Eric Li Ka-cheung	3,867	64.55	−0.49
Independent	Edward Chow Kwong-fai	1,363	22.75	−1.07
Independent	Peter Chan Po-fun	761	12.70	+1.56
Majority		2,504	41.80	
Total valid votes		5,991	100.00	
Rejected ballots		413		
Turnout		6,404	50.22	
Registered electors		12,753		
Independent hold		Swing		

=== 1990s ===
1998 Legislative Council election: Accountancy
Party	Candidate	Votes	%	±%
Independent	Eric Li Ka-cheung	3,556	65.04	+1.10
Independent	Edward Chow Kwong-fai	1,302	23.82	+1.65
Independent	Peter Chan Po-fun	609	11.14	−2.75
Majority		2,254	41.22	
Total valid votes		5,467	100.00	
Rejected ballots		413		
Turnout		5,826	59.02	
Registered electors		9,871		
Independent hold		Swing		

1995 Legislative Council election: Accountancy
Party	Candidate	Votes	%	±%
Independent	Eric Li Ka-cheung	1,376	63.94	
Liberal	Edward Chow Kwong-fai	477	22.17	
Independent	Peter Chan Po-fun	299	13.89	
Majority		899	41.77	
Total valid votes		2,152	100.00	
Rejected ballots		38		
Turnout		2,190	58.84	
Registered electors		3,722		
Independent gain from Liberal		Swing		

1991 Legislative Council election: Accountancy
Party	Candidate	Votes	%	±%
LDF	Peter Wong Hong-yuen	Unopposed		
Registered electors		2,276		
LDF hold		Swing		

=== 1980s ===
1988 Legislative Council election: Accountancy
Party	Candidate	Votes	%	±%
Group of 89	Peter Wong Hong-yuen	366	48.80	
Independent	Peter Chan Po-fun	301	40.13	
Independent	Fanny Lai Ip Po-ping	83	11.07	
Majority		65	8.67	
Total valid votes		750	100.00	
Independent win (new seat)				
