= Hong Kong Legislative Council candidates' disqualification controversy =

Hong Kong Legislative Council candidates' disqualification controversy may refer to:

- 2016 Hong Kong Legislative Council candidates' disqualification controversy
- 2020 Hong Kong Legislative Council candidates' disqualification controversy
