= Eric Li =

Hong Kong accounting professor and politician

Eric Li Ka-cheung GBS, JP
- 李家祥
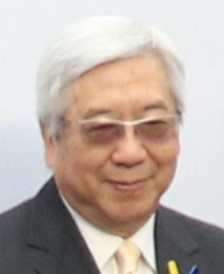
- Li attending the trophy presentation ceremony of the Queen's Silver Jubilee Cup 2023 as the Deputy Chairman of the Board of Stewards of the Hong Kong Jockey Club at the Sha Tin Racecourse on 19 March 2023

Member of the Legislative Council of Hong Kong
- In office 11 October 1995 – 13 July 2004
- Preceded by: Wong Hong-yuen
- Succeeded by: Mandy Tam
- Constituency: Accountancy

Personal details
- Born: 23 May 1953 (age 73) Hong Kong
- Spouse: Omelia Kwan Chi-hing
- Education: St. Paul's Co-educational College; Warwick School; University of Manchester
- Profession: Accountant; Legislative Councillor

Eric Li Ka-Cheung GBS JP (Chinese: 李家祥; pinyin: Lǐ Jiāxiáng; born 23 May 1953) is an adjunct professor at the School of Accountancy of the Chinese University of Hong Kong and the School of Business of Hong Kong Baptist University. He was formerly a member of the Hong Kong Legislative Council for the accounting functional constituency and Chairman of its Public Accounts Committee.

== Education ==
Li is an alumnus of St. Paul's Co-educational College and the University of Manchester. He now serves as a member of the Global Leadership Board of the University of Manchester.

== Director ==
Li is a director of the following listed companies:

- Bank of Communications
- China Resources
- Hang Seng Bank
- Sinofert
- Sun Hung Kai Properties
- SmarTone
- Transport International
- Wong's International Holdings

== Honours ==
His honorary awards include: Honorary Doctor of Laws from the University of Manchester, Honorary Doctor of Social Sciences from the Hong Kong Baptist University, Honorary Fellow of the Chinese University of Hong Kong and the Hong Kong Polytechnic University, "Beta Gamma Sigma Chapter Honoree" of the Hong Kong University of Science and Technology, Honorary Alumnus of the London Business School.

Legislative Council of Hong Kong
Previous: Wong Hong-yuen	Member of Legislative Council; Representative for Accountancy; 1995–1997	Replaced by Provisional Legislative Council
New parliament	Member of Provisional Legislative Council; 1997–1998	Replaced by Legislative Council
New parliament	Member of Legislative Council; Representative for Accountancy; 1998–2004	Succeeded by Mandy Tam
Order of precedence
Preceded by Tsang Yam-pui; Recipients of the Gold Bauhinia Star	Hong Kong order of precedence Recipients of the Gold Bauhinia Star	Succeeded by Philip Wong; Recipients of the Gold Bauhinia Star
