= Philip Kwok (businessman) =

Hong Kong businessman and politician

Dr. Philip Kwok Chi-kuen SBS, JP
- 郭志權

Chairman of the Wing On Company
- In office 1983–1986
- Preceded by: Kwok Lam-shan
- Succeeded by: Kwok Chi-leung

Personal details
- Born: 6 December 1938 (age 87) Hong Kong
- Party: Progressive Hong Kong Society; New Hong Kong Alliance; Liberal Democratic Federation of Hong Kong
- Spouse: Maxine Kwok Li Yuen-kwan
- Children: Jason; Desmond; Renee; Edwin
- Education: St. Paul's Co-Educational College; Massachusetts Institute of Technology; Harvard University
- Occupation: Businessman

Dr. Philip Kwok Chi-kuen, SBS, JP (Chinese: 郭志權; born 6 December 1938) is a Hong Kong businessman and politician.

== Biography ==
Kwok was born on 6 December 1938 to Kwok Lam-po and Sylvia Li Yuet-sheung. His grandfather, Kwok Chuen, was the founder of the Wing On Company, one of the major Chinese department stores, while his mother, Sylvia Li, was the daughter of Li Shek-pang, the founder of the Li family, one of the four big families of Hong Kong.

Kwok was educated at the St. Paul's Co-Educational College and graduated from the Massachusetts Institute of Technology with a bachelor's degree of science in Physics. He later obtained master and doctoral degrees in Physics in Harvard University. He worked as a researcher at the IBM after his studies.

He returned to Hong Kong to help his family business at Wing On in 1970 and became the chairman of the company in 1983. During the Hong Kong dollar crisis in 1985, the Wing On Bank was bailed out by Hang Seng Bank. For this reason Kwok resigned from the chairman of the company and remained as director.

He was an appointed member of the Urban Council and was the vice-chairman of the Progressive Hong Kong Society headed by the then member of the Executive and Legislative Councils Maria Tam. In 1985, he was appointed by the Beijing government to the Hong Kong Basic Law Consultative Committee and became its vice-chairman. He formed the Group of 89, a conservative faction consisting of businessmen and professionals who advocated for a slower pace of democratisation in the committee.

He first joined the New Hong Kong Alliance headed by Lo Tak-shing in 1989 but soon quit the party over the controversy of the political model of the SAR government after 1997. In 1990, he co-founded the Liberal Democratic Federation of Hong Kong, a conservative pro-business party with other Group of 89 members including Hu Fa-kuang where he became the founding vice-chairman. He was appointed Hong Kong Affairs Adviser in 1993.

Kwok is appointed member of the Council of the Hong Kong Baptist University in 2005. He was made Justice of the Peace in 1979. In 2003, he was awarded Silver Bauhinia Star.

== Personal life ==
He is also an honorary non-voting member of the Hong Kong Jockey Club and chairman of the Shotokan Karate International of Hong Kong. He currently resides at Happy Valley, Hong Kong.

Kwok is married to Maxine Kwok Li Yuen-kwan, daughter of Dr. Li Shu-pui and Ellen Li. He has four children, Jason, Desmond, Renee and Edwin.
