= Winnie Cheung Wai-sun =

Hong Kong businesswoman and politician

Winnie Cheung Wai-sun (Chinese: 張慧燊, born 1952) is a Hong Kong businesswoman and politician.

Cheung is the grand daughter of the later businessman Cheung Chuk-shan and wife of Yuen Pak-yiu, member of the Chinese People's Political Consultative Conference. Her brother-in-law was former Legislative Council and Executive Council member Lo Tak-shing. She accompanied Lo on his visits to Chinese political figures during the late 1980s and early 1990s and was a close acquaintance of Lu Ping, director of the Hong Kong and Macao Affairs Office and Cheng Hwa, deputy director of the New China News Agency.

She was a US Green Card holder and graduated from the Holy Names University in the United States.

She became member of the New Hong Kong Alliance, a pro-Beijing party set up by Lo Tak-shing and contested in the first Legislative Council direct election in 1991 against the liberal candidates Yeung Sum and Huang Chen-ya from the United Democrats of Hong Kong in Hong Kong Island West constituency.
