= Mandy Tam (politician) =

Hong Kong politician

- 譚香文
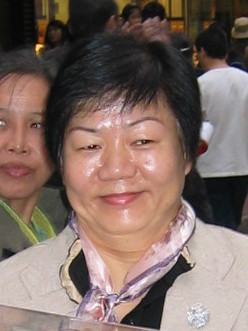

Member of the Wong Tai Sin District Council
- Incumbent
- Assumed office 1 January 2012
- Preceded by: Choi Luk-sing
- Constituency: Lung Sing
- In office 1 January 2004 – 1 January 2008
- Preceded by: Choi Luk-sing
- Succeeded by: Choi Luk-sing
- Constituency: Lung Sing

Member of the Legislative Council
- In office 1 October 2004 – 30 September 2008
- Preceded by: Eric Li
- Succeeded by: Paul Chan Mo-po
- Constituency: Accountancy

Personal details
- Born: 8 June 1957 (age 69) Ho Man Tin, Hong Kong
- Party: Independent
- Other political affiliations: Civic Party (2006–09); People Power/The Frontier (2013–16)
- Education: Middlesex University (BA)
- Occupation: Accountant, politician

Mandy Tam Heung-man (Traditional Chinese: 譚香文; born 8 June 1957) is a Hong Kong politician, tax advisor and newspaper columnist who is currently a member of the Wong Tai Sin District Council, representing Lung Sing. She is also a former member of the Legislative Council of Hong Kong, having represented the Accountancy functional constituency. Tam's columns have appeared in the Hong Kong Economic Journal and other publications.

== Political career ==
In the 2003 District Council elections, Tam was elected as a member of the Wong Tai Sin District Council, representing Lung Sing. In the 2004 Legislative Council elections, she was elected as a Legislative Councillor, representing the Accountancy functional constituency. She lost re-election in 2008 to Paul Chan Mo-po. In 2006, Tam was a founding member of the Civic Party, but left the party in June 2009. Tam lost re-election in Lung Sing in 2007 to former district councilor Choi Luk-sing. In the 2011 District Council elections, Tam was elected again after a rematch with Choi in Lung Sing to the Wong Tai Sin District Council. She was re-elected in 2015 and 2019.

Tam has been embroiled in two separate controversies, one with the HKICPA, a professional body whose members are electors of the accountancy functional constituency of the LegCo; the second one was a result of what was perceived to be a politically motivated charge of voting corruption. In both cases, Tam's conduct was ultimately vindicated by the Court.

=== Corruption accusations ===
In October 2010, upon a complaint lodged by Chow Ka-leung a, politician from a rival political party, Tam was charged by the ICAC (Independent Commission Against Corruption) with engaging in corrupt conduct in the 2008 Legislative Council elections for "[offering] an advantage, namely service in the form of a free seminar to other persons as an inducement for them to vote for her at the election." Tam said the prosecution was politically motivated and maintained that the three free seminars she organized for professional accountants did not constitute a voting inducement. Lawmakers including Audrey Eu and Paul Chan expressed concern over the case.

Tam was fully acquitted of the charge after the trial before magistrate Gary K. Y. Lam on 27 May 2011, who "drew a distinction between inducement to vote for a candidate and inducement to attend an electioneering activity". This distinction was further upheld when the case was heard on appeal in April 2012, with the judge Hon Lam J upholding the acquittal, in view of the point of law that: "It is not enough for an advantage to be offered. It has to be offered as an inducement. And an inducement to do something else is not enough: it has to be an inducement [in this case] to vote for a particular candidate [for the vote bribery charge to be upheld]." The offering of a free CPD talk to an audience of professional accountants was not judged to be of value enough to serve as an inducement to change voting preference; nor was the free nature of the talk itself considered an intention to induce to alter people's voting preferences, although it was found to be an inducement to members to attend a talk they might otherwise not have attended. In the words of the judgment in the Court papers: "The conclusion that the Respondent [Tam] did exploit the CPD talk as an inducement to the electors to attend the tea-gathering (and to hear the speeches of Mrs. Chan and herself) does not necessarily mean that she intended the CPD talk to be an inducement to vote for her... Section 11(1) itself makes it clear that offering an advantage and inducement are two different elements in the offense. Thus, a finding of advantage does not necessarily lead to a finding of inducement." The Court upheld the acquittal and dismissed the appeal.

=== 2021 LegCo election ===
Tam ran in the "patriots-only" 2021 Legislative Council election in the newly created Kowloon Central geographic constituency.

== Controversies ==
=== GST introduction survey ===
In mid-September 2006, during a period of heated debate on the Hong Kong Government's plan to introduce a GST (General Sales Tax), Tam released the interim results of a survey on public attitudes towards the introduction of the GST, independently conducted by the East Asia Work Based Learning Centre of Middlesex University. After initial reluctance, the survey questionnaires were distributed by the HKICPA, the professional body representing certified public accountants in Hong Kong, alongside an editorial by the President of the Institute stating the body's support for the GST proposal. Only 311 out of circa 26,000 of the territory's accountants responded to the survey; of those who have responded, 62 percent opposed the introduction of a General Sales Tax. In a report of the survey findings, Tam concluded that the majority of respondents opposed a GST, and further suggested that the government should look into other means to broaden its tax base. However, with a response rate of just 1.2 percent, many questioned the validity of the survey findings. In a response letter to the report, the HKICPA expresses doubt on Tam's interpretation of the survey findings.

=== Dispute with the HKICPA ===
For nearly 20 years, the HKICPA (Hong Kong Institute of Certified Public Accountants) had undertaken a newsletter distribution service on behalf of the sitting Legislative Council member representing the accountancy functional constituency. The newsletter serves as a means for the elected LegCo functional representative to communicate with those who are eligible, or potentially eligible, to vote in the accountancy functional constituency.

On 9 October 2006, the HKICPA issued a letter to all its members notifying them that the Institute had made a decision to stop the distribution of the newsletter to its members on Tam's behalf. The decision was made over concerns that, in the view of HKICPA, Tam had adopted an increasingly political stance on many issues. Although not officially related to the decision, Tam had at the time openly criticised the Institute in two Chinese newspapers in Hong Kong on various matters, including its pro-Government stance on the introduction of the GST, which further deteriorated the already fragile relationship between her and the Institute. In the letter to its members, the HKICPA said it needed to maintain its political independence and distanced itself from Tam's personal viewpoints.

Tam wrote a number of correspondences to HKICPA to discuss the issue, pointing out that as a political representative of the accountancy functional constituency in the Legislative Council, her communications to the members of the accounting profession via the newsletter service were both necessary and necessarily political, as befits the brief of the newsletter itself since its very inception. In addition, Tam would be prepared to pay for the cost of separate mailings to constituency members. The HKICPA replied each time to again reaffirm its initial decision.

Tam then sought judicial review of the HKICPA's decision to stop the newsletter distribution, and claimed the Institute's decision was unlawful on 5 separate grounds. The case was ultimately found in her favour. The Institute was then ordered to resume distribution of the newsletter to the members of the Institute on behalf of Tam as the sitting LegCo functional representative for the accountancy profession.

Political offices
Preceded by Choi Luk-sing	Member of the Wong Tai Sin District Council; Representative for Lung Sing; 2004-2008; 2012–present	Incumbent
Legislative Council of Hong Kong
Preceded by Eric Li	Member of Legislative Council; Representative for Accountancy; 2004–2008	Succeeded by Paul Chan
