= Mak Chai-kwong =

The Honourable Mak Chai-kwong GBS, JP
- 麥齊光

Secretary for Development
- In office 1 July 2012 – 12 July 2012
- Preceded by: Carrie Lam
- Succeeded by: Paul Chan

Personal details
- Born: June 16, 1950 (age 75) Hong Kong
- Party: None

Mak Chai-kwong GBS, JP (Chinese: 麥齊光, born 16 June 1950) is a Hong Kong civil engineer and civil servant. He served as Permanent Secretary for Development (Works) from 2006 to 2010.

In 2012, he was appointed as Secretary for Development in the inaugural cabinet of C.Y. Leung, but resigned 12 days later in response of allegations of corruption in the 1980s, making him the shortest-serving cabinet minister in the history of Hong Kong. He was eventually acquitted in 2016.

== Background ==
Mak studied in St. Joan of Arc Secondary School in Hong Kong. In 1973, Mak graduated from the University of Hong Kong with a degree in civil engineering. He is current a fellow and senior member of many organizations including the Institution of Civil Engineers, Hong Kong Institution of Engineers, the Hong Kong Institution of Highways and Transportation, Chartered Institute of Logistics and Transport, and the China Hong Kong Railway Institution.

He began his government career in 1973. In 1976 he was an assistant engineer involved in many KCR projects. In 1994, he was promoted to chief engineer, and by 1997, he began serving as government engineer. In 2000, he became principal government engineer, which put him in charge of development projects in eastern New Territories, Tseung Kwan O, Sha Tin and Ma On Shan.

By 2002, Mak was director of highways in Hong Kong. In 2006, he became the Permanent Secretary for the Environment, Transport and Works (Works), which post became Permanent Secretary for Development (Works) in 2007. In 2010, Mak retired from the civil service, but he continued to serve in Sichuan Reconstruction Team as team leader for the Development Bureau.

== Secretary for Development, and ICAC charge ==
Mak returned from retirement in July 2012 when he was appointed Secretary for Development in the inaugural government line-up of Chief Executive CY Leung.

Revelations immediately surfaced about a cross-leasing scam in which Mak allegedly fraudulently claimed housing allowance for five years from 1985, while a civil servant. The incident led to his arrest by the ICAC and his resignation on 12 July 2012, twelve days into his appointment. On 17 October, Mak was formally charged, jointly with assistant highways director Tsang King-man, with conspiring to defraud the government, to the personal benefit of HK$445,000. He was acquitted by the Court of Final Appeal in 2016.

Mak was replaced as Secretary for Development by Paul Chan, a former lawmaker in the Accountancy functional constituency.

== Honours ==
In 2010, Mak was awarded the Gold Bauhinia Star.

Political offices
Preceded by Carrie Lam	Secretary for Development; 1 July 2012 – 12 July 2012	Succeeded by Paul Chan
Order of precedence
Preceded by Thomas Chan; Recipients of the Gold Bauhinia Star	Hong Kong order of precedence Recipients of the Gold Bauhinia Star	Succeeded by Albert Cheng; Recipients of the Gold Bauhinia Star
