= Edmund Wong =

Hong Kong politician

The Honourable Edmund Wong
- 黃俊碩
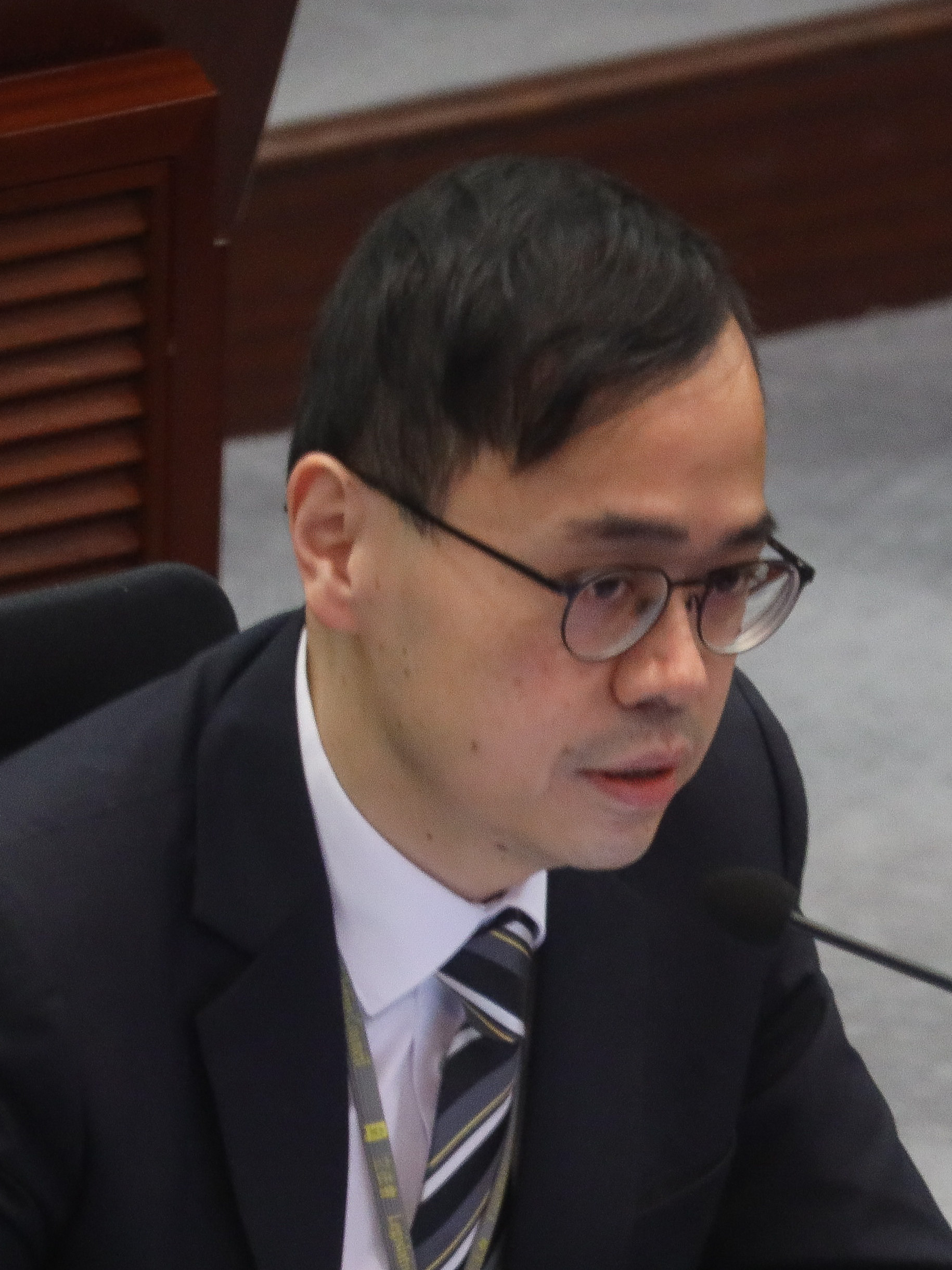
- Wong in 2023

Member of the Legislative Council
- In office 1 January 2022 – 25 December 2025
- Preceded by: Kenneth Leung (2020)
- Succeeded by: Webster Ng
- Constituency: Accountancy

Personal details
- Born: 7 January 1985 (age 41) Canada
- Party: DAB

Edmund Wong Chun-sek (Chinese: 黃俊碩) is a Hong Kong accountant and DAB politician who was the president of the Society of Chinese Accountants and Auditors in 2020. He is a former member of Legislative Council from 2022 to 2025 representing Accountancy constituency.

Wong lost his seat as Legislative Councilor in December 2025 with only 3,618 votes, making him one of the four incumbents that lost the seat.

== Personal life ==
Wong was the first Legislative Council member to catch COVID-19.

== Electoral history ==
2025 Legislative Council election: Accountancy
Party	Candidate	Votes	%	±%
DAB	Wong Chun Sek Edmund	3,618	45.19	+5.27
Nonpartisan	Webster Ng	4,389	54.81	+29.91
Majority		771	9.63	
Total valid votes		8,007		
Turnout				
Nonpartisan win				

2021 Legislative Council election: Accountancy
Party	Candidate	Votes	%	±%
DAB	Wong Chun Sek Edmund	3,175	39.91	
Nonpartisan	Wong Wang Tai	1,981	24.90	
Nonpartisan	Man See Yee (Florence Poon Man See Yee)	1,734	21.80	
Nonpartisan	Yung Kin	1,065	13.39	
Majority		1,194	15.01	
Total valid votes		7,955		
Turnout				
DAB win				

Legislative Council of Hong Kong
Preceded by Kenneth Leung	Member of Legislative Council; Representative for Accountancy; 2022–present	Incumbent
