= Martin Liao =

Hong Kong politician

The Honourable Martin Liao GBM GBSJP
- 廖長江
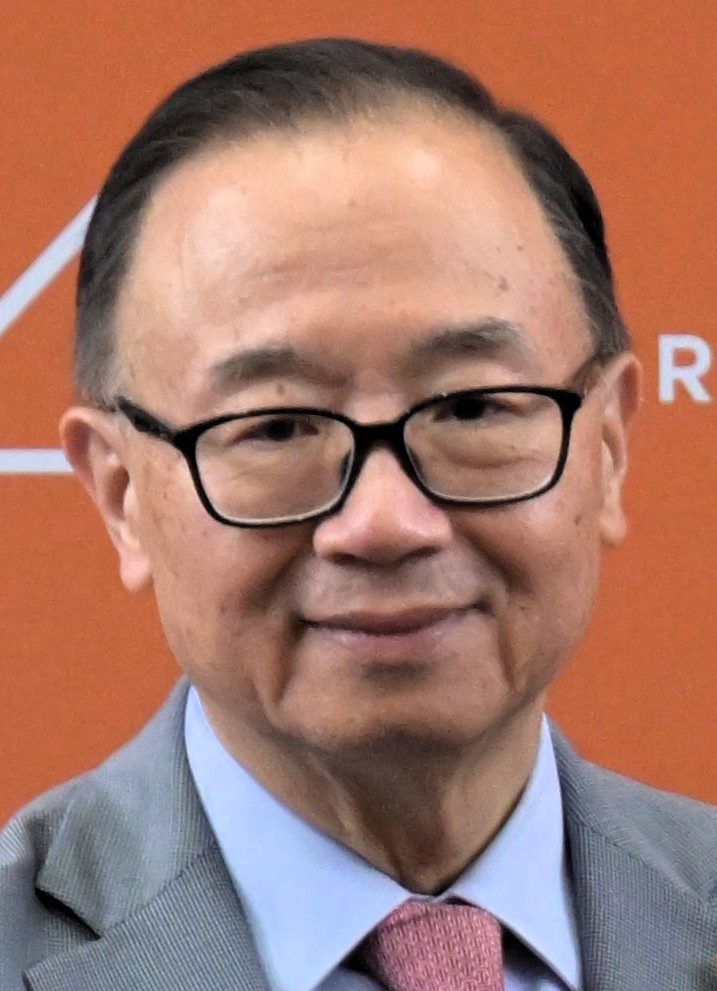
- Liao in 2025

Non-official Member of the Executive Council
- Incumbent
- Assumed office 25 November 2016
- Appointed by: Leung Chun-ying; Carrie Lam

Member of the Legislative Council
- In office 1 October 2012 – 31 December 2025
- Preceded by: Philip Wong
- Succeeded by: Andrew Yao
- Constituency: Commercial (Second)

Personal details
- Born: 1957 (age 68–69)
- Education: University College London (BS, LLM)
- Profession: Barrister

Martin Liao Cheung-kong, GBM GBS JP (Chinese: 廖長江, born 1957) is a Hong Kong politician and barrister serving as a non-official member of the Executive Council of Hong Kong. He has been the Chairman of the Hong Kong Jockey Club since August 2025. Liao was a member of the Legislative Council of Hong Kong for the Commercial (Second) constituency from 2012 to 2025, and was convenor of the pro-Beijing camp in the Legislative Council from 2016 to 2025. He previously served as a Hong Kong delegate to the National People's Congress from 2008 to 2023.

== Early life and education ==
Liao was born in British Hong Kong in 1957 and grew up in Luen Wo Hui, a market town in the northern New Territories. He was raised in a Christian family and attended Ying Wa College, a protestant secondary school in Kowloon, before transferring to a secondary school in the United Kingdom.

Liao subsequently attended University College London, where he obtained a Bachelor of Science in Economics with honours and Master of Laws. He was called to the Bar in England and Wales in 1984 and in Hong Kong in 1985, and was admitted as an Advocate and Solicitor in Singapore in 1992. He served as a member of the Copyright Tribunal from 2001 to 2005.

As a young barrister, Liao initially supported the 1989 student protests in Tiananmen Square and opposed the Chinese government's armed crackdown; along with a number of other legal figures, Liao signed a statement urging Beijing to lay down arms and enter into negotiations with the students.

== Political career ==
Liao became a member of the National People's Congress in 2008, serving until 2023.

In the 2012 Hong Kong legislative election, Liao was elected unopposed to the Commercial (Second) functional constituency, having been nominated by the Chinese General Chamber of Commerce.

He retained his Legislative Council seat in the 2016 election, again without having to face an opponent. He became convenor of the pro-establishment caucus after Ip Kwok-him of the Democratic Alliance for the Betterment and Progress of Hong Kong (DAB) retired.

In November 2016, he was appointed by Chief Executive Leung Chun-ying to the Executive Council of Hong Kong.

In November 2020, following the expulsion of 4 pro-democracy lawmakers in the Legislative Council, Liao claimed that despite there being no opposition members in the Legislative Council, there would still be opposing views within the legislature.

In January 2021, Liao partially blamed teachers on the 2019-20 Hong Kong protests and said that teachers could have "ulterior political motives" in classrooms which could "deeply impact students negatively."

In February 2021, after Xia Baolong said that only "patriots" could be part of the Hong Kong government and that electoral changes would be needed, Liao agreed and said that it was not up to those in Hong Kong to decide rules on electoral changes, and that "It must be a matter for the National People's Congress and the National People's Congress Standing Committee. Hong Kong has no say in any amendments to the Basic Law."

In March 2021, Liao supported changes to Hong Kong's election system and criticized democratic systems, claiming that the changes would make Hong Kong less prone to "dictatorship of the majority." In addition, Liao claimed that "Many people in Hong Kong are politically immature" and that one vote per person would not be suitable for Hong Kong.

In March 2021, Liao criticized RTHK, claiming that the station was biased against the government.

In December 2021, Liao was re-elected as Legislative Councilor through Commercial (Second) functional constituency with 176 votes.

In February 2022, Liao told SCMP that he would not be attending the 2022 Two Sessions as a Hong Kong delegate.

In October 2025, Liao decided to retire as Legislative Councilor after 13 years of service.

== Personal life ==
Liao became a member of the then Royal Hong Kong Jockey Club in 1988, becoming a Voting Member in 2002 and a Steward in 2013. He was elected Deputy Chairman of the Club on 23 May 2023.

Andrew Liao, Liao's older brother, is also a politician and barrister.

== Honours and awards ==
Liao was appointed a Justice of the Peace in 2004 and received a Silver Bauhinia Star in 2014. He was awarded the Gold Bauhinia Star in 2019 in recognition of his "strong commitment to serve the community" and his "distinguished record of public service". In 2024, he received Hong Kong's highest honour, the Grand Bauhinia Medal, for his work in facilitating the passage of the Safeguarding National Security Ordinance.

Legislative Council of Hong Kong
Preceded by Philip Wong	Member of Legislative Council; Representative for Commercial (Second); 2012–present	Incumbent
Preceded by Ip Kwok-him	Convenor of the pro-Beijing camp 2016–present	Incumbent
Order of precedence
Previous: Tommy Cheung; Member of the Executive Council	Hong Kong order of precedence Member of the Executive Council	Succeeded by Joseph Yam; Member of the Executive Council
