= I.R.A. MacCallum =

Ian Robert Anderson MacCallum (1931 – 5 April 2013) was a British solicitor and politician in Hong Kong.

MacCallum was a soldier at the Royal Army Service Corps before he was admitted as a solicitor of England and Wales in 1953 and then of Hong Kong in 1956. He started his practice from 1956 to 1994 in Hong Kong. He was the senior partner of the leading law firm Wilkinson & Grist.

He served in many public offices, including the membership of the council from 1969, vice-president in 1973, president in 1975 and 1976 and the membership Roll of Honour of the Law Society of Hong Kong and a core member of the Hong Kong General Chamber of Commerce. MacCallum was also Chairman of the Hong Kong Branch of Civil Rights Group Justice in the 1970s and 1980s.

In 1985 he was appointed to the Hong Kong Basic Law Consultative Committee, a consultative committee for the drafting of the Basic Law of Hong Kong. He was part of the conservative wing Group of 89 in the committee resisting the faster pace of democratisation. He initially intended to run in the 1988 Legislative Council election for the First Commercial functional constituency elected by the Hong Kong General Chamber of Commerce. However, he was persuaded by the Group of 89 to make way for Veronica Wu, daughter-in-law of tycoon Cha Chi-ming, who eventually lost to Jimmy McGregor.

MacCallum also served in voluntary positions in the Salvation Army, the Methodist International Church, St. James’ Settlement, Hong Kong Bible Society and Friends of Cambridge University Prince Philip Scholarships and Honorary Permanent President of the HKBU Foundation. He was the vice-chairman and a founding trustee of the Croucher Foundation appointed by Noel Croucher.

MacCallum died on 5 April 2013, aged 82.
