= Paul Chan Mo-po =

Hong Kong politician

The Honourable Paul Chan Mo-po GBM GBS MH JP
- 陳茂波
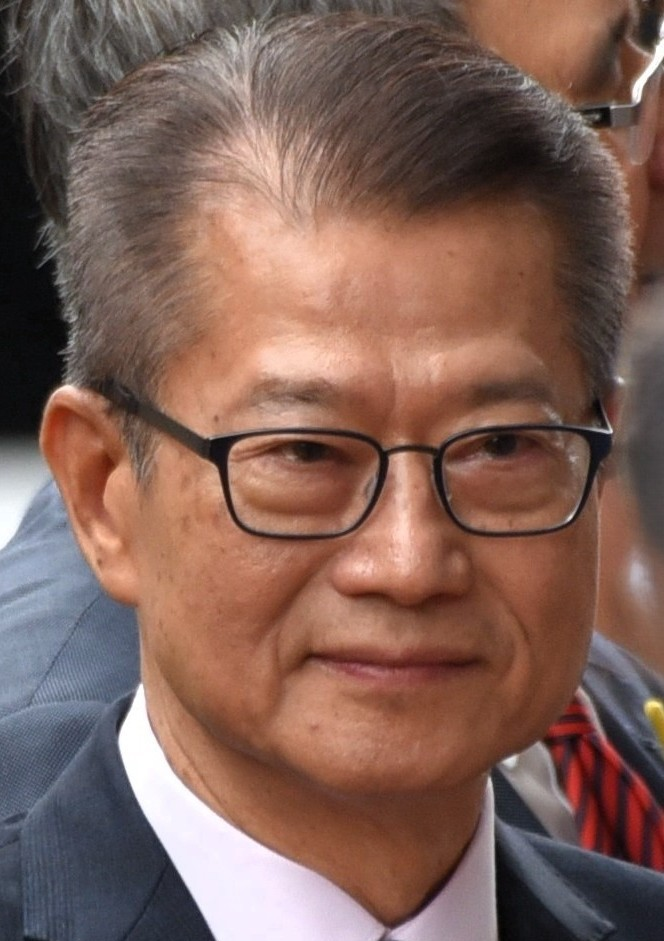
- Paul Chan in February 2026

5th Financial Secretary of Hong Kong
- Incumbent
- Assumed office 16 January 2017
- Chief Executive: Leung Chun-ying; Carrie Lam; John Lee
- Preceded by: John Tsang

Secretary for Development
- In office 30 July 2012 – 16 January 2017
- Chief Executive: Leung Chun-ying
- Preceded by: Mak Chai-kwong
- Succeeded by: Eric Ma

Member of the Legislative Council
- In office 1 October 2008 – 29 July 2012
- Preceded by: Mandy Tam
- Succeeded by: Kenneth Leung
- Constituency: Accountancy

Personal details
- Born: 18 March 1955 (age 71) Hong Kong
- Party: Independent
- Spouse: Frieda Hui Po-ming
- Education: Chinese University of Hong Kong (BBA, MBA)
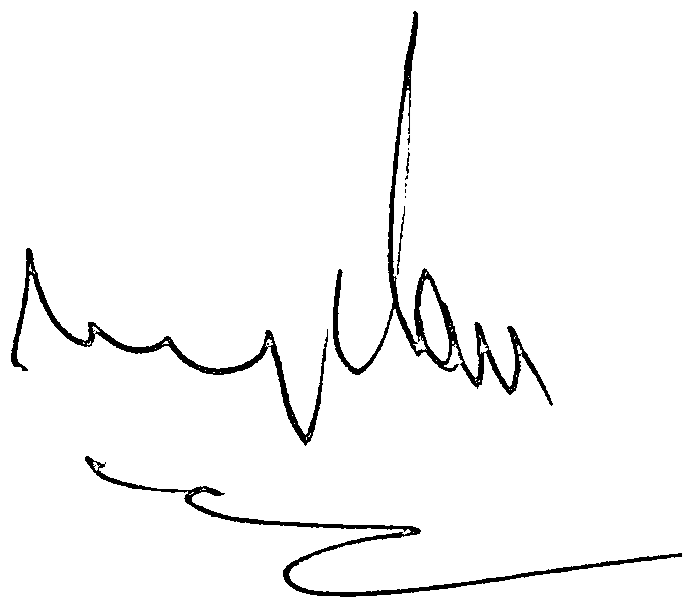
- Signature

Paul Chan Mo-po
- Traditional Chinese: 陳茂波
- Simplified Chinese: 陈茂波
Transcriptions
Standard Mandarin
- Hanyu Pinyin: Chén Maòbō
- IPA: [ʈʂʰə̌n.mâʊ.pwó]
Yue: Cantonese
- Yale Romanization: Chàhn Mauh bō
- Jyutping: Can^{4} Mau^{6} bo^{1}
- IPA: [tsʰɐn˩.mɐw˨.pɔ˥]

Paul Chan Mo-po GBM GBS MH JP (Chinese: 陳茂波; born 18 March 1955) is a Hong Kong politician who has served as the Financial Secretary of Hong Kong since 2017 and formerly as Secretary for Development from 2012 to 2017. He was a member of the Legislative Council of Hong Kong (Accountancy functional constituency).

He is an accountant and the former President of the Hong Kong Institute of Certified Public Accountants (HKICPA). He holds BBA and MBA degrees from the Chinese University of Hong Kong, where he is an Adjunct Associate Professor. He has also studied at the Harvard Business School.

He was awarded the Grand Bauhinia Medal (GBM) by the Hong Kong SAR Government in 2017.

== Biography ==
Chan is the eldest of a family of four, grew up in a resettlement estate that his family lived in until a fire destroyed Shek Kip Mei in 1953. Chan was admitted to the Chinese University of Hong Kong, where he graduated with an accounting degree. At one time, he worked by day in the Inland Revenue and by night as a lecturer. He later set up his own accounting firm.

He is an accountant who holds BBA and MBA degrees from the Chinese University of Hong Kong and has also studied at the Harvard Business School. As the former president of the Hong Kong Institute of Certified Public Accountants (HKICPA), he stood for the accountancy Functional constituency and was elected to the Legislative Council of Hong Kong in 2008. He is an Adjunct Associate Professor at the Chinese University of Hong Kong.

He was appointed the Secretary for Development and inducted into the CY Leung administration on 30 July 2012 to replace Mak Chai-kwong, who resigned earlier that month over a housing allowance fraud scandal. He resigned from the Legislative Council on the same day.

He is married to Frieda Hui, and the couple have a son and a daughter.

=== Subdivided flats scandal ===
As Development Secretary, Paul Chan is responsible for the Buildings Department, whose mission includes dealing with illegal structures. Chan soon became embroiled in a scandal when his wife, Frieda Hui, through a company of which he was a former director, was found to own several properties that had been illegally subdivided. Chan denied any knowledge of the subdivided properties and said that in any event he ceased to be a director of the company holding the properties in 1997. After having been served rectification notices by the Building Department, Chan was quoted as saying that tenants partitioned the properties in breach of their leases.

Ming Pao subsequently revealed that, between 1994 and 1996, Harvest Charm Development acquired a total of 10 old flats in Tai Kok Tsui and Jordan while both Chan and his wife Freida were directors. Five of these properties were shown to have been subdivided. When confronted with the facts, Chan said his initial denial meant he had "no knowledge of the current status [at those properties]"

His initial silence, and then self-contradictory public statements on the matter that were widely seen as deceptive, led to calls for his resignation. Ming Pao said that Chan must restore public confidence in him by "coming up with some convincing evidence that he has no intention to deceive the public". The convenor of the Executive Council also questioned Chan's credibility and the impact of the unfolding scandal on the credibility of the government. Chan gave a pledge that he and his wife would not make further investments in the property market, and would divest their shares in Harvest Charm Development, the company at the centre of the controversy.

=== Development land scandal ===
In July 2013, Chan was once again the subject of controversy when Apple Daily revealed that he or his family had an interest in a plot of land in Kwu Tung in the New Territories that the government had plans to develop. Chan was responsible for pushing the project through, and was accused of conflict of interest and failure to make proper disclosure. An editorial in The Standard noted that, with the exception of Regina Ip, all other pro-establishment figures either remained silent or distanced themselves from Chan over the matter.

Chan's signature appears on the initial purchase agreement for 20,000 square feet plot of farmland near Sheung Shui. The deal was finalised by a company in which his wife held shares. Chan said that the land was acquired in 1994 at a cost of HK$350,000 for the family's leisure use. According to an exposé by Apple Daily, the land acquired in 1994 by Chan/Hui through a web of offshore-registered companies, which included 37.5% stake held by BVI-registered Orient Express Holdings Ltd., and Orient Express was held by Frieda Hui (90%) and their son, James (10%). Paul Chan, claiming to be the owner of a piece of land, collected rent in 1996 and issued a receipt to a villager that was using it to grow crops. Chan signed it with a company chop of Statement Industries Ltd. Chan claimed not to remember whether he held out to being the owner of the land. Chan said he informed Chief Executive CY Leung of the purchase when he became aware of the government's plan to develop a new town in September 2012, and also informed the Executive Council. His wife then sold her 37.5 percent stake to her family the next month; Executive council members are not required to declare interests of their spouses or family. According to Apple Daily, the 37.5% stake of the property held by Oriental Express was sold to her brother on 10 October at HK$2.7 million, and at a profit of around HK$2 million. Although Chan claimed this was at an arms length transaction, the price is estimated to be half the compulsory purchase price. Some legislators and pundits called upon Chan to recuse himself from the project due to his potential conflict of interest, but he refused.

=== Libel case ===
In September 2014, the Development Secretary and his wife were found guilty of libel.

In 2012 his wife Frieda Hui Po-ming sent a total of six e-mails between 1 and 16 December 2011 to the Chinese International School and about 10 fellow parents of year 13 pupils alleging that Jonathan Lu and his twin sister, Caitlin, had cheated in economics tests. The emails also alleged that their father Carl, who was a parent governor at the school, attempted to suppress the incident. Four of the emails were written after the school section head had informed her of two investigations that had exonerated the twins. She wrote one more accusatory letter on 16 December, the day after the school had concluded a third investigation and had publicly issued a circular to all students of the findings.

During the trial, Chan attempted to implicate his wife as wholly responsible for the emails, resulting in Chan being satirised for once again employing the "BMW" defence – acronym for "Blame My Wife". However, the plaintiffs successfully argued that Paul Chan was complicit in the attempted character assassination as he was co-signatory, his Legislative Council email address was copied on the correspondence. In the emails, Hui used her husband's occupation as a legislator to leverage her accusations.

At the end of the case, the judge found that there had been no actual evidence supporting Chan and his wife's accusations. The High Court ordered the couple to pay damages to the plaintiffs amounting to HK$230,000.

=== Drinking and driving ===
In October 2012, footage provided by Apple Daily showed someone who looked like Chan driving his car and crossing double white lines. Chan admitted to driving after drinking, and said he was "confident" he was not above the legal limit. Chan later said "I agree that one shouldn't drive after drinking."

== Financial secretary ==
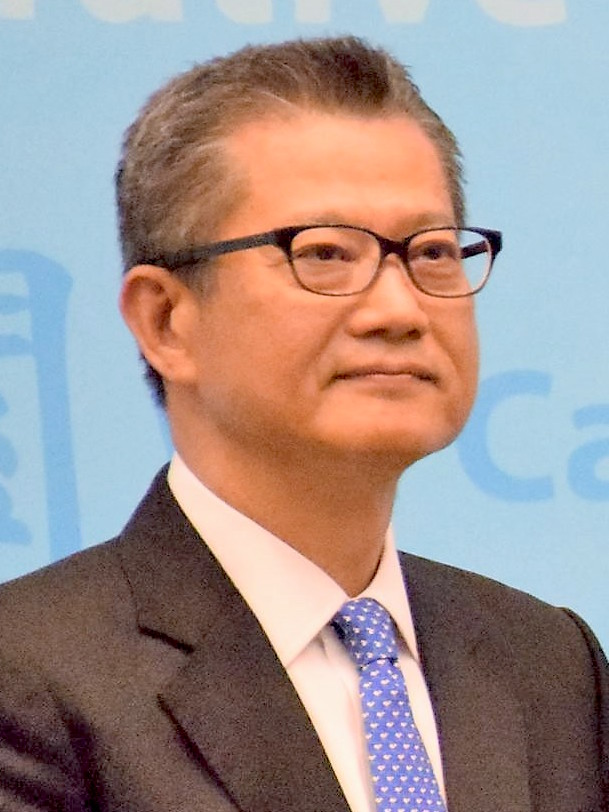
Chan in 2017

In March 2021, Chan claimed that it was "absolutely reasonable" that Beijing was planning to implement electoral changes to have only "patriots" serve in the government.

After the Heritage Foundation downgraded Hong Kong's ranking from their yearly economic freedom index report, Chan said that "When they arrived at that decision, they must have been clouded by their ideological inclination and political bias" and also disputed the view that Beijing is in charge of the city's economic policies.

=== National security ===
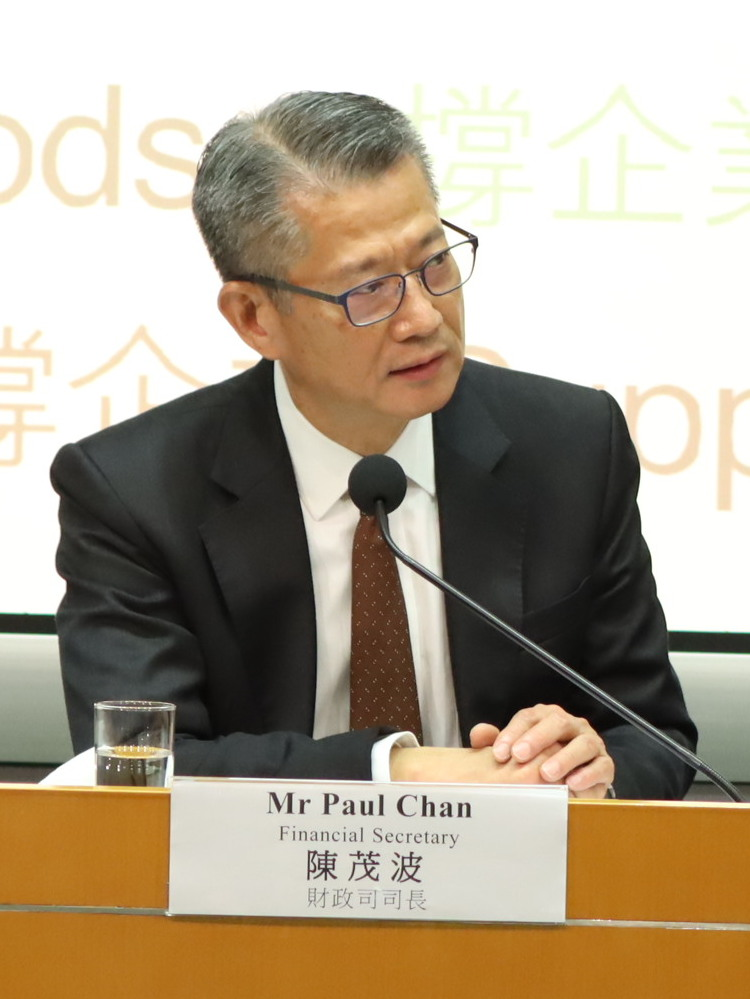
Chan in 2020 during a press conference

In February 2021's budget announcement, Chan allocated HKD $8,000,000,000 for a "non-recurrent appropriation to a special fund to meet the expenditure for safeguarding national security". It was not mentioned in his speech but rather in a 1000-page document, and Chan said that it would be spent "over the next couple of years", without giving further detail. Jeremy Tam, in response, said that "Eight billion is quite a large amount of money, particularly in this funding you do not have any transparency. We don't know how they are going to use it ... we have absolutely no idea."

Chan approved of another HKD $5,000,000,000 for national security in May 2023.

=== Housing ===
In July 2021, Xia Baolong stated that before 2049, "We expect Hong Kong society to be more harmonious and peaceful, and the housing problems that we are all concerned about will have been greatly improved. We will bid farewell to subdivided flats and 'cage homes'".

Shortly afterwards, Chan interviewed with SCMP, vowing to help fix issues with housing in Hong Kong. Chan said that land supply would need to be increased, and planning procedures would need to be simplified. Chan suggested that town planning laws needed to be changed to be more effective, and in response, a member from the Liber Research Community said that public participation in planning was essential.

In October 2022, Chan said that the public should not fixate on if new sites for housing are on green belt sites or are close to country parks, after some environmental groups expressed concerns about John Lee's policy address on rezoning 255 hectares of such land for housing.

In January 2023, Chan said that the government had decided against implementing a vacancy tax on empty apartments.

On 11 January 2023, Chan said the government would not sell land for housing if bids failed to meet the government's reserve prices. In October 2023, Chan then said that the city's deficit would be larger than expected, due to the lack of land sales.

=== Taiwan ===
In August 2022, Chan criticized Nancy Pelosi's visit to Taiwan. Chan and other government officials were criticized by Lew Mon-hung for "crossing the line" with his statements on Taiwan, as the Basic Law stipulates that diplomatic affairs of Hong Kong are to be handled by China's Foreign Ministry.

=== Government COVID-19 policies ===
On 11 September 2022, Chan said in his blog that increasing the vaccination rate in Hong Kong would be key to reopening the border, without specifying percentages. The same day, the government reported that the first-dose vaccination rate was 93.7%, second-dose rate was 91.1%, and third-dose rate was 74.6%.

On 19 September 2022, Chan claimed that local citizens might be fine with hotel quarantine, stating it "might be acceptable to the locals, but we know it might not be good enough in terms of attracting tourists and international business travellers". In contrast, a survey done by City University of Hong Kong of local citizens showed that a majority preferred the no hotel quarantine model of "0+7" rather than the "3+4" model of 3 days in hotel quarantine. Chan also admitted that Hong Kong had lost too many professionals, stating "We do acknowledge the loss of talent over the past half a year or more, but recently this is more worrying".

On 27 September 2022, Chan said that talent will come back and remain with the city's "0+3" isolation format, and that "Authorities will provide maximum room for resumption of business connections and international activities while not undermining the protection of citizens from disease."

On 17 October 2022, Chan said that the government has "been rationalising our anti-epidemic measures".

On 25 October 2022, Chan said that "We had been out of touch with the rest of the world because of Covid."

In February 2023, Chan took questions on a radio program, but most callers were fixated on the mask mandate, with one caller saying "It's very difficult to tell people and persuade [them] that we are a leading international centre when we are the last people on the planet to remove masks."

=== Budget and GDP growth ===
In February 2022, Chan projected the government's deficit for the year at HK$56.3 billion, and in September 2022, revised his projection upwards to HK$100 billion.

Chan said that the official government projection for 2022's GDP growth would be between -0.5% to 0.5%, however, from July to September, it fell 4.5% year over year with one economist saying that a 3% drop for all of 2022 would be possible. In November 2022, the government downgraded Chan's original projection to -3.2% for the year. Chan blamed "poor market conditions, shrinking corporate profits tax, relatively quiet stock and property markets, and less revenue from stamp duties."

In December 2022, Chan acknowledged that the government had to sustain "substantially large" anti-Covid costs. In January 2023, Chan said that more than HK$600 billion was spent on anti-pandemic policies in the past few years. Chan said that it was "more important to increase income" than cut expenses, but also said that the city would not implement a vacancy tax on empty apartments.

In February 2023, figures showed that GDP had fallen worse than expected in 2022, at -3.5%.

In February 2023, the deficit for 2022-2023 was revealed to be HK$140 billion, more than double the original estimate of HK$56.3 billion.

In February 2023, Chan also forecast a HK$54.4 billion deficit for 2023-2024, as well as GDP growth of 3.5% - 5.5%. In October 2023, Chan revised his estimate to a deficit of around HK$100 billion.

In early 2023, when announcing the new budget, Chan was asked by a lawmaker on why the budget did not include money for poverty reduction; Chan responded by saying "As a SAR official, I will not be intimidated. [Lawmakers] cannot use their vote of support or opposition to force me into doing something which I think would be inappropriate."

=== Singapore ===
In September 2022, the Global Financial Centres Index ranked Hong Kong in 4th place from its previous 3rd place, with Singapore taking 3rd place. On 10 October 2022, Chan defended Hong Kong, and said "But if you look at the content closely, Hong Kong's total score has actually increased by ten," but did not address Singapore's score increasing by 14 points. Chan criticized people who compared Singapore with Hong Kong, saying that those discussions "often relied on vague impressions".

In contrast, in October 2022, former government official Anthony Cheung Bing-leung pointed out how Singapore outperformed Hong Kong, saying that "With the fear of being criticized as "lying flat," Hong Kong lost the initiative in the competition with Singapore for full recovery" from COVID-19.

In March 2023, Chan said that Hong Kong was more fun than Singapore, and that "We are way more fun. We have natural mountains and tourists can also cross the border to the mainland."

In July 2024, Chan said that "When you contrast Hong Kong with Singapore, in terms of freedom, here is much better."

=== Financial Summit and personal COVID-19 infection ===
In March 2022, Chan announced the November 2022 Global Financial Leaders' Investment Summit. After several US lawmakers asked US-based financial executives to not attend the Summit, Chan said that the lawmakers has a "narrow mindset." RTHK reported that it was unclear if Chan could attend the Summit due to testing positive for COVID-19. On 31 October 2022, Chan, while in Saudi Arabia with COVID-19, said in an address to Hong Kong FinTech Week that "I would really love to join you in person, but obviously the Arabian hospitality is keeping me away." Chan also said that Hong Kong is "back in business" and "We're back!" while delivering a pre-recorded video to Hong Kong FinTech Week, though he was not able to attend the event in person due to him being unable to fly to Hong Kong until testing negative for COVID, due to Hong Kong's restrictions.

The Department of Health, in a press release issued at 11:57pm on 1 November 2022, said Chan was a "recovered case and was not contagious, and isolation was not required," but did not specify if Chan tested negative on his PCR test. The press release also stated that Chan will attend the Summit but "will not take part in meals," and did not specify the reason behind that if he had "recovered." On 2 November 2022, SCMP reported that Chan's PCR test was positive. There was no information in the report about Chief Executive John Lee's earlier pledge on 1 November 2022 that Chan would not be allowed any exemptions, and would have to isolate if he tested positive.

Later on 2 November 2022, the government denied that Chan was given any special treatment. In a press release, the government said that Chan "conducted a PCR test upon arrival at the HKIA yesterday and the result was positive with Ct value within the range of the above-mentioned recovered cases," but did not provide the numerical range of acceptable Ct values which would exempt one from isolation.

On 3 November 2022, Chan said that he did not benefit from any "double standards." In contrast, Hong Kong's leading microbiologist from the University of Hong Kong, Ho Pak-leung, criticized the government's inconsistency and said there was a "failing to comply with a unified standard" with regard to Chan's case.

=== Made in China ===
In December 2022, after the WTO ruled against the United States' requirement that products labelled "Made in Hong Kong" be instead labelled as "Made in China," Chan said the WTO ruling was necessary as a matter of principle.

=== Middle East ===
In January 2023, Chan traveled to Switzerland and began pitching Middle Eastern countries for investment in Hong Kong; Chan said there were "information gaps and perception issues" with Hong Kong.

=== Microelectronics Research and Development Institute ===
In February 2023, Chan announced that the government would fund the Microelectronics Research and Development Institute in Yuen Long, to become a "leading organisation for supporting microelectronics development in the Asia-Pacific region."

=== Happy Hong Kong ===
In April 2023, Chan announced the "Happy Hong Kong" program, and when asked about the effectiveness of the campaign, said it would be "pretty difficult to have a very well-defined numeric criteria to be established." Lawmaker Doreen Kong questioned the effectiveness of the campaign on helping the city's economy.

In September 2023, a survey found that the happiness level of Hongkongers had dropped to a 10-year low.

=== Future Fund ===
The government's "Future Fund" was established in 2016, to which journalist Gwyneth Ho said "In 2020, Financial Secretary Paul Chan began using the Future Fund... first to inject money into Cathay Pacific... it was supposed to be untouched for 10 years."

=== Strategic enterprises ===
In October 2023, Chan announced that 30 "strategic enterprises" would set up or expand their business in the city; local media reported that some of those companies had already long been established in Hong Kong, such as Lenovo and JD, which were publicly listed in the city's stock exchange.

== Current positions ==
Chan is the managing director of Paul Chan & Partners, Hong Kong Limited. He also serves as independent non-executive director for several Hong Kong listed companies.

On 3 July 2020, the Chinese official media, Xinhua news agent, stated that the Committee for Safeguarding National Security of the Hong Kong Special Administrative Region was formally established. There were 10 members of the committee. As the Financial Secretary of Hong Kong, Chan was a member of the committee.

== Personal life ==
Chan and his wife own 2 residential properties.

Chan is a voting member of the Hong Kong Jockey Club.

On 27 October 2022, Chan tested positive for COVID-19 while in Saudi Arabia.

Legislative Council of Hong Kong
Preceded by Mandy Tam	Member of Legislative Council; Representative for Accountancy; 2008–2012	Succeeded by Kenneth Leung
Political offices
Preceded by Mak Chai-kwong	Secretary for Development; 2012–2017	Succeeded by Eric Ma
Preceded by John Tsang	Financial Secretary of Hong Kong; 2017–present	Incumbent
Order of precedence
Preceded by Eric Chan; Chief Secretary for Administration	Hong Kong order of precedence Financial Secretary	Succeeded by Paul Lam; Secretary for Justice
