= Ronnie Wong =

Hong Kong politician and swimmer (born 1952)

Ronnie Wong Man-chiu, JP (Chinese: 王敏超, born 3 April 1952) is a Hong Kong politician, businessman and former Olympic swimmer.

== Biography ==
Wong was born into a wealthy shipping family. His father Wong Wah-sang founded Chung Wah Shipbuilding & Engineering Company. He graduated from the La Salle College and the Armstrong State University. He also obtained an MBA from the Florida Institute of Technology.

Wong was a member of the Hong Kong Basic Law Consultative Committee (BLCC). He joined the business and professional group of the BLCC but later split with it on the concept of the electoral methods of the future Chief Executive and the Legislative Council after 1997 and joined the pro-Beijing New Hong Kong Alliance which put forward an ultra-conservative proposal and later became chairman of the alliance.

In 1986, Wong was appointed to the Urban Council of Hong Kong and was re-appointed in 1991. In 1991, he ran with Winnie Cheung Wai-sun in the Island West constituency in the first Legislative Council direct election but was defeated by United Democrat candidates Yeung Sum and Huang Chen-ya. In 1995 Urban Council election, he won a seat in Ap Lei Chau by defeating Democratic Party's Andrew Cheng Kar-foo. In the 1998 Legislative Council election, he contested for the Urban Council constituency but was defeated by Ambrose Cheung Wing-sum. In 2000, he was appointed to the Southern District Council.

Wong was a swimming champion of Hong Kong. He represented Hong Kong in 2 Olympic Games and 3 Asian Games. He is the president of the Hong Kong Amateur Swimming Association. In the 2008 Beijing Olympic Games, he was one of the torchbearers in the Hong Kong Torch Relay.

He was also chairman of the Po Leung Kuk from 1985 to 1986.

== See also ==
- Peter Wong Man-kong, brother
