= Lung Sing (constituency) =

Constituency of the Wong Tai Sin District Council of Hong Kong

- 龍星
- Elected constituency for the Wong Tai Sin District Council
- Boundary of Lung Sing in Wong Tai Sin District
- District: Wong Tai Sin
- Legislative Council constituency: Kowloon Central
- Population: 19,166 (2019)
- Electorate: 12,414 (2019)

Current constituency
- Created: 2003
- Number of members: One
- Member: Mandy Tam (Independent)
- Created from: Diamond Hill

Lung Sing
- Traditional Chinese: 龍星
Transcriptions
Yue: Cantonese
- Yale Romanization: Lùhng sīng
- Jyutping: Lung4 sing1

Lung Sing, formerly called Diamond Hill, is one of the 25 constituencies in the Wong Tai Sin District in Hong Kong.

The constituency returns one district councillor to the Wong Tai Sin District Council, with an election every four years. The seat has been currently held by former legislator Mandy Tam, previously affiliated with The Frontier and the People Power.

Lung Sing constituency is loosely based on Diamond Hill area including Lung Poon Court, Galaxia, Bel Air Heights, Fung Chuen Court and Regent On The Hill. The estimated population in 2019 is 19,166.

== Councillors represented ==
=== Diamond Hill (1994–2003) ===
Election	Member	Party
1994	Choi Luk-sing	Independent (EKDRC)

=== Lung Sing (2003 to present) ===
Election	Member	Party
2003	Mandy Tam Heung-man	Independent
2006	Mandy Tam Heung-man	Civic
2007	Choi Luk-sing	Independent
2011	Mandy Tam Heung-man	Independent
2013	Mandy Tam Heung-man	People Power/Frontier
2016	Mandy Tam Heung-man	Frontier
2018	Mandy Tam Heung-man	Independent
2019	Mandy Tam Heung-man	Independent

== Election results ==
=== 2010s ===
Wong Tai Sin District Council Election, 2019: Lung Sing
Party	Candidate	Votes	%	±%
Ind. democrat	Tam Heung-man	6,098	65.77	+16.37
Independent	Ivan Mok Ka-kit	2,708	29.21	
Independent	Chan Chun-hung	336	3.62	
Independent	Ngok King-fun	130	1.40	−3.50
Majority		3,390	36.56	
Turnout		9,310	75.03	
Ind. democrat hold		Swing		

Wong Tai Sin District Council Election, 2015: Lung Sing
Party	Candidate	Votes	%	±%
Frontier	Tam Heung-man	2,974	49.4	+0.9
Nonpartisan	Joseph Lam Chok	2,640	43.8	
Independent	Ngok King-fun	297	4.9	
Nonpartisan	Ho Wai-kuen	111	1.8	
Majority		334	5.6	
Turnout		6,131	52.0	
Frontier hold		Swing		

Wong Tai Sin District Council Election, 2011: Lung Sing
Party	Candidate	Votes	%	±%
Independent	Tam Heung-man	2,862	48.5	+3.8
Independent	Choi Luk-sing	2,809	47.6	−1.0
Independent	Simon Chan Wai-sun	233	3.9	
Independent gain from Independent		Swing	+2.4	

=== 2000s ===
Wong Tai Sin District Council Election, 2007: Lung Sing
Party	Candidate	Votes	%	±%
Independent	Choi Luk-sing	2,654	48.6	+5.2
Civic	Tam Heung-man	2,444	44.7	−3.2
Independent	Lo Hoi-pang	366	3.7	
Independent gain from Civic		Swing	+4.2	

Wong Tai Sin District Council Election, 2003: Lung Sing
Party	Candidate	Votes	%	±%
Independent	Tam Heung-man	2,301	47.9	
Independent	Choi Luk-sing	2,086	43.4	−14.6
Independent	Lam Kwan-wai	278	5.8	
Independent	Alan Lai Wai-tong	141	2.9	
Independent gain from Independent		Swing		

=== 1990s ===
Wong Tai Sin District Council Election, 1999: Diamond Hill
Party	Candidate	Votes	%	±%
Independent	Choi Luk-sing	1,947	58.0	
Democratic	Manuel Chan Tim-shing	1,391	41.5	
Independent hold		Swing		

Wong Tai Sin District Board Election, 1994: Diamond Hill
Party	Candidate	Votes	%	±%
EKDRC	Choi Luk-sing	uncontested		
EKDRC win (new seat)				
