= Commercial (Second) =

Hong Kong functional constituency

Commercial (Second) 商界（第二）
- Functional constituency for the Legislative Council of Hong Kong
- Region: Hong Kong
- Electorate: 323

Current constituency
- Created: 1985
- Number of members: One
- Member: Andrew Yao (Independent)

The Commercial (Second) functional constituency (Chinese: 商界（第二）功能界別) is a functional constituency in the elections for the Legislative Council of Hong Kong first created in 1985. The constituency is composed of 421 corporates members of the Chinese General Chamber of Commerce entitled to vote at general meetings of the Chamber. The individual members were no longer eligible to vote after the 2021 electoral overhaul.

No actual election was held from its creation in 1985 through 2016, as all candidates were unopposed during that period. Two candidates contested each of the elections in 2021 and 2025.

== Return members ==
Election	Member	Party
1985	Ho Sai-chu	Independent
1988	Ho Sai-chu	Independent
1991	Philip Wong	NHKA
1995	Philip Wong	NHKA
Not represented in the PLC (1997–1998)
1998	Philip Wong	Independent
2000	Philip Wong	Independent
2004	Philip Wong	Independent
2008	Philip Wong	Independent
2012	Martin Liao	Independent
2016	Martin Liao	Independent
2021	Martin Liao	Independent
2025	Andrew Yao	Independent

== Electoral results ==
=== 2020s ===
2025 Legislative Council election: Commercial (Second)
Party	Candidate	Votes	%	±%
Independent	Andrew Yao Cho-fai	194	85.46	
Independent	Ivan Wong Siu-kei	33	14.54	
Majority		161	70.92	
Total valid votes		227	100.00	
Rejected ballots		84		
Turnout		239	73.99	−4.65
Registered electors		323		
Independent gain from Independent		Swing		

2021 Legislative Council election: Commercial (Second)
Party	Candidate	Votes	%	±%
Independent	Martin Liao Cheung-kong	176	71.26	
Independent	Yip Wing-shing	71	28.74	
Majority		105	42.52	
Total valid votes		247	100.00	
Rejected ballots		7		
Turnout		254	78.64	
Registered electors		421		
Independent hold		Swing		

=== 2010s ===
2016 Legislative Council election: Commercial (Second)
Party	Candidate	Votes	%	±%
Independent	Martin Liao Cheung-kong	Unopposed		
Registered electors		1,491		
Independent hold		Swing		

2012 Legislative Council election: Commercial (Second)
Party	Candidate	Votes	%	±%
Independent	Martin Liao Cheung-kong	Unopposed		
Registered electors		1,749		
Independent gain from Independent		Swing		

=== 2000s ===
2008 Legislative Council election: Commercial (Second)
Party	Candidate	Votes	%	±%
Independent	Philip Wong Yu-hong	Unopposed		
Registered electors		1,882		
Independent hold		Swing		

2004 Legislative Council election: Commercial (Second)
Party	Candidate	Votes	%	±%
Independent	Philip Wong Yu-hong	Unopposed		
Registered electors		1,835		
Independent hold		Swing		

2000 Legislative Council election: Commercial (Second)
Party	Candidate	Votes	%	±%
Independent	Philip Wong Yu-hong	Unopposed		
Registered electors		1,831		
Independent hold		Swing		

=== 1990s ===
1998 Legislative Council election: Commercial (Second)
Party	Candidate	Votes	%	±%
Independent	Philip Wong Yu-hong	Unopposed		
Registered electors		1,798		
Independent win (new seat)				

1995 Legislative Council election: Commercial (Second)
Party	Candidate	Votes	%	±%
NHKA	Philip Wong Yu-hong	Unopposed		
Registered electors		1,785		
NHKA hold		Swing		

1991 Legislative Council election: Second Commercial
Party	Candidate	Votes	%	±%
NHKA	Philip Wong Yu-hong	Unopposed		
Registered electors		2,348		
NHKA gain from Independent		Swing		

=== 1980s ===
1988 Legislative Council election: Second Commercial
Party	Candidate	Votes	%	±%
Independent	Ho Sai-chu	Unopposed		
Independent hold		Swing		

1985 Legislative Council election: Second Commercial
Party	Candidate	Votes	%	±%
Independent	Ho Sai-chu	Unopposed		
Independent win (new seat)				
