= Community Network Union =

Community Network Union 社區網絡聯盟
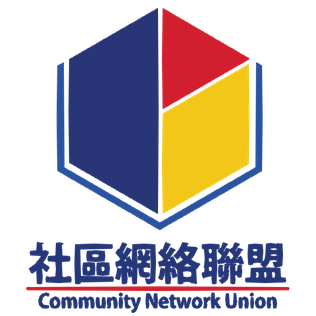
- Spokesperson: Ventus Lau
- Founded: 6 August 2017
- Ideology: Hong Kong localism
- Colours: Blue
- Legislative Council: 0 / 90
- District Councils: 0 / 470

Community Network Union (Cantonese: 社區網絡聯盟) is a political alliance consisting of three localist community-based political groups. It was formed in August 2017 with six community groups, including Sha Tin Community Network, Tuen Mun Community Network, Kwai Tsing Bonding, Tsuen Wan Community Network, Lam Tin Community Network and Tin Shui Wai Community Network, in hopes of winning 15 seats in 2019 District Council election.

After its spokesman Ventus Lau, also the president of the Sha Tin Community Network, was barred from running in the March 2018 Legislative Council by-elections for his perceived "pro-Hong Kong independence" stance, three of the members of the alliance, Kwai Tsing Bonding, Tsuen Wan Community Network and Tuen Mun Community Network quit the alliance in February 2018.

== Membership ==
- Kwai Tsing Bonding (quit in 2018)
- Lam Tin Community Network
- Sha Tin Community Network
- Tin Shui Wai Community Network
- Tsuen Wan Community Network (quit in 2018)
- Tuen Mun Community Network (quit in 2018)
