= Kenneth Leung =

Hong Kong politician

- 梁繼昌
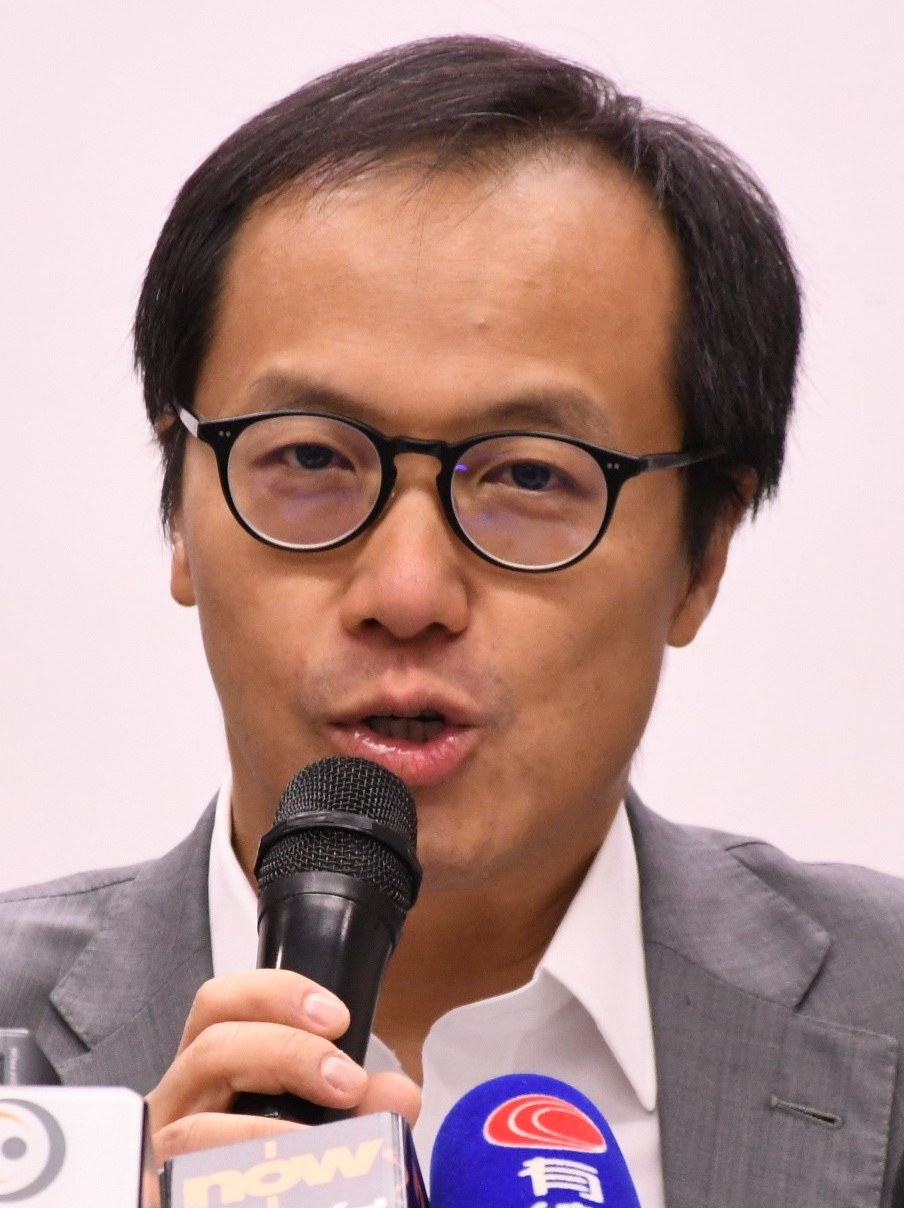

Member of the Legislative Council
- In office 1 October 2012 – 11 November 2020
- Preceded by: Paul Chan
- Succeeded by: Edmund Wong (2022)
- Constituency: Accountancy

Personal details
- Born: 17 October 1962 (age 64) Hong Kong
- Party: Professional Commons
- Education: Hong Kong Polytechnic (PD); London School of Economics (BSc, LLM); Queen's College
- Occupation: Tax Consultant; Accountant

Kenneth Leung Kai-cheong (Chinese: 梁繼昌; born 17 October 1962) is a Hong Kong politician formerly serving as a member of the Legislative Council for the Accountancy functional constituency. Professionally, he is a tax adviser and accountant. On 11 November 2020, he was disqualified from the Legislative Council, along with three other lawmakers of the pan-democratic camp, by the central government in Beijing on request of the Hong Kong government. A mass resignation of pan-democrats the same day left the Legislative Council without a substantial opposition.

== Education and background ==
Leung was born in Hong Kong and attended Queen's College. After taking a diploma in accountancy at Hong Kong Polytechnic University, he went on to study at the London School of Economics and Political Science, from where he obtained a bachelor's degree in economics and an LL.M. degree. He has been working as a senior tax consultant.

== Political career ==
Leung is considered a moderate in the pan-democratic camp. His first electoral successes were in the accountancy sub-sector of the Election Committee for the Chief Executive. In a 2005 by-election he secured a seat, which he defended the following year.

In the 2012 LegCo election he won in the Accountancy constituency, securing 47% of the vote, and held the seat for two terms until 2020. He was a member of the Professionals Guild, a group of pro-democratic lawmakers in the Legislative Council, at the time of his disqualification in 2020.

=== 2019–20 Hong Kong protests ===
On 23 August 2019, during the 2019–20 Hong Kong protests, Leung led a protest of accountants against the extradition bill. Leung stated that a particular concern of the bill to accountants came from their need to frequently cross the border to mainland China. He called for the protests in the central business district to be "civilized and calm".

In November 2019, Leung requested the government to disclose the composition of the tear gas used by police in the protests, and to issue more guidelines regarding tear gas residue. Health Secretary Sophia Chan refused the first of these requests, citing operational concerns, and said that there was no evidence of tear gas leading to contamination by dioxines or dioxin poisoning.

=== Disqualification in 2020 election ===
Five weeks ahead of the later postponed 2020 Hong Kong Legislative Council Election, on 30 July, the government stated that Leung was among a dozen pro-democracy candidates whose nominations were 'invalid', under an opaque process in which, nominally, civil servants – returning officers – assess whether, for instance, a candidate had objected to the enactment of the national security law, or was sincere in statements made disavowing separatism. The election officials' main justification for the disqualification of Leung had been his participation in a March 2020 visit to the United States to discuss Hong Kong-United States relations. Leung's appeal against the decision was unsuccessful, even though the discussion had included politicians from the pro-Beijing DAB; the government argued that by not having opposed sanctions during the trip or at a conference that was held afterwards, he had played a "supportive" role in the call for sanctions. In a December 2020 interview, Leung said he disagreed with the sanctions that the United States had imposed on the city.

On 11 November 2020, following a decision of the Standing Committee of the National People's Congress he was disqualified from Legislative Council along with three other lawmakers; this resulted in the resignation of a further 15 pro-democracy lawmakers.

=== Controversies ===
In 2013, Leung was one of eight legislators treated by Cathay Pacific to a six-day trip to France to tour Airbus factories. In response to the public outcry and the perception of a conflict of interest, Leung stated that he would donate HK$100,000 to UNICEF, but refused to apologise.

In March 2017, Kenneth Leung was sued by CY Leung, the Chief Executive of Hong Kong, for alleged defamation. Kenneth Leung has made remarks about the $50 million payment that CY Leung received from an Australian firm in 2011 for signing a non-compete agreement, claiming that CY Leung was under investigation by overseas tax authorities for that payment, which CY Leung denied. According to the SCMP, Kenneth Leung said that the lawsuit "would not stop him from continuing with a Legislative Council investigation into the payment controversy".

== Personal life ==
Leung is married.

Legislative Council of Hong Kong
Preceded by Paul Chan	Member of Legislative Council; Representative for Accountancy; 2012–2020	Succeeded by Edmund Wong
