= Alvin Cheng =

Alvin Cheng Kam-mun
- 鄭錦滿
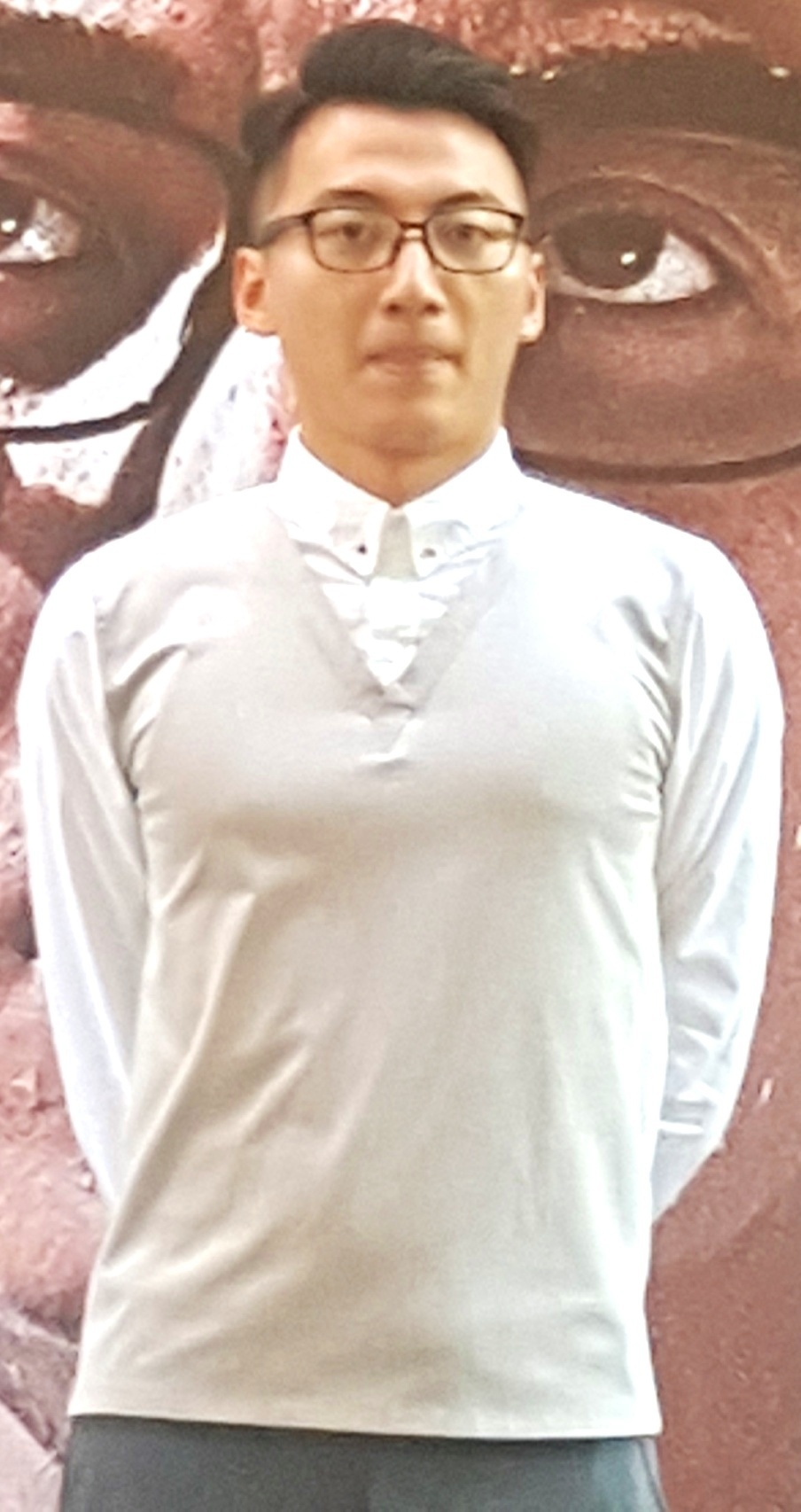

Vice-chairman of Civic Passion
- Incumbent
- Assumed office 14 September 2016

Personal details
- Born: 23 June 1988 (age 38) Chaozhou, Guangdong, China
- Party: Civic Passion
- Education: Queensland University of Technology
- Known for: Umbrella Movement
- Nickname(s): Alvin, "4 Eyes Brother"

Alvin Cheng
- Traditional Chinese: 鄭錦滿
Transcriptions
Standard Mandarin
- Hanyu Pinyin: Zhèng Jǐnmǎn
Yue: Cantonese
- Yale Romanization: Jehng Gám Múhn
- Jyutping: Zeng^{6} Gam^{2} Mun^{5}

Alvin Cheng Kam-mun (Chinese: 鄭錦滿, born 23 June 1988), also known as "Brother Four Eyes" (Chinese: 四眼哥哥), is a Hong Kong political activist, a member of Civic Passion, and founder of student activist organization Student Front. In 2014, he led a rally in support of the Hong Kong Umbrella Movement during the G20 Brisbane summit.

== Political career ==
On 22 September 2014, in response to the arrest of student protesters in the Hong Kong Umbrella Movement Cheng returned home from his studies at Queensland University of Technology to participate in the protest.

In November 2014, Cheng went back to Brisbane to lead a rally in support for the Umbrella Movement during the 2014 G20 Brisbane summit. On the 16th, the four-hour rally on a lawn outside the summit venue attracted participation by many overseas students from Hong Kong, Taiwan and Mainland China.

On 6 December 2014, Cheng established Student Front, a student activist organization to fight against the "stage power" and to remain at the frontlines after the Hong Kong Federation of Students and Scholarism quit the protests. He was arrested on suspicion of attending, and inciting others to take part in, an illegal assembly. He wrote an article that indicated he was arrested on 26 December 2014 and not granted bail. After the Umbrella Movement, Cheng continued with numerous protest activities, such as gau wu and the movement against parallel trading. He was arrested on several occasions and found it difficult to obtain bail. He was then banned from entering Mong Kok by a court order.

On 2 March 2015, Cheng announced that Student Front was dissolved and warned other activists not to depend completely on "student activism organizations". On the morning of 27 April 2015, Cheng was involved in a dispute with supporters of Avery Ng, the vice-chairman of the League of Social Democrats, outside Mong Kok Police Station regarding the progress of the Umbrella Movement.

On 20 August 2015, Cheng was convicted of obstructing bailiff officers from clearing occupied roads in Mong Kok on 26 November 2014, and sentenced to 21 days' detention.

On 20 November 2019, Cheng was arrested by Hong Kong police when he tried to escape from the siege of the Hong Kong Polytechnic University. He was eventually convicted for taking part in a riot, and sentenced to 3 years and 8 months in prison on 11 February 2023.

=== Disqualification in 2020 Legco election ===
Five weeks ahead of the (subsequently postponed) 2020 Hong Kong Legislative Council Election, on 30 July 2020, as Cheng preparted to stand, the government stated that he was among a dozen pro-democracy candidates whose nominations were 'invalid', under an opaque process in which, nominally, civil servants – returning officers – assess whether, for instance, a candidate had objected to the enactment of the national security law, or was sincere in statements made disavowing separatism.

== See also ==
- Umbrella Movement
- Localist camp
- Hong Kong Autonomy Movement
