= Shatin Community Network =

Shatin Community Network 沙田社區網絡
- President: Ventus Lau
- Ideology: Conservatism (HK); Localism (HK)
- Regional affiliation: Community Network; Union
- Colours: Blue
- Legislative Council: 0 / 90
- District Councils: 0 / 470

Shatin Community Network
- Traditional Chinese: 沙田社區網絡
Transcriptions
Yue: Cantonese
- Yale Romanization: Sātìhn séhkēui móhnglok
- Jyutping: Saa^{1}tin^{4} se^{5}keoi^{1} mong^{5}lok^{3}

The Shatin Community Network (Chinese: 沙田社區網絡) is a localist political group in Hong Kong. It was formed by a group of Sha Tin residents and former member of the Chinese University of Hong Kong Local Society was inspired by 2014 Occupy protests. It uses "pragmatism, locality and democracy" and aimed to win back the District Councils from the pro-Beijing camp. It won a seat in the 2015 Hong Kong district council elections.

== Electoral performance ==
=== District Council elections ===
| Election | Number of popular votes | % of popular votes | Total elected seats | +/− |
|---|---|---|---|---|
| 2015 | 3,718 | 0.26 | 1 / 431 | 1 ▲ |

== See also ==
- Kowloon East Community
- Youngspiration
