= Peter Wong Hong-yuen =

Hong Kong politician

Peter Wong Hong-yuen 黃匡源 GBS, OBE, JP

Member of the Legislative Council
- In office 12 October 1988 – 31 July 1995
- Preceded by: New constituency
- Succeeded by: Eric Li
- Constituency: Accountancy

Personal details
- Born: 25 April 1944 (age 82) Shanghai, China
- Party: Liberal Party, New Hong Kong Alliance, Liberal Democratic Federation, Business and Professionals Federation
- Spouse: Wendy
- Relations: Great grandfather: Wong Ah Fook
- Children: 2
- Education: Cambridge University (BA, MA)
- Occupation: Accountant

Peter Wong Hong-yuen, GBS, OBE, JP (born 25 April 1944, Shanghai) was a member of the Legislative Council of Hong Kong (1988–95).

He was President of the Hong Kong Society of Accountants from 1984 to 1985 and was elected Legislative Councillor to represent the accountancy functional constituency from 1988 to 1995.

Wong is a member of the Hong Kong Freemasonry headquartered in the 'Zetland Hall', he was a partner of Deloitte Touche Tohmatsu.

Peter graduated from Cambridge University in 1965, and after qualifying as a Chartered Accountant, he joined his father's accounting firm Wong Tan & Co. which became Kwan Wong Tan and Fong (“KWTF”). In 1997, KWTF merged into Deloitte Touche Tohmatsu of which Peter was senior tax partner until his retirement in 2004.

His father 黃秉章 was a founding partner of "Kwan Wong Tan & Fong", which was the largest local accounting firm in Hong Kong prior to its merger with Deloitte Touche Tohmatsu in 1997. His father was also Chairman of 'The Chinese Club' from 1968 to 1971.

Wong's grandfather 黃兆鎮 (a.k.a.黃子靜) is the son of Wong Ah Fook

Wong's grandfather's older brother 黃兆焜 (S.K. Wong)'s son Maurice Wong was a partner at the "Deacons" law firm in Hong Kong.

Peter is the Hong Kong Chairman of Landmark Trust Group and The ISF Academy.
