= New Hong Kong Alliance =

New Hong Kong Alliance 新香港聯盟
- Chairman: Wai Kee-shun
- Secretary: Lo Tak-shing; Kan Fook-yee
- Founded: 1 May 1989; 37 years ago
- Dissolved: 1999; 27 years ago
- Ideology: Chinese nationalism Ultraconservatism (HK); Economic liberalism
- Political position: Right-wing to far-right
- Regional affiliation: Pro-Beijing camp
- Colors: Red

The New Hong Kong Alliance (NHKA; Chinese: 新香港聯盟, abbreviated 新港盟) was a pro-Beijing conservative political organisation in Hong Kong in the 1990s mostly composed of businessmen and professionals. It was considered the more conservative wing of the Group of 89 formed by established elites in the debate of drafting the Hong Kong Basic Law and democratisation. It proposed the ultra-conservative Bicameral Model for the future political structure. The alliance's key person was secretary Lo Tak-shing who had an eye on the Chief Executive post after 1997, the alliance became less active as Lo's chance of contesting the post got slimmer and it ceased to exist in 1999.

== History ==
It was founded by the minority wing of the Group of 89, the conservative faction in the Hong Kong Basic Law Drafting Committee (BLDC) and Consultative Committee (BLCC), as well as Legislative Council members, District Board members, civil servants, and members from the Progressive Hong Kong Society (PHKS) but its leader, Maria Tam Wai-chu did not join the alliance due to its incompatibility of the alliance's aim at influencing government policies and her own role as Executive Council member, though she was still involved in it informally.

Led by Lo Tak-shing, the former Executive Council and Legislative Council member and subsequently the chairman of the BLCC Standing Committee, the alliance's general committee had 32 members, 21 were from the Group of 89 and 10 from the PHKS, and at least 6 belonged to both Group of 89 and the PHKS. Core founding members included Raymond Wu Wai-yung, Maria Tam Wai-chu, Kan Fook-yee, Chan Wing-kee, Lee Jung-kong, Veronica Cha, Philip Kwok Chi-kuen and Peter Wong Hong-yuen, and was supported by Lo's cousin Henry Litton, Tso Wung-wai, Elsie Leung and the later Chief Executive Leung Chun-ying. Lo Tak-shing was elected honorary secretary, Legislative Council member Peter Wong as treasurer, Veronica Wu and Raymond Wu as press secretaries and Urban Council member Pao Ping-wing as recruitment officer.

For the future political structure of the Hong Kong Special Administrative Region after 1997 during the drafting of the Basic Law, the alliance proposed a political structure which was considered ultra-conservative called the Bicameral Model, in which only 25 of the Legislative Council members would be directly elected before 2005. Each chamber in the bicameral structure would have the veto power vis-a-vis the other. The Chief Executive would not be directly elected before 2005. The Bicameral Model caused head-to head confrontation of the supporters of the compromised "4-4-2 Model" which was supported by members of the Group of 89 such as Vincent Lo Hong-shui. Lo Tak-shing and other four alliance members tried to block the adoption of the "4-4-2 Model" which led to some key alliance members from the party, such as Peter Wong, James Tien, William Fung, Chan Wing-kee, Raymond Wu, Veronica Wu, Philip Kwok to quit the alliance in early 1990.

The alliance won one seat in the 1991 election of the Legislative Council of Hong Kong, Philip Wong in the Commercial (Second) functional constituency. Ronnie Wong Man-chiu and Winnie Cheung Wai-sun contested the Island West constituency on a joint-ticket but were beaten by the United Democrats team of Yeung Sum and Huang Chen-ya. Another Legislative Councillor of the alliance was Howard Young, who was also member of the Liberal Party and the Liberal Democratic Federation of Hong Kong.

The alliance opposed to the last Governor Chris Patten's constitutional reform of the functional constituency enlargement in 1992, thought that it would damage the Sino-British relations and the stability of Hong Kong before the handover in 1997. It was strongly present in the Preparatory Committee hand-picked by Beijing for the establishment of the SAR running up to 1997 and subsequently the Provisional Legislative Council.

Lo Tak-shing, who had been widely perceived as the potential candidate in the first Chief Executive election in 1996 for the highest office in the post-1997 SAR government. As Lo's chance of contesting the post got slimmer in 1996, the Alliance became less active. It was eventually dissolved in 1999.

== Election results ==
=== Legislative Council elections ===
Election	Number of popular votes	% of popular votes	GC seats	FC seats	EC seats	Total seats	+/−
1991	11,934	0,87	0	1	—	1 / 60	1▲
1995	–	–	0	1	0	1 / 60	0

=== Municipal elections ===
Election	Number of popular votes	% of popular votes	UrbCo seats	RegCo seats	Total elected seats
1995	4,901	0.88	1 / 32	0 / 27	1 / 59

== See also ==
- Politics of Hong Kong
- List of political parties in Hong Kong
