= Ventus Lau =

Hong Kong politician (born 1993)

- 劉頴匡
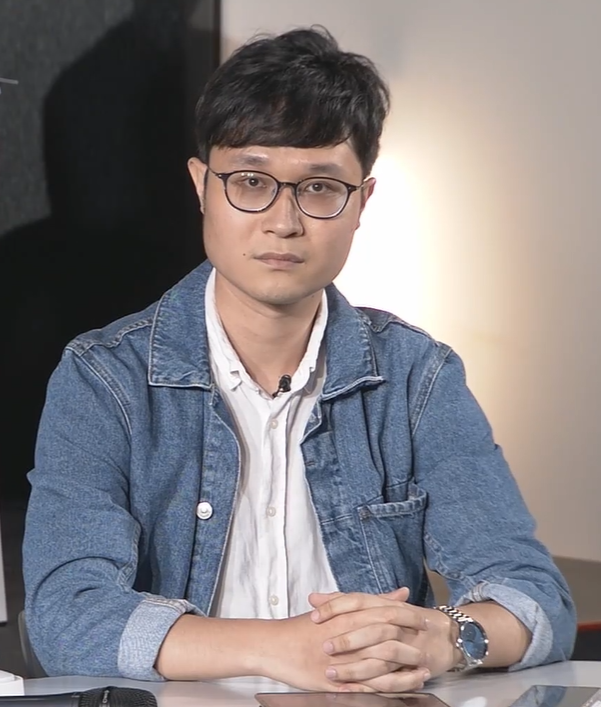
- Lau at the 2020 Hong Kong pro-democracy primaries
- Born: Lau Wing-hong; 8 October 1993 (age 32); Hong Kong
- Education: Chinese University of Hong Kong (no degree); Hong Kong Metropolitan University (BA)
- Occupation: Politician
- Years active: 2014–present

Ventus Lau Wing-hong (Chinese: 劉頴匡; born 8 October 1993) is a Hong Kong politician. He is the convenor of the Shatin Community Network and the founding convenor of the Community Network Union, an alliance of the localist community groups in different districts. He came to media attention in the 2018 New Territories East by-election and his candidacy was disqualified by the returning officer for his previous pro-Hong Kong independence stance. For his participation in the 2020 Hong Kong pro-democracy primaries he was part of a mass arrest on national security charges in January 2021 and remains in jail as of October 2021.

== Biography ==
Lau first participated in politics on the invitation of his secondary school teacher Tam Hoi-pong to join the pro-democracy Neo Democrats in early 2014. He became a community officer of Pok Hong in Sha Tin. Scoring six As and three Bs in the Hong Kong Certificate of Education Examination, Lau was admitted to the Chinese University of Hong Kong through the Early Admissions Scheme, where he majored in Chinese language and literature at S.H. Ho College. During his study at CUHK, he established the CUHK Local Society in 2014, aiming to disaffiliate the Chinese University Students' Union from the Hong Kong Federation of Students (HKFS) after the 2014 Hong Kong protests, in which the radical localists held the HKFS responsible for the failure of the movement. He did not complete his degree at CUHK due to his active involvement in social movements.

Lau quit Neo Democrats over the dispute of the disaffiliating campaign as the Neo Democrats supported the unity of the HKFS, as well as the "Liberation" street actions launched by the militant localists such as Civic Passion and Hong Kong Indigenous targeting mainland parallel traders. He formed the Shatin Community Network and continued his community services in the district. In the 2015 District Council elections, the group won a seat in Chung Tin. In August 2017, the Shatin Community Network co-founded the Community Network Union, an alliance of the six localist community groups in different districts, in which Lau became the convenor of the union.

Lau declared his candidacy in the 2018 New Territories East by-election, a seat left vacant by localist Baggio Leung of Youngspiration over the oath-taking controversy. He claimed to have received Leung's endorsement and did not participate in the primary organised by the pro-democracy camp. He also declared that he no longer supports Hong Kong independence. He also resigned as the convenor of the Community Network Union and ran as an independent localist. After the end of the nomination period, Lau's candidacy was disqualified by the returning officer on the basis of his previous support for the idea of Hong Kong independence.

On 19 January 2020, Lau led a rally at Chater Garden to call for electoral reforms and a boycott of the Chinese Communist Party. Violence erupted when protesters began assaulting police officers at the scene. In response, the police fired tear gas to disperse the protesters. After speaking to reporters, Lau was arrested by authorities. The police spokesman said that the police liaison officers, who were injured, had maintained close contact with the organisers and said that Lau's characterisation of them as "suspected plainclothes" to the press was "ridiculous and irresponsible" as the organisers had been acquainted with them. He further stated that Lau was arrested on the charges of obstructing police officers and violating the conditions outlined in the letter of no objection for the rally. The police also accused Lau of lying and inciting the crowd, because he claimed that he did not know the police liaison officers when they approached him during the ongoing rally, which would then lead to a crowd forming around them and the officers getting assaulted by the protesters.

=== Disqualification for 2020 Legco election ===
Lau sought to stand in the (later postponed) 2020 Hong Kong Legislative Council Election but on 30 July, five weeks ahead of the designated poll date, the government stated that he was among a dozen pro-democracy candidates whose nominations were 'invalid', under an opaque process in which, nominally, civil servants – returning officers – assess whether, for instance, a candidate had objected to the enactment of the national security law, or was sincere in statements made disavowing separatism.

=== Arrest ===
On 6 January 2021, Lau was among 53 members of the pro-democratic camp who were arrested under the national security law, specifically its provision regarding alleged subversion. The group stood accused of the organisation of and participation in unofficial primary elections held by the camp in July 2020. Lau was released on bail on 7 January but returned to prison in February 2021.

In August 2022, Lau pleaded guilty to violating the national security law, and remains in prison awaiting sentencing. On 16 March 2024, Lau was sentenced to 54 months and 20 days in prison for rioting over his participation in the 2019 Storming of the Legislative Council Complex. He had pleaded guilty.

In June 2026, Lau graduated with a Bachelor of Arts in Language Studies and Translation with first class honours from Hong Kong Metropolitan University while serving his prison sentence.

== Personal life ==
As of June 2026, Lau is in a relationship with feminist activist Emilia Wong. They met in 2014 through S.H. Ho College's collegiate debate team, which Lau co-founded, and began dating later that year.
