= Kan Fook-yee =

Kan Fook-yee GBS
- 簡福飴

Member of the Provisional Legislative Council
- In office 21 December 1996 – 30 June 1998

Personal details
- Born: 14 June 1936 (age 89) Hong Kong
- Party: New Hong Kong Alliance; Federation for the Stability of Hong Kong
- Children: 4
- Occupation: Surveyor

Kan Fook-yee, GBS (born 14 June 1936, Hong Kong) was the member of the Provisional Legislative Council. He is a member of the Hong Kong Institute of Surveyors, fellow of the Chartered Institute of Arbitrators and Royal Institution of Charter Surveyors. He joined the Hong Kong Basic Law Consultative Committee in the 1980s and the Preparatory Committee for the Hong Kong Special Administrative Region in the 1990s. He was also the senior partner of the Knight Frank (HK).

Legislative Council of Hong Kong
New parliament	Member of Provisional Legislative Council; 1997–1998	Replaced by Legislative Council
