= Philip Wong =

Hong Kong businessman and politician (1938–2021)

Philip Wong Yu-hong GBS
- 黃宜弘
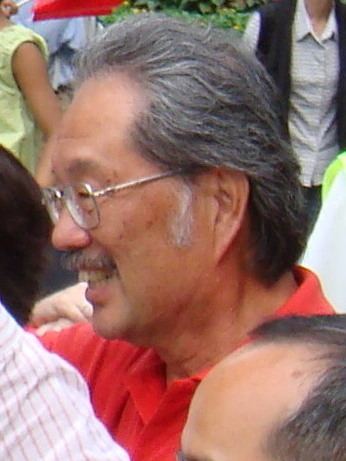
- Wong in 2008

Member of the Legislative Council of Hong Kong
- In office 9 October 1991 – 30 June 1997
- Preceded by: New constituency
- Succeeded by: Replaced by Provisional Legislative Council
- Constituency: Commercial (Second)
- In office 21 December 1996 – 30 June 1998 (Provisional Legislative Council)
- In office 1 July 1998 – 30 September 2012
- Preceded by: New parliament
- Succeeded by: Martin Liao
- Constituency: Commercial (Second)

Personal details
- Born: 23 December 1938 Quanzhou, Fujian, China
- Died: 6 June 2021 (aged 82) United States
- Party: New Hong Kong Alliance (1990s)
- Spouse(s): Josephine Tan (divorced); Anita Maria Leung Fung-yee
- Children: Ian Joseph Wong; Kirk Landon Wong; Mark Nathan Wong
- Parent: Wong Ker-lee (father)
- Education: University of California, Berkeley (M.Sc.); Southland University (J.D.); California Coast University (Ph.D.)
- Occupation: Businessman

Philip Wong Yu-hong, GBS (Chinese: 黃宜弘; Pe̍h-ōe-jī: N̂g Gî-hông; 23 December 1938 – 6 June 2021) was a politician in Hong Kong who served as a member of the legislative council (Functional constituencies, Commercial [Second]), a deputy to the National People's Congress and vice-chairman of the Chinese General Chamber of Commerce in Hong Kong. He was also a recipient of the Gold Bauhinia Star award.

== Criticism ==
=== Academic credentials ===
On the Legislative council website, Wong was listed to have an M.Sc. degree from the University of California, Berkeley, a Ph.D. degree in engineering from the California Coast University, and a J.D. degree from Southland University.

Share market analyst and Hong Kong activist, David Webb, requested an investigation be launched to check for his possible improper academic credentials. Nothing has come from Webb's request.

The University of California credentials passed muster as well as California Coast University's. California Coast University's bulletin states that it "does not require formal, on-campus residence or classroom attendance" because it is an online-only school accredited by the DEAC. Wong did receive the engineering degree from California Coast University on 27 August 1984, nearly 21 years before the CCU was accredited by the DEAC in January, 2005 (and the PhD programs were dropped as a condition of the school's accreditation); however, California Coast University had full state approval of all academic programs from the State of California which made the degrees legal and academically legitimate nearly everywhere in the world. Southland University is no longer in existence.

=== Middle finger incident ===
During the July 2003 Article 23 march, Wong was filmed to be giving demonstrators the middle finger gesture. Hong Kong Canadian politician Albert Cheng asked in a meeting in October 2004 whether his middle finger gesture has been referred to a committee for consideration. Jasper Tsang, a colleague of Wong, replied that Wong had already apologised the previous day.

== Death ==
On 6 June 2021, Wong died at the age of 82 after a six-month battle with brain cancer in a hospital in the United States. A memorial was held at AL Moore-Grimshaw Mortuaries Bethany Chapel in Phoenix, Arizona.

Legislative Council of Hong Kong
Preceded by Ho Sai-chu	Member of Legislative Council; Representative for Commercial (Second); 1991–1997	Replaced by Provisional Legislative Council
New parliament	Member of Provisional Legislative Council; 1997–1998	Replaced by Legislative Council
New parliament	Member of Legislative Council; Representative for Commercial (Second); 1998–2012	Succeeded by Martin Liao
Preceded by Ronald Arculli	Chairman of Finance Committee; 2000–2004	Succeeded by Emily Lau
