= Lo Tak-shing =

Lo Tak-shing CBE GBM JP
- 羅德丞

Unofficial Member of the Executive Council of Hong Kong
- In office 1980–1985

Member of the Legislative Council of Hong Kong
- In office 1974–1985
- Constituency: Appointed

Personal details
- Born: 23 January 1935 British Hong Kong
- Died: 11 December 2006 (aged 71) Hong Kong
- Resting place: Chiu Yuen Cemetery
- Party: New Hong Kong Alliance (1989-99)
- Parent: Lo Man-kam (father)
- Occupation: Solicitor

Lo Tak-shing CBE GBM JP (traditional Chinese: 羅德丞; simplified Chinese: 罗德丞, 23 January 1935 – 11 December 2006), also known as T. S. Lo, was a former president of The Law Society of Hong Kong, unofficial member of the Executive Council of Hong Kong, and member of the Legislative Council of Hong Kong. He was the first person to announce his intention to run for the new post of Chief Executive of Hong Kong in May 1996. However, he abandoned his bid in October 1996 to lobby for his allies, Simon Li Fook-sean, deputy director of the preliminary working committee of the preparatory committee who was running against Oriental Overseas boss Tung Chee-hwa (who eventually won the post), former Chief Justice Yang Ti-liang, Wharf chairman Peter Woo Kwong-ching and the chief shareholder Mu-sang Du Ching Lung Hua.

== Biography ==
Lo was born on 23 January 1935. He was the youngest of six, with four sisters and a brother (who died at an early age). His father, Lo Man-kam, was a practicing lawyer. His mother, Victoria (何錦姿), was the eldest daughter of Robert Hotung. Lo was admitted to Canton's Lingnan Primary School, Hong Kong's Lingnan Secondary School and Queen's College. He later attended Wadham College, Oxford and was awarded the Master of Jurisprudence and J.D.

=== Public career ===
1960 after returning from school, Lo joined Lo & Lo Solicitors as a senior partner, and later at Henderson and the Swire Group as a Director and Vice-Chairman and Director. From 1969 to 1971, Lo worked in the public sector. From 1970 to 1974, he was City Council Member; from 1974 to 1985, he was an appointed Legislative Council Member; from 1980 to 1985, he was also a member of the Executive Council. He also served as Chairman of the Transport Advisory Committee and opposed the construction of the then Hong Kong MTR backbone. Lo resigned from the Executive and Legislative Councils in Hong Kong over his dissatisfaction during the negotiations with the British. He later funded the establishment of an entity to help immigrants.

=== License plate auctions ===
During 1973, Lo, as the Chairman of the Transport Advisory Committee Chairman to Governor Sir Murray MacLehose, recommended the implementation of a special license plate auction system. The system provided for the auction of a license plate upon the license plate holder's death, with the proceeds to be returned to the government and allocated for charitable purposes. The government accepted the proposals and then in the same year in May, Hong Kong held its first license plate auctions. Since 1908, the British government in Hong Kong had been issuing license plates to senior officials. Lo had a license plate with number 18 which was bought at an auction in February 2008 for a record amount by businessman Zhang Chengguang.

=== Political career ===
In 1986, Lo was appointed deputy director of the Hong Kong Basic Law Consultative Committee. In 1992, he was appointed a Hong Kong Affairs Adviser. He later became a Special Administrative Region Preparatory Committee member and the member of the Ninth and Tenth CPPCC National Committees.

In 1989, the Lo Tak Shing Group of the party set up the New Hong Kong Alliance, and he appointed himself as the Honorary Secretary General. The group proposed the "one council, two chamber" program, in which the "group voting" mechanism agreed to write "Basic Law". During the transfer of sovereignty of Hong Kong, he participated with the SAR Government Commission on Strategic Development to discuss the "bicameral system" predecessor. In November 1989, he met Chinese Premier Li Peng; the following February he met Jiang Zemin in Zhongnanhai. During the first direct elections in Hong Kong of the 1991 Legislative Council, Zhang Huishen (the twin sister of Lo's wife Zhang Huiyu) ran in a local election in the Southern District, but lost because of lack of local experience. In 1992, with the Chinese State Council's support, Lo Tak Shing founded the "Window of Hong Kong," an English-language weekly.

In 1995, Lo was the first to give up a British passport and obtain a PRC passport. Since Hong Kong residents can not easily apply for a Chinese passport, the media questioned the "back door" processes to obtain such passports for the well-connected.

=== Death ===
In October 2006 Lo suffered a heart attack, and on 11 December died at the age of 71 years at the Queen Mary Hospital. On 14 December 2006 he was buried in the Ho Tung family plot at Chiu Yuen Cemetery.

=== Family ===
Lo was of Chinese and European descent. His hobbies included smoking, and playing bridge and mahjong. He represented Hong Kong in international bridge tournaments. Lo was married three times. His first wife was Tamara Federova, his second wife was Su Jingwen, and his third wife was Zhang Huiyu (granddaughter of a wealthy businessman, Cheung Chuk Shan). Lo was survived by two sons and two daughters.

== Honors ==
- JP (26 June 1970)
- OBE (1976)
- CBE (1982)
- Grand Bauhinia Medal (1997)
- LL.D. (Hon, Lingnan University) (12 December 2005)
