= Hong Kong Basic Law Drafting Committee =

1985 committee of National People's Congress, China

- Traditional Chinese: 香港特別行政區基本法起草委員會
- Simplified Chinese: 香港特别行政区基本法起草委员会
Transcriptions
Standard Mandarin
- Hanyu Pinyin: Xiānggǎng tèbié xíngzhèngqū jīběnfǎ qǐcǎo wěiyuánhuì
Yue: Cantonese
- Yale Romanization: Hēung góng dahk biht hàhng jing kēui gēi bún faat héi chóu wái yùhn wuih
- Jyutping: Hoeng^{1} gong^{2} dak^{6} bit^{6} hang^{4} zing^{3} keoi^{1} gei^{1} bun^{2} faat^{3} hei^{2} cou^{2} wai^{2} jyun^{4} wui^{6}

The Hong Kong Special Administrative Region Basic Law Drafting Committee (BLDC) was formed in June 1985 for the drafts of the Hong Kong Basic Law for the Hong Kong Special Administrative Region (HKSAR) after 1997. It was formed as a working group under the National People's Congress. The Drafting Committee had 59 members, of whom 23 were from Hong Kong and 36 were from Mainland, mostly the PRC government officials. The Drafting Committee was dominated by Hong Kong businessmen with a share from different social sectors. The decisions of the Drafting Committee on the political structure and legal system of the HKSAR had a great impact on the politics of Hong Kong today.

== Formation ==
The creation of the BLDC was announced in Beijing in June 1985 as a working group under the National People's Congress (NPC) of the People's Republic of China. The BLDC was appointed by and reported to the NPC. It had a total of 59 members, 36 from the mainland China and 23 from Hong Kong. Apparently the original figure of 60 was not reached as one of the pro-Taiwan person refused to sit on the committee. The criteria for the Mainland members should be familiar with Hong Kong and some should be legal and constitutional experts, and the Hong Kong members should be patriotic, familiar with the situation of Hong Kong, and should have professional knowledge of particular sector.

The chairman of the drafting committee was Ji Pengfei, the 8 vice-chairmen were Xu Jiatun, director of the New China News Agency Hong Kong Branch; Wang Hanbin, secretary general of the NPC; Hu Sheng, director of the Party Research Centre of the Central Committee of the Chinese Communist Party; Fei Xiaotong, prominent Chinese anthropologist and sociologist; T. K. Ann, Hong Kong industrialist and member of the Chinese People's Political Consultative Conference; Y. K. Pao, Hong Kong shipping tycoon; Fei Yimin, publisher of Ta Kung Pao, member of the NPC and member of the Legal Commission under the NPC Standing Committee; and David K. P. Li, chairman of the Bank of East Asia. The appointment of Pao, Ann, and Li as vice-chairmen showed the Chinese desire to form a political alliance with the capitalists as a strategy of "political absorption of economics". Ann and Pao also represented the Shanghai and Li the Cantonese factions, the two most important business groups in Hong Kong. All of the Hong Kong vice-xhairmen were politically conservative and unlikely to object to Chinese leadership ideas for Hong Kongs future political arrangements.

There were total of 12 tycoons among the 23 Hong Kong members in the drafting committee. Besides the pro-Beijing figures, there were also members from various sectors as part of the Chinese Communist Party's united front strategy and also to show the BLDC represented different interests in Hong Kong. The two Unofficial Members of the Executive and Legislative Council Office (UMELCO) members were Maria Tam and Wong Po-yan from the British colonial establishment, as well as the judge of the Appeal Court Simon Li. Lau Wong-fat, the chairman of Heung Yee Kuk and the vice-chancellors of the two universities were also selected. Rev. Peter Kwong, archbishop of Hong Kong, was appointed to represent religious sector, as well as senior professionals and a leftist trade unionist Tam Yiu-chung of the Hong Kong Federation of Trade Unions. Two liberal figures who had been calling for greater democracy Martin Lee, a barrister, and Szeto Wah, a teacher and head of the Hong Kong Professional Teachers' Union were also appointed to the BLDC. The inclusion of Lee and Szeto was in line with the united front practice of offering membership to a small number of vocal critics so they could be controlled through the rule of procedures.

15 of the 36 mainland members were officials concerned with various aspects of mainland relations with Hong Kong, 11 of them were legal experts. With the number of Mainland members exceeding the number of Hong Kong members by a safe margin, Beijing had overwhelming numerical superiority on the drafting committee.

The BLDC embers were divided in five sub-groups, each group focusing on one area of discussion. The groups were on the Relationship Between the Central Authorities and the HKSAR; Fundamental Rights and Duties of Residents; the Political Structure; the Economy; and Education Science, Technology, Culture, Sports and Religion. The BLDC's Secretariat was located in Beijing. The secretary general was Li Hou, the deputy director of the Hong Kong and Macao Affairs Office. The two deputy secretaries general were Lu Ping and Mao Junnian, a deputy director of the CCP Hong Kong. A research department was set up within Xinhua Hong Kong to gather comments, models and recommendations on political systems and political development put forward by the Hong Kong public. The heads of the research department were Mao Junnian and Qiao Zhonghuai, both deputy directors of the CCP Hong Kong.

== Issues ==
=== Basic Law Consultative Committee ===
The first meeting of the BLDC was held on 1 July 1985. A plan was tabled by Ji Pengfei of forming a Basic Law Consultative Committee (BLCC) to canvass public opinion on the Basic Law in Hong Kong. The BLCC was formed in December 1985 with many BLDC members holding the key positions of the Consultative Committee, including T. K. Ann who was the vice-chairman of the BLDC was selected the Chairman of the BLCC.

=== Political system ===
The political system of the HKSAR was the most hotly debated topic outside and inside the Drafting Committee. The principal issues were the methods of the election of the members of the Legislative Council of Hong Kong, the election of appointment of the Chief Executive of Hong Kong, and the relationship between the executive and legislature.

The business conservative lobby preferred the Chief Executive to be selected through an electoral college and an executive-led system in which the executive would dominate the political system, while the liberal professionals and grassroots organisations demanded direct elections for the Chief Executive. It was also supported by the members of the Legislative and Executive Councils.

The consultative process by the BLCC stimulated much public discussion and lobbying. During the first consultation period, the BLCC received 73,000 submissions, as well as many public meetings being held and discussions in the media. The response in the second period was smaller as it was taken over by the Tiananmen Square event.

Two groups were formed during the consultation period, the well-funded Group of 89 formed the conservative business people and the Joint Committee on the Promotion of Democratic Government (JCPDG) formed by the about 190 political, community and grassroots organisations and led by liberal activists Szeto Wah and Martin Lee. The two groups organised their support among the public, lobbied for their positions through the consultative process. The conservative business sector preferred a combination of the functional constituency and electoral college while the liberals wanted all or substantial number of members elected directly through universal suffrage. The Legislative and Executive Council members were also able to agree on the "OMELCO consensus" on the electoral system. Additionally, Lo Tak-shing also put forward proposals for a bicameral legislature. Lo's proposals resulted in a dual system of voting in the Legislative Council which strengthened both the executive and functional members.

In 1988, Louis Cha, an influential author and publisher of Ming Pao, and also the co-convenor of the BLDC panel on constitutional structure proposed his so-called mainstream model which was against the early introduction of direct elections for both Legislative Council and Chief Executive. Cha claimed that it had incorporated all the major common features of the various competing alternatives as advocated by the liberal democratic Group of 190, the conservative Group of 89, and pro-Beijing organs. However, the model had never been listed as one of the alternatives in the BLCC's five-volume consultation report and collection of public opinions on the first draft issued in October–November 1988. Even most of the BLDC Hong Kong members were surprised when Cha hurriedly produced his mainstream model just one day before the BLDC panel meeting. The Hong Kong public was enraged by this highly unusual twist and improper, preemptive procedural strike by Cha. Some regarded Cha's maneuver as a conspiracy and front of the anti-direct election coalition of Beijing, business conservatives and leftist organs.

In December 1988, the Drafting Committee adopted the mainstream model in the draft dealt a near fatal blow to the democratic aspirations of the liberal activists. The pro-democracy groups in Hong Kong held a month-long hunger strike protesting the passage of the mainstream model. The Hong Kong Journalists Association demanded Cha resign from the BLDC in order to avoid a conflict of interest. Local undergraduates publicly burned Cha's Ming Pao outside its editorial premises.

The competing models for political structure in the Basic Law are listed as follows:

Louis Cha's "mainstream" model	T. S. Lo's model	"4:4:2" compromise model	"OMELCO Consensus" model
Composition of the Legislative Council
Direct elected seats: 1997: 27%; 2003: 38%; 2007: 50%; 2012: to be decided by referendum	Direct elected seats: 1997: 25%; 2003: to be decided by SAR government	Direct elected seats: 1997: 40%; 2001: 60%; 2005: to be decided by SAR government	Direct elected seats: 1995: no less than 50%; 1997: no less than 50%; 1999: 67%; 2003: 100%
Functional constituency seats: 1997: 73%; 2003: 62%; 2007: 50%	Functional constituency seats: 1997: 50%; 2003: to be decided by SAR government	Functional constituency seats: 1997: 40%; 2001: 40%; 2005: to be decided by SAR government	Functional constituency seats: 1995: 50%; 1997: 50%; 1999: 33%; 2003: 0%
	Electoral college seats: 1997: 25%; 2003: to be decided by SAR government	Electoral college seats: 1997: 20%; 2001: 0%	
Selection of the Chief Executive
Universal suffrage in 2012 decided by referendum	Universal suffrage in 2003	Universal suffrage in 2005	Universal suffrage in 2003

The debate was intensified by the 1989 Tiananmen Square protests and massacre, which reinforced the liberals' view of the imperative of democracy, while it gave additional ground to conservatives to oppose it, as provocative to the new sovereign. Little attention was paid to the views conveyed through the BLCC when the BLDC met to finalise its proposals, but focused on small number of largely conservative suggestions.

=== Through train ===
At the early stage of the drafts, some Hong Kong members proposed that the last legislature to be elected should become the first legislature of the HKSAR so called "through train", in the interests of a smooth transition. It was allegedly strongly opposed by Ji Pengfei. However, in November 1988 when the matter was raised by the British in the context of the discussions with the PRC on convergence, the PRC authorities agreed that the Basic Law should not include provisions on the formation of the first legislature and left it to be resolved by the NPC after the two sovereigns had worked out the details. The discussions between the two governments were kept secret, even the BLDC members did not know until the decisions were made by the two governments. The through train was later abandoned by the PRC government after the last British governor Chris Patten's controversial electoral reform in 1994.

=== Application of the Chinese Constitution ===
At the very beginning of the process, some Hong Kong members requested a clarification of relationship between the Constitution of China and the Hong Kong Basic Law. Martin Lee proposed that the Basic Law should specify with articles of the Chinese Constitution applied to Hong Kong but was rejected by the Mainland members, who considered that the Basic Law should be subordinate to the Constitution but only the NPC could specify which provisions of the Constitution would apply to Hong Kong. Towards the end, it was decided that the NPC should make a formal declaration of the validity of the Basic Law at the same time as it adopted the Basic Law.

=== Residual powers ===
The question of residual powers was also raised at the beginning. Szeto Wah proposed an article to effect that Hong Kong would be given authority over all powers not specifically vested in the Central Authorities. The Chinese legal experts resisted it as they claimed that the vesting of residual powers in Hong Kong was inconsistent with its status as a local administrative region within the unitary state. An attempt to stipulate definitively the powers would be vested in Hong Kong was abandoned. No satisfactory basis for establishing the powers of the HKSAR was provided.

=== Interpretation of Basic Law ===
The provision for the interpretation of the Basic Law was also debated. Although the Sino-British Joint Declaration provides that the powers of the final adjudication would lie with the HKSAR courts, in the concept of the PRC authorities, adjudication did not include interpretation, which under the Chinese Constitution was a responsibility of the National People's Congress Standing Committee (NPCSC). Martin Lee argued that the power of interpretation should be vested in the Hong Kong courts, not the NPCSC as the original draft of the Basic Law had provided. A compromise was struck whereby the power to interpret those provisions which concerned the autonomy of the region was to the delegated to the HKSAR by the NPCSC. The Hong Kong courts were also excluded from their purview any executive acts of the central government by a provision in the original drafts. Lee regarded this as a major derogation from the principle of the rule of law.

=== Regional emblem and flag ===
At the ninth plenary meeting of the Drafting Committee in February 1990, the Committee voted on the Regional Flag and Regional Emblem (Amendment). A two-thirds majority (34 votes) voted in favour of No. 2 design of the Regional Flag and Regional Emblem. It also voted on the finalised Basic Law (Draft).

== Tiananmen protests ==
The drafting process was disrupted after the student protests in Beijing which culminated in the Tiananmen massacre in June 1989. Two members of the Drafting Committee, Louis Cha and Peter Kwong resigned after the PRC government imposed martial law on 20 May 1989. The PRC government expelled Martin Lee and Szeto Wah, the most vocal advocates of democratisation on the committee and founders of the Hong Kong Alliance in Support of Patriotic Democratic Movements of China, after the duo announced their resignations from the committee.

== Promulgation of Basic Law ==
The Third Session of the 7th National People's Congress held on 4 April 1990 adopted Basic Law, including Annex I: Method for the Selection of the Chief Executive, Annex II: Method for the Formation of the Legislative Council, and Annex III: National Laws to be Applied in Hong Kong, and the designs of the regional lag and regional emblem. On the same day, the Basic Law was promulgated by the President of the PRC Yang Shangkun. The Drafting Committee ceased to exist then.

== Membership ==
Chairman: Ji Pengfei
Vice-chairmen: T. K. Ann, Y. K. Pao, Xu Jiatun, Fei Yimin, Hu Sheng, Fei Xiaotong, Wang Hanbin, David Li
Secretary: Li Hou
Deputy Secretaries: Lu Ping, Mao Junnian
All members:

- Ma Lin
- Wang Hanbin
- Wang Shuwen
- Wang Teya
- Mao Junnian
- Sir Y. K. Pao
- Rev. Peter Kwong
- Szeto Wah
- Dr. Raymond Wu
- Lau Wong-fat
- T. K. Ann
- Xu Jiatun
- Xu Chongde
- Rui Mu
- Li Hou
- David Li
- Martin Lee
- Li Yumin
- Simon Li
- Li Ka-shing
- Xiao Weiyun
- Wu Dakun
- Wu Jianfan
- Zhang Youyu
- Chen Xin
- Chen Chu
- Shao Tianren
- Lin Hengyuan
- Zhou Nan
- Cheng Ching-fun
- Zheng Weirong
- Xiang Chunyi
- Rong Yiren
- Hu Sheng
- Ke Zaishuo
- Louis Cha
- Cha Chi-min
- Fei Xiaotong
- Fei Yimin
- Yong Longgui
- Mo Yinggui
- Jia Shi
- Qian Weichang
- Qian Changzhou
- Guo Dihuo
- Sanford Yung
- Ji Pengfei
- Rayson Huang
- Wong Po-yan
- Rev. Sik Kwok-kwong
- Lu Ping
- Qiu Shaoheng
- Lei Jieqiong
- Liao Hui
- Liu Yiu-chu
- Duanmu Zheng
- Maria Tam
- Tam Yiu-chung
- Fok Ying-tun

== Bibliography ==
- Browne, Nick; Pickowicz, Paul G.; Yau, Esther, eds. (1994). New Chinese Cinemas: Forms, Identities, Politics. New York: Cambridge University Press. ISBN 0521444098.
- Carroll, John Mark (2007). A Concise History of Hong Kong. Lanham: Rowman & Littlefield. ISBN 9780742534216.
- Chan, Ming K.; Clark, David J. (1991). The Hong Kong Basic Law : blueprint for "stability and prosperity" under Chinese sovereignty?. Hong Kong: Hong Kong University Press. ISBN 9622092969.
- Ghai, Yash (1999). Hong Kong's New Constitutional Order: The Resumption of Chinese Sovereignty and the Basic Law. Hong Kong: Hong Kong University Press. ISBN 9622094635.
- Loh, Christine (2010). Underground front. Hong Kong University Press. ISBN 9789622099968.
- The Hong Kong Special Administrative Region (2012). Drafting and Promulgation of the Basic Law and Hong Kong's Reunification with the Motherland (PDF).
