= Hong Kong Basic Law Consultative Committee =

1985 committee of National People's Congress, China

- Traditional Chinese: 香港基本法諮詢委員會
- Simplified Chinese: 香港基本法谘询委员会
Transcriptions
Standard Mandarin
- Hanyu Pinyin: Xiānggǎng Jīběnfǎ Zīxún Wěiyuánhuì
Yue: Cantonese
- Jyutping: hoeng1 gong2 gei1 bun2 faat3 zi1 seon1 wai2 jyun4 wui6*2

The Hong Kong Special Administrative Region Basic Law Consultative Committee (BLCC; 香港基本法諮詢委員會) was an official body established in 1985 to canvass views in Hong Kong on the drafts of the Hong Kong Basic Law.

== Background ==
The formation of the Consultative Committee was decided at the first meeting of the Hong Kong Basic Law Drafting Committee (BLDC), for consultation with the Hong Kong people on various drafts of the Hong Kong Basic Law. The membership of the BLCC was completely consisted of Hong Kong persons. 25 of the Hong Kong members of the Drafting Committee formed a Sponsors Committee to work on the formation of the BLCC. The five BLDC vice-chairmen residing in Hong Kong including Xu Jiatun were asked to take up the preparatory work for setting up the BLCC while the Xinhua News Agency provided the necessary assistance. Three of the tycoons on the BLDC provided necessary funds to cover costs.

The appointment of Consultative Committee was opposed by some influential members from the business sector in the Drafting Committee, as it introduced an unnecessary degree of democracy and public participation. In the end the BLDC members had considerable influence over the composition and work of the Consultative Committee since they drafted the constitution of the BLCC. After almost six months of preparations, the Consultative Committee was formally established on 18 December 1985. T. K. Ann, chief opponent of the Consultative Committee and vice-chairman of the BLDC was appointed the chair of the BLCC and other members were given key positions through procedures of dubious validity. Mao Junnian, the Secretary General of the BLCC, was subsequently replaced by Leung Chun-ying.

== Composition ==
The Consultative Committee had 180 members. Some of members were nominated by designated organisations, but most of them were invited directly by the Drafting Committee members, who also vetoed over nominations of the organisations. The BLCC members also included the Senior Unofficial Members of the Legislative Council of Hong Kong, Lydia Dunn and of the Executive Council, Chung Sze-yuen, who were appointed by the British colonial government. It also included a number of social activists who called for a faster pace of democratic reform, such as Lee Wing-tat and Frederick Fung. The Consultative Committee was criticised of favouring over the conservative business and professional interests, and nominating some key pro-Beijing figures. Lau Chin-shek of the Hong Kong Christian Industrial Committee was initially nominated by a labour joint conference to stand for selection by was turned down by Xu Jiatun on the ground that "quite a few businessmen in Hong Kong resented him."

The Consultative Committee formed eight sub-groups, namely the structure of the Basic Law; the political structure; law; residents' rights and duties; finance, business, and economy; culture, science and technology, education and religion; external affairs; and the relationship between Central Authorities and the Special Administrative Region. Although it was planned to seek the views of Hong Kong residents, groups, ministries and individuals in China, but no formal machinery was established for this purpose.

The effectiveness of the BLCC was doubted as the public opinion was pushed through the BLCC which the Consultative Committee would merely report the diversity of the views to the Drafting Committee, but not indicate the degree of public support of the public views.

== Election ==
At the first meeting of the Consultative Committee during the election of the executive committee of the BLCC, a BLDC member, Y. K. Pao showed up to chair the meeting although he was not a BLCC member. He ignored procedures and proceeded to read out a list of 19 names saying who would be the chairman and who would be secretary and so on, and then he directed the gathered members to elect them with a round of applause. This kind of arrangement was commonplace on the Mainland but not in Hong Kong and it led to complaints. Although another meeting was called to rectify the violation of procedures, the same nineteen members were chosen and seven officers were also "elected".

== Factions ==
The dominating group within the Consultative Committee was the Business and Professional Group of the Basic Law Consultative Committee, as known as the Group of 89, led by tycoon Vincent Lo. It was formed in April 1985 by 57 BLCC members and later added two more members.

Subsequently, the liberal community representatives, social workers and professionals BLCC members formed the Group of 190. However it was a small group compared to the Group of 89 without resources that the business elites commanded.

To avoid future divisions, the Chinese government created the positions of Hong Kong Affairs Adviser and District Affairs Adviser in 1992. The highly honorific titles helped to prevent disputes in Beijing's 'united front'.

== Consultation process ==
The BLCC held two rounds of consultation on drafting the Basic Law. The first was from May to September in 1986, the second from February to October in 1989. During the first consultation period, the BLCC received 73,000 submissions for the electoral issues of the legislature after 1997. There were also many public meetings being held and discussions in the media. The response in the second period was smaller as it was taken over by the Tiananmen Square event.

After the Tiananmen massacre on 4 June 1989, the Consultative Committee suspended its work for a few weeks. The BLCC ceased to exist of the Basic Law was adopted by the National People's Congress on 4 April 1990 and promulgated the same day by the President of China, Yang Shangkun.

== Membership ==
List of members of the Basic Law Consultative Committee: (the list is in Chinese character order consistent with the official document)

- Van Lau
- Man Sai-cheong
- Man Hon-ming
- Mo Kwan-nin
- Wilfred Wong Ying-wai
- Ronnie Wong Man-chiu
- Wong Kwan-cheng
- Shek Wai
- Seto Fai
- James Tien Pei-chun
- Annie Wu Suk-ching
- Ann Tse-kai
- Lawrence C.H. Chu
- Aloysius Chu Fee-loong
- Kong Tak-yan
- Ho Man-fat
- Ho Ting-kwan
- Edward Ho Sing-tin
- Raymond Ho Chung-tai
- Stanley Ho
- Ewan Yee Lup-yuen
- Lee Jung-kong
- Harold T. Wu
- Steve Ng Siu-pang
- Peter Woo Kwong-ching
- Ng Tor-tai
- Ng Hong-mun
- Agnes Ng Mung-chan
- Ng Kam-tsuen
- Ng Yiu-tung
- Shum Choi-sang
- Nick Griffin
- Lee Wing-tat
- Peter Lee Chung-yin
- Paul Lee Kai-yu
- Lee Kai-ming
- Lee Lin-sang
- Arthur Li Kwok-cheung
- Richard Li King-hang
- Li Siu-kei
- Ronald Li Fook-shiu
- Elsie Tu
- A. de O. Sales
- Shung Jih-chong
- Shen Peng-ying
- Michael Naele Somerville
- Philip Yuen Pak-yiu
- Nelson Chow Wing-sun
- Lam Kwong-yu
- John Stove Lambourn
- Shao You-bao
- Eddy Yau Shik-fan
- Christina Yu Wai-mui
- Veronica W. Cha
- Louis Cha
- Hu Fa-kuang
- Hu Chu-jen
- Tang Hsiang-chien
- Wut Chiu
- Tsui Sze-man
- Zee Sze-yong
- Zee Kwoh-kung
- William H.C. Tsui
- Samson Sun
- Sun Sheng-tsang
- Anthony Ha Man-ho
- Louis E. Keloon Ha
- Hari N. Harilela
- Joseph Ma Ching-chung
- Ko Siu-wah
- Ko Gar-yee
- William Ko Chan-gock
- Cheung Sai-lam
- Tommy Cheung Yu-yan
- Cheung Yau-kai
- Cheung Pak-chi
- Chang Ka-mun
- Cheung Chun-kwok
- Denis Chang Khen-lee
- Chang Wan-fung
- Stephen Cheong Kam-chuen
- Andrew Chuang Siu-leung
- Kwok Yuen-hon
- Kwok Man-cho
- Philip Kwok Chi-kuen
- Tso Wung-wai
- Leung Siu-tong
- Leung Lam-hoi
- Leung Chun-ying
- Leong Che-hung
- Cheung Lun
- Kasim Wilson Tuet Wai-sin
- Anthony Luk Tung-chin
- John Lok Hsiao-pei
- Chan Pun
- Peter Chan Chi-kwan
- Chan Siu-kam
- Chan Wing-kee
- Chan Hip-ping
- Edward Chen
- Chan Ying-lun
- Thomas Chen Tseng-tao
- Chan Cheng-chun
- Edwin Tao Hsueh-chi
- Mak Chan
- Mak Hoi-wah
- I.R.A. MacCallum
- Michael Miles
- To Shui-moon
- Tsang Kwong-to
- Tsang Hin-chi
- Jeffrey Y.S. Tsang
- Wan Kwok-shing
- Cheng Kai-nam
- Ching Yune-kai
- Shu Tse-wong
- David Edward Leslie Wong Yat-huen
- Wong Wan-tin
- Wong Kong-hon
- Wong Hong-yuen
- Philip Wong Yu-hong
- Wong Po-yan
- Raymond Huang
- Wong Lai-chuen
- Rayson Lisung Huang
- Fung Ho-keung
- Tony Fung Wing-cheung
- William Fung Kwok-lun
- Fung Wai-kwong
- Daniel R. Fung
- Frederick Fung Kin-kee
- Yeung Yue-man
- Howard Young
- T.L. Yang
- Henrietta Ip Man-hing
- Ip Yeuk-lam
- Luke Yip Jing-ping
- Tung Chee-hwa
- Raymond Wu Wai-yung
- Kenneth Chow Charn-ki
- Peter J. Wrangham
- Lawrence Kadoorie
- Liu Ching-leung
- Liu Lit-man
- Lincoln Yung Chu-kuen
- William Mong Man-wai
- Liu Yong-ling
- Lau Nai-keung
- Eric Au Sing-wai
- Poon Chung-kwong
- Poon Chun-leung
- Pun Kwok-shing
- Pun Chiu-yin
- Choy Tak-ho
- Tam Ling-kwan
- Mignonne Cheng
- Cheng Yu-tung
- Cheng Chung-wai
- Cheng Yiu-tong
- Tang Hing-yee
- Lo King-man
- Tsin Sai-nin
- Fok Wah-pun
- Timothy Fok Tsun-ting
- Daniel Tse Chi-wai
- Char Nee-quin
- Jacob Tse Wai-chee
- Chung King-fai
- Chung Chi-yung
- Brian H. Tisdall
- Patrick Charles Samuel Deveson
- David Wylie Gairns
- Kan Fook-yee
- Peter Kwong Kong-kit
- Vincent Lo Hong-sui
- Anthony Gordon Rogers
- Lo Tak-shing
- Helmut Sohmen
- Ku Sze-chung
- Kung Chi-keung

== See also ==
- Hong Kong Basic Law Drafting Committee

== Bibliography ==
- Bereuter, Doug (1997). Hong Kong's Reversion to the People's Republic of China: Hearing Before the Committee on International Relations, U.S. House of Representatives. Washington: U.S. G.P.O. ISBN 0160556651.
- The Hong Kong Special Administrative Region (2012). Drafting and Promulgation of the Basic Law and Hong Kong's Reuniication with the Motherland (PDF).
- Loh, Christine (2010). Underground front. Hong Kong University Press. ISBN 9789622099968.
- Ghai, Yash (1999). Hong Kong's New Constitutional Order: The Resumption of Chinese Sovereignty and the Basic Law. Hong Kong: Hong Kong University Press. ISBN 9622094635.
