= Tsang Hin-chi =

Hong Kong entrepreneur and politician (1934–2019)

Tsang Hin-chi, GBM (simplified Chinese: 曾宪梓; traditional Chinese: 曾憲梓; pinyin: Zēng Xiànzǐ; 2 February 1934 – 20 September 2019) was a Hong Kong entrepreneur and politician. He was the founder and president of the Goldlion Group Co. Ltd. and a member of the Standing Committee of the National People's Congress (NPCSC).

== Biography ==
Tsang was born in Meixian County, Guangdong into a poor peasant family in 1934. His father died when Tsang was four years old and he was raised by his mother. Tsang was graduate from Sun Yat-sen University in biology with government grants in 1961. In 1963, Tsang went to Thailand via Hong Kong and was united with other family members. His family moved to Hong Kong in 1968.

Together with his wife Huang Liqun, Tsang founded his manufacturing company which later became Goldlion Group Co. Ltd. when he cleared half of his house for a workplace. He produced ties by his own by copying from some internationally famous brands and mixing in his own designs. He also imported some expensive materials from France and refined his techniques, which later turned into the success of his company.

In the 1980s, Tsang became involved in philanthropic activities. In 1992, he established the Tsang Hin Chi Education Fund for poor students. He later served as chairman and later honorary president of Jinan University. He was also a core member of the pro-Beijing Chinese General Chamber of Commerce in which he became the life honorary chairman. He also became member of the executive committee of the All-China Federation of Industry and Commerce in 1993 and vice-chairman of the Guangdong and National Federations of Industry and Commerce.

In 1985, he was appointed member of the Hong Kong Basic Law Consultative Committee for drafting the Basic Law of Hong Kong. In 1992, he was invited to become 1st Group of Hong Kong Affairs Advisors of the Hong Kong and Macao Affairs Office of the State Council of the People's Republic of China. In 1993, he became member of the Standing Committee of the National People's Congress (NPCSC), where he served two terms from 1993 to 2003. He was also appointed to the HKSAR Preparatory Committee on the eve of the handover of Hong Kong. He was a member of the Selection Committee, which was responsible for electing the first Chief Executive and Provisional Legislative Council

He was a vocal supporter of the Beijing government and strong critic of the pro-democracy camp. In 2004, he accused Martin Lee, Szeto Wah and Cheung Man-kwong are "definitely unpatriotic" for their bag of sins (being key members of the Hong Kong Alliance in Support of Patriotic Democratic Movements in China formed during the Tiananmen protests of 1989), including objecting to the Hong Kong Basic Law Article 23 national security legislation and organising the 1 July 2003 rally.

According to Radio Free Asia, Tsang Hin-chi received a kidney transplant operation in the No. 1 Affiliated Hospital to Guangzhou Zhongshan University in 2000. The kidney he received was allegedly extracted from an executed prisoner but was not reported due to political sensitivity.

Tsang died in Meizhou on 20 September 2019, aged 85.

== Honours ==
In 1993, an asteroid numbered 3388, which was discovered by the Purple Mountain Observatory of the Chinese Academy of Sciences, was named after him. He was also among the first recipients of the Grand Bauhinia Medal in 1997, the highest honor of the Hong Kong Special Administrative Region. Tsang was named an honorary citizen by several major Chinese cities, including Beijing, Harbin, Shenyang, Dalian, and Guangzhou. He also held an honorary doctorate from Zhongshan University and Hong Kong Polytechnic University.

The Meixian Tsang Hin-chi Stadium in Meixian District was named after Tsang Hin-chi, who donated ¥15 million for construction of the stadium.

National People's Congress
Preceded by Henry Fok; Zhou Nan	Member of Standing Committee; Representative for Hong Kong SAR; 1994–2008	Succeeded by Rita Fan
