= Zhang Xiaoming =

Chinese politician (born 1963)

- 张晓明
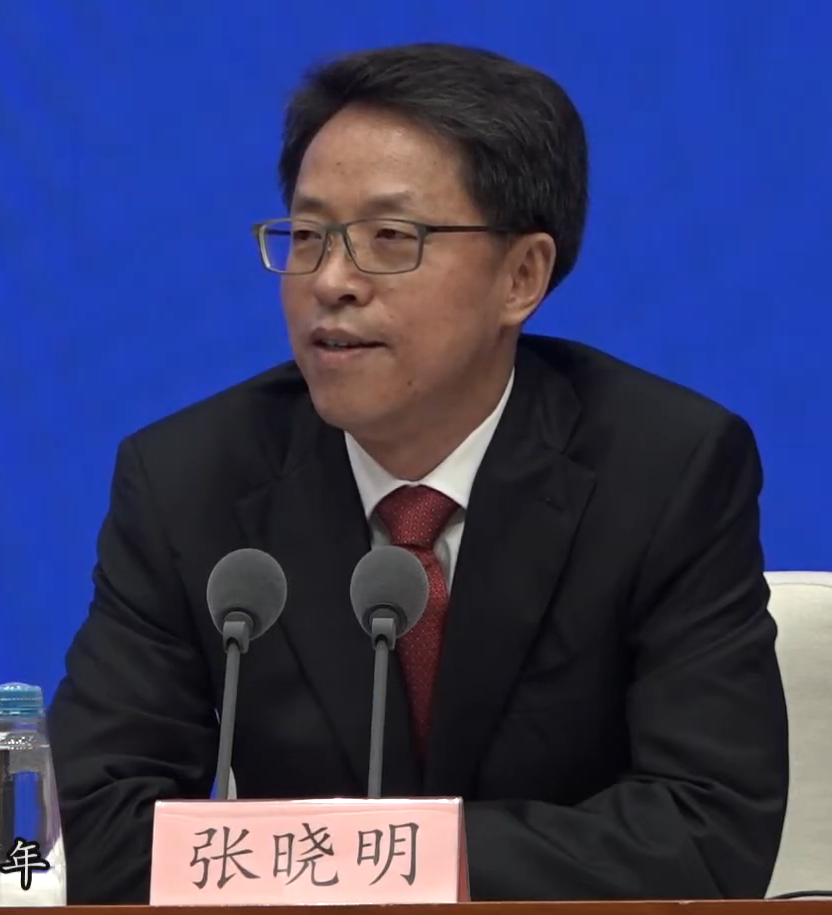
- Zhang Xiaoming in July 2020

Deputy Director of the Hong Kong and Macau Affairs Office
- In office 13 February 2020 – 28 June 2022
- Director: Xia Baolong

Director of the Hong Kong and Macau Affairs Office
- In office 23 September 2017 – 13 February 2020
- Premier: Li Keqiang
- Leader: Zhang Dejiang → Han Zheng
- Preceded by: Wang Guangya
- Succeeded by: Xia Baolong

Director of the Liaison Office of the Central People's Government in Hong Kong
- In office 18 December 2012 – 22 September 2017
- Premier: Wen Jiabao; Li Keqiang
- Leader: Zhang Dejiang
- Preceded by: Peng Qinghua
- Succeeded by: Wang Zhimin

Personal details
- Born: 3 September 1963 (age 63) Taizhou, Jiangsu, China
- Party: Chinese Communist Party
- Education: Southwest University of Political Science & Law; Renmin University of China

Chinese name
- Traditional Chinese: 張曉明
- Simplified Chinese: 张晓明
Transcriptions
Standard Mandarin
- Hanyu Pinyin: Zhāng Xiǎomíng

Zhang Xiaoming (Chinese: 张晓明; born 3 September 1963) is a Chinese politician. He was the director of the Liaison Office of the Central People's Government in Hong Kong and then of the Hong Kong and Macau Affairs Office, before being demoted to deputy director of the latter due to the 2019–2020 Hong Kong protests.

== Early life ==
Zhang was born in Taizhou, Jiangsu in September 1963. He graduated from Southwest University of Political Science & Law and Renmin University of China in 1984, where he majored in law. He studied under Gao Mingxuan (高铭暄), who is a famous jurist in China. Zhang received an LLM from Renmin University of China in 1986.

== Party politician ==
In 1986, Zhang was assigned to Hong Kong and Macau Affairs Office as a secretary for Liao Hui. On 18 December 2012, Zhang started serving as director of the Liaison Office of the Central People's Government in the Hong Kong Special Administrative Region and spearheaded the CCP's efforts against the democratic movement in the former British colony. In a widely reported incident he stated to pro-democratic legislative council member Leung Yiu-chung that "the fact that you are allowed to stay alive already shows the country's inclusiveness".

In September 2015, Zhang stirred controversy in Hong Kong after claiming that the Chief Executive of Hong Kong had a "special legal position which overrides administrative, legislative and judicial organs" and that separation of powers is "not suitable for Hong Kong". Chief Executive Leung Chun-ying subsequently affirmed that his position is "transcendent" of the branches of the state.

He continued as director of the Liaison Office till 2017, when he was promoted to director of the Hong Kong and Macau Affairs Office. He was demoted, in February 2020, during the widespread anti-government protests and the COVID-19 pandemic affecting Hong Kong, to a deputy directorship of that office. Zhang is an alternate of the 18th Central Committee of the Chinese Communist Party.

In November 2020, following the expulsion of four pro-democracy lawmakers from the Legislative Council, Zhang said "Hong Kong's administrators must be patriots... and people who are anti-China and cause trouble in Hong Kong must be kicked out. This is a political rule under 'one country, two systems', and has become a legal requirement now."

Also in November 2020, Zhang called for judicial reforms in Hong Kong. In January 2021, Chief Justice Geoffrey Ma responded and said that the judiciary should not be reformed simply due to the pro-Beijing party being unhappy with the court's rulings.

In March 2021, while on a trip to Hong Kong to survey opinions about planned changes to the electoral system to implement "patriots" ruling the government, Zhang claimed that he met with pan-democrats, without specifically naming any.

On 2 March 2024, two days before the annual Two Sessions, it became public that Zhang would be leaving the Hong Kong and Macau Affairs Office; delegates attending the session called this a "normal leadership reshuffle".

=== US sanctions ===
In August 2020, Zhang and ten other officials were sanctioned by the United States Department of the Treasury under Executive Order 13936 by United States President Donald Trump for undermining Hong Kong's autonomy.

On 14 October 2020, the United States Department of State released a report on 10 individuals who materially contributed to the failure of China to meet its obligations under the Sino–British Joint Declaration and Hong Kong's Basic Law. Zhang was on the list.

Government offices
Preceded by Peng Qinghua	Director of Liaison Office of the Central People's Government in Hong Kong; 2012－2017	Succeeded by Wang Zhimin
Preceded by Wang Guangya	Director of Hong Kong and Macau Affairs Office; 2017－2020	Succeeded by Xia Baolong
