= Chan Wing-kee =

Hong Kong businessman and politician

Chan Wing-kee, GBM, GBS, OBE, JP (Chinese: 陳永棋; born January 1947) is a Hong Kong businessman and politician. He is the current member of the standing committee of the Chinese People's Political Consultative Conference (CPPCC). He had also been Hong Kong deputy of the National People's Congress and chairman of Asia Television Limited.

== Early life and education ==
Chan was born in Hong Kong in 1947 with his family root in Dongguan, Guangdong. His father, Chan Sui Wai, was a famous draper in Guangdong and Hong Kong and his uncle, Chan Sui Kau, was the founder of Yangtzekiang Garment Ltd. He studied at three primary schools, Shek Kong, Ling Ying and Henrietta. Chan was sent to Thailand when he was in Form Four where he attended an international school. He subsequently studied aboard in the United States and graduated from Purdue University in Industrial Engineering in 1970.

== Business career ==
Chan joined his family's company Yangtzekiang Garment Ltd after his graduation in 1970 as production manager and later became company's sales manager. He was promoted to director in 1977 and managing director in 1987. He has participated in many textile negotiations with the US and Europe for Hong Kong and Macau. Chan is currently an executive director of YGM Trading Limited; director of Hong Kong Knitters Ltd; independent non-executive director of China Travel International Investment Hong Kong Limited and China Construction Bank (Asia) Corporation Limited. He was also chairman of Asia Television Limited and an independent non-executive director of Wheelock and Company Limited.

== Political career ==
Chan had been appointed member of Hong Kong Trade Development Council, Textile Advisory Board and Economic Council of Macau. He has been an active member of the Chinese Manufacturers' Association of Hong Kong where he is now the honorary president. In the mid-1980s, Chan was appointed member of the Basic Law Consultative Committee both in Hong Kong and Macau, in which he belonged to the conservative faction of the committee and joined the proposal of the Group of 89. In 1989, he co-founded the conservative New Hong Kong Alliance. Chan was also a member of the executive committee of the Business and Professionals Federation of Hong Kong which derived from the Group of 89.

In 1993, Chan became Hong Kong deputy of the National People's Congress, the national legislature of the People's Republic of China (PRC), in which he served on 8th and 9th Congresses. He was also made Justice of the Peace and Officer of the Order of the British Empire (OBE) by the British authorities in the same year. Chan was appointed Hong Kong Affairs Adviser and member of the HKSAR Preparatory Committee on the eve of the handover of Hong Kong. He was also a member of the Selection Committee, which was responsible for electing the first Chief Executive and Provisional Legislative Council. In 2008, Chan has been member of the Election Committee which is responsible for electing the Chief Executive. Chan was appointed member of the National Committee of the Chinese People's Political Consultative Conference (CPPCC) where he was made a standing committee member. He has become the prominent mouthpiece of the Beijing government and vocal supporter of the Chief Executives and the SAR governments throughout the years. He was awarded Gold Bauhinia Star (GBS) in 2000 and Grand Bauhinia Medal (GBM), the highest honour of the HKSAR in 2016.

Chan is also leader of various Hong Kong community and business organisations, including vice chairman of China Overseas Friendship Association; chairman of Federation of Hong Kong Guangdong Community Organisations; honorary chairman and president of Hong Kong Federation of Overseas Chinese Associations; Council; honorary chairman of Friends of Hong Kong Association; honorary chairman of Textile Council of Hong Kong; honorary president of Federation of Hong Kong Garment Manufacturers; honorary chairman of Hong Kong Shippers’ Council; honorary chairman of The Hong Kong Exporters' Association; chairman of Cheng Si-Yuan (China-International) Hepatitis Research Foundation.

In February 2021, Chan called for the potential elimination of the popular-vote district councillors from participating in the election committee, stating that "The number of district councillors on the committee should be reduced. Another option is to remove the participation of district councillors altogether."

Business positions
Preceded by Wong Po-yan	Chairman of the Asia Television; 2002–2007	Succeeded by Payson Cha
