= Chongde =

Chongde (Chinese: 崇德; pinyin: chóngdé), meaning "Revering Virtue", may refer to:

- Chongde, Mingshui County, Suihua, Heilongjiang Province, China
- Chongde railway station, a railway station on the Taiwan Railways Administration
- Chongde Township, Xiaojin County, Sichuan Province, China
- Chongde Qaghan (died 824), the ninth ruler of Uyghurs
- Princess Chongde (崇德帝姬; died 1121), seventh daughter of the Emperor Huizong of Song
- Princess Chongde (崇德公主; died 1489), fourth daughter of the Emperor Yingzong of Ming
- Xu Chongde (1929–2014), a legal expert and professor and political scientist

== See also ==
- Wenxin Chongde metro station, a metro station of the Taichung Metro
