= Liao Hui =

Liao Hui may refer to:

- Liao Hui (politician)
- Liao Hui (weightlifter)
