= Leung Chun-ying =

Chief Executive of Hong Kong from 2012 to 2017

The Honourable Leung Chun-ying GBM GBS JP
- 梁振英
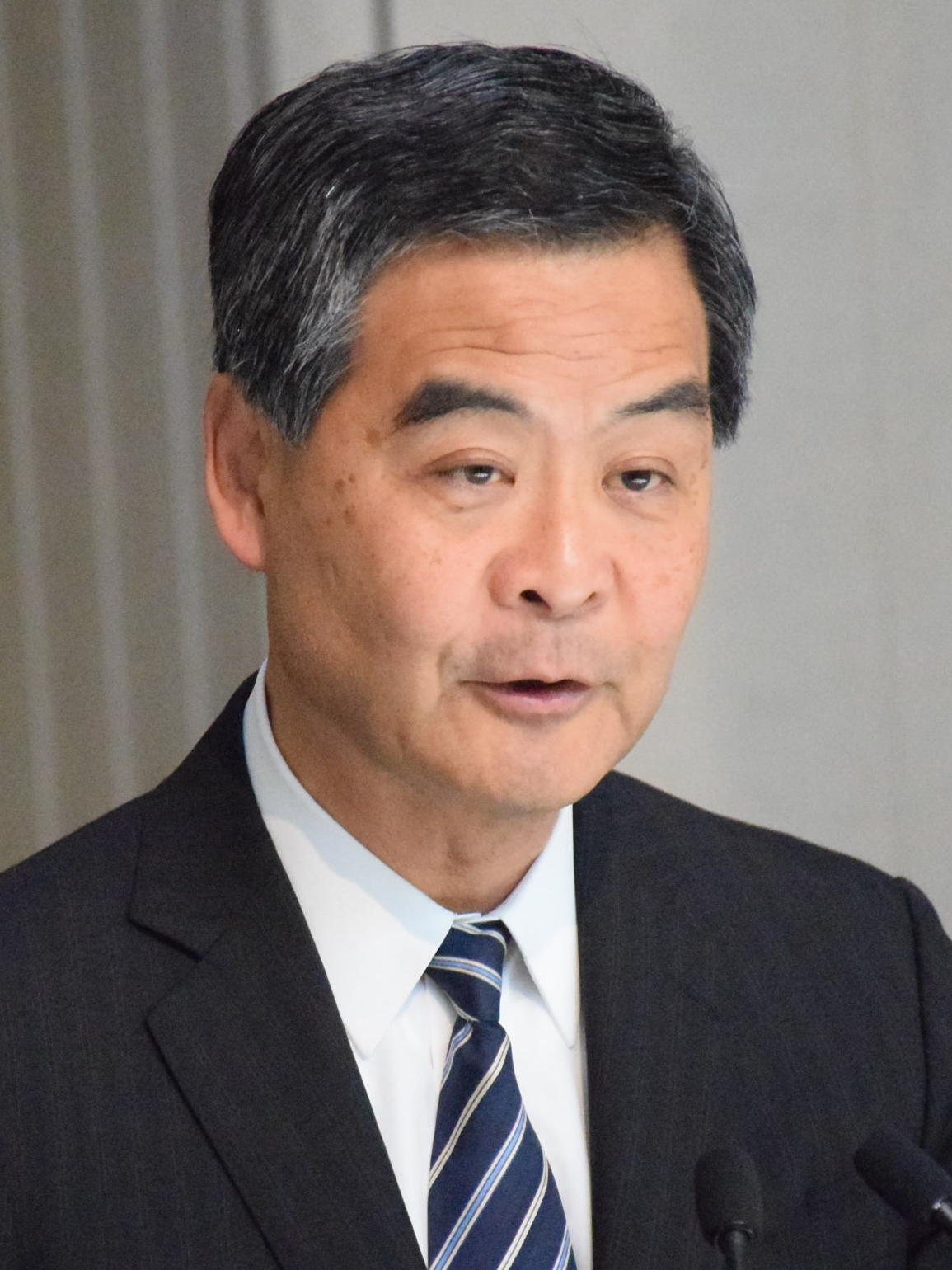
- Leung in 2017

3rd Chief Executive of Hong Kong
- In office 1 July 2012 – 30 June 2017
- President: Hu Jintao; Xi Jinping
- Premier: Wen Jiabao; Li Keqiang
- Preceded by: Donald Tsang
- Succeeded by: Carrie Lam

Vice Chairman of the Chinese People's Political Consultative Conference
- Incumbent
- Assumed office 13 March 2017
- Chairman: Yu Zhengsheng; Wang Yang; Wang Huning

Convenor of the Non-Official Members of the Executive Council
- In office 1 July 1999 – 3 October 2011
- Appointed by: Tung Chee-hwa; Donald Tsang
- Preceded by: Chung Sze-yuen
- Succeeded by: Ronald Arculli

Member of the Chinese People's Political Consultative Conference
- Incumbent
- Assumed office 28 February 2017
- In office 16 March 2003 – 21 June 2012

Member of the Legislative Council
- In office 21 December 1996 – 30 June 1998

Personal details
- Born: 12 August 1954 (age 72) Queen Mary Hospital, Pok Fu Lam, Hong Kong
- Party: Progressive Hong Kong Society (1980s); New Hong Kong Alliance (1990s)
- Spouse: Regina Leung Tong Ching-yee (m. 1981)
- Children: 3
- Education: King's College
- Alma mater: Hong Kong Polytechnic (HD); Bristol Polytechnic (BS)
- Origin: Weihaiwei, Shandong
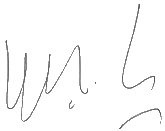
- Signature
- Nickname: CY Leung

Chinese name
- Chinese: 梁振英
Transcriptions
Standard Mandarin
- Hanyu Pinyin: Liáng Zhènyīng
- IPA: [ljǎŋ ʈʂə̂níŋ]
Wu
- Wugniu: lian^{2} tsen^{5} in^{1}
- IPA: Shanghainese: [liã˨ tsən˧ in˥˧]
Hakka
- Romanization: Liong^{2} Zin^{3} Yin^{1}
Yue: Cantonese
- Yale Romanization: Lèuhng Janyīng
- Jyutping: loeng^{4} zan^{3} jing^{1}
- IPA: [lœŋ˩ tsɐn˧ jɪŋ˥]

Leung Chun-ying GBM GBS JP KCM (Chinese: 梁振英; born 12 August 1954), also known as CY Leung, is a Hong Kong politician and chartered surveyor who has served as vice-chairman of the National Committee of the Chinese People's Political Consultative Conference since March 2017. He was previously the third Chief Executive of Hong Kong between 2012 and 2017.

A surveyor by profession, Leung entered politics when he joined the Hong Kong Basic Law Consultative Committee (HKBLCC) in 1985 and became its secretary-general in 1988. In 1999, he was appointed the convenor of the Executive Council of Hong Kong, a position he held until 2011, when he resigned to run in the 2012 Chief Executive election. Initially regarded as the underdog, Leung ran a successful campaign against front-runner Henry Tang, receiving 689 votes from the Election Committee and with the support of the Liaison Office.

At the beginning of his administration, Leung faced the anti-Moral and National Education protests and the Hong Kong Television Network protests. In 2014, Leung's government faced widespread civil disobedience targeting the government's constitutional reform proposals; the movement gained global attention as the "Umbrella Revolution". After the 2014 protests, Leung's government had to deal with the 2016 Mong Kok civil unrest. During his election campaign and governance, Leung also faced allegations related to his receipt of HK$50 million payment by UGL, which prompted initial investigations by the Australian Parliament. Leung's tenure coincided with the rise of social instability, localism in Hong Kong, and an independence movement for Hong Kong's separation from Chinese sovereignty. In December 2016, Leung announced he would not seek a second term, becoming the first Chief Executive not to do so.

== Early life and education ==
Leung was born at Queen Mary Hospital, the teaching hospital of University of Hong Kong, in Pok Fu Lam, Hong Kong on 12 August 1954 to Leung Zung-Jan and Kong Sau-Zi of Shandong origin. His father was a Hong Kong police officer who had stationed at the Government House.

Leung earned a scholarship to study at King's College, where he was a classmate of future democratic activist Lau San-ching. After graduation, he attended Hong Kong Polytechnic. In 1974, Leung undertook further studies in valuation and estate management at the Bristol Polytechnic (now known as the University of the West of England) and graduated in 1977 first in his class.

== Business career ==
Leung returned to Hong Kong after becoming a chartered surveyor and joined the real estate company Jones Lang Wootton, where he worked for five years. By the age of 30, he was made vice-chairman of the JLW branch in Hong Kong, and was reported to be making a yearly salary of HK$10 million.

Leung became the real estate advisor for Zhu Rongji when Zhu was mayor and party chief in Shanghai from 1987 to 1991. Zhu later became the Vice-Premier and then the 5th Premier of the People's Republic of China from March 1998 to March 2003. Later, in 2013, Leung appointed Levin Zhu Yunlai, the elder son of former premier Zhu Rongji, as an advisor in the Hong Kong Government's Financial Services Development Council.

From 1995 to 1996, Leung was the president of the Hong Kong Institute of Surveyors. He is a former chairman of the Hong Kong branch of Royal Institution of Chartered Surveyors. After holding the post, Leung became an honorary advisor for the local governments of Shenzhen, Tianjian and Shanghai on land reform. He has also taken up the post of international economic advisor for Hebei.

From 2002 to 2007, Leung was a board member in the Government of Singapore-owned banking firm DBS Group Holdings Ltd and DBS Bank Hong Kong Ltd.

=== DTZ Holdings ===
In 1993, Leung set up his own surveying company C. Y. Leung & Co., in Hong Kong, which then quickly set up many offices in Shanghai and Shenzhen. In 1995, C. Y. Leung & Co joined an international alliance comprising CB Commercial, Debenham Tewson & Chinnocks and DTZ. By 2000, his company merged with Singapore's Dai Yuk-coeng Company (戴玉祥產業諮詢公司) into DTZ Debenham Tie Leung Limited.

In December 2006, after a complex share swap, Leung emerged as owner of 4.61% of the 200-year-old London listed property consultancy DTZ Holdings. The deal involved HK$330 million cash and a share deal with Leung. In 2007, DTZ Holdings, replete with a US$400 million fund, expanded into the property market in mainland China. This fund was to be passed through Leung's regional company DTZ Asia Pacific.

In October 2011, one month before Leung announced his candidacy for the Hong Kong Chief Executive post, his company DTZ was hit by a liquidity crisis. Following this, after informing the London Stock Exchange that its shares were worthless, the board of DTZ, including Leung, agreed to sell DTZ to UGL. On 24 November 2011, Leung resigned as director from the board of DTZ and on 28 November 2011 announced his candidacy for the Hong Kong Chief Executive election.

=== UGL controversy ===
In October 2014, investigative reporters from the Australian newspaper The Age revealed details of an agreement Leung had signed on 2 December 2011, which entitled him to payment of £4 million from UGL in exchange for his supporting the acquisition of DTZ group assets by UGL, for not competing with UGL/DTZ and making himself available to provide advisory services for a period of two years from that date. The Age newspaper report stated that "the payments were made in two instalments, in 2012 and 2013, after he became Hong Kong's top official" but were not declared on Leung's register of interests. The payments relate to a deal in which UGL bought DTZ Holdings (the insolvent property services firm he was associated with), whose prospects depended on his network of managers and clients in Hong Kong and mainland China. Australian media also revealed that on the same day Leung signed the agreement, China's state-owned Tianjin Innovation Financial Investment Company had made a bid that valued DTZ at GBP100 million more than the bid by UGL, but that this more valuable bid was rejected by the DTZ board, which included Leung, and not released to shareholders. In December 2012, nine months after winning the Hong Kong Chief Executive election, Leung received the first tranche from UGL.

Following the Fairfax Media revelations of this agreement and the rejected competitive bid, many more questioned Leung's integrity in the "secret transaction" signed a few days before his election, expressing concerns of potential conflicts of interest and fraudulent preference. Prosecutors from Hong Kong's Independent Commission Against Corruption started investigations into this scandal, as did authorities in Australia. The abrupt and unprecedented sacking of Rebecca Li Bo-lan, a 30-year veteran graft-buster and the first female head of the ICAC investigative unit appointed in June 2015, fuelled suspicions of Leung's attempts to impede investigation.

== Early political career ==
In 1985, Leung joined the Hong Kong Basic Law Consultative Committee (HKBLCC), a 180-member body nominated by the Hong Kong Basic Law Drafting Committee (HKBLDC), that was to consult with Hong Kong people regarding various drafts of the Hong Kong Basic Law. The working of the BLCC was criticised as it had not established any formal machinery for the consultation process and did not indicate the degree of public support of views expressed. In 1988, Leung, then aged 34, was made the Secretary-General of the committee, replacing Mao Junnian. Former CCP member Leung Mo-han, and Leung's critics, have suggested that Leung must be a secret member of the Communist party, since, per the rules of the Chinese Communist Party, such senior positions are normally assumed only by party members. In 1990, the BLCC ceased to exist after the Basic Law was adopted by the National People's Congress. He was a founding member of the New Hong Kong Alliance (NHKA) set up by Lo Tak-shing in 1989 who led to a faction of the Group of 89, a conservative business and professional lobby group in the HKBLCC and HKBLDC. In 1989, the NHKA put forward an ultra-conservative proposal for the electoral methods for the Chief Executive and Legislative Council of the SAR.

Then-Chief Executive Tung Chee-hwa appointed Leung as the convenor of the Executive Council in 1998, replacing his predecessor Chung Sze-yuen. During Tung's 1997 policy address, he proposed that the government would build no less than 85,000 flats every year, allowing 70% of the citizens to own a house within 10 years. However, the proposal was put on hold in the wake of the 1997 Asian financial crisis. As convenor of the Executive Council, CY Leung has been questioned many times regarding this policy plan over the years. The 1997 pledge was not met. In 1999, Leung was awarded the Gold Bauhinia Star by the Hong Kong Government. In the 2002 Chief Executive election, Leung became the chairman of Tung Chee-hwa's campaign office. Tung was re-elected uncontestedly as a result.

He was also a member of the National Standing Committee of the Chinese People's Political Consultative Conference and only submitted his resignation one week prior to assuming his office of the Chief Executive of Hong Kong in 2012. He is currently the chairman and sits on the board of directors of the pro-Beijing One Country Two Systems Research Institute.

In 1999, Leung took over the position of council chairman of Lingnan University. In the same year, on 16 June 1999 the Lingnan College received University status. Leung continued in this position for nine years, until 21 October 2008.

In April 2008, Leung was appointed as chairman and member of the council of the City University of Hong Kong. Leung held this position until 2011. In terms of his performance as chairman, the university staff had scored Leung less than one point on a scale of 10. During his tenure as chairman, Leung was accused of attempts to weaken the power of the staff association.

In 2011, there were confrontations between police and demonstrators after the annual 1 July march amid public opposition to the government's draft legislation to eliminate by-elections for vacated Legco seats. Leung responded by saying that such rowdy rallies should be "sanctioned and restrained".

== Chief Executive campaign ==
On 28 November 2011, Leung officially announced his candidacy for Chief Executive of Hong Kong, two years after he had first hinted at his interest in the post.

The election campaign was controversial and bitterly fought. The early favourite to win was long-considered to be former Chief Secretary Henry Tang, who was supported by the local bureaucracy, key property and business tycoons, and crucially, by the Beijing government. However, while Tang stumbled over the revelation of an illegal structure at his home, Leung faced similar problems at his residence.

Leung appointed Fanny Law, who attracted widespread criticisms for mishandling educational reforms when in office from 2002 to 2006, to his Office of the Chief-Executive Elect as Campaign Manager.

During the campaign, rumours persistently resurfaced that Leung was a closet member of the Chinese Communist Party. Section 31 of Chief Executive Election Ordinance (Chapter 569) stipulates that a CE election winner must "publicly make a statutory declaration to the effect that he is not a member of any political party".

Martin Lee, a pro-democracy politician, questioned the survival of the 'one country, two systems' principle if Leung were to be elected the CE, saying that Leung must have been a loyal CCP member for him to be appointed as the Secretary General of the Basic Law Consultative Committee in 1985 at the young age of 31. This view was supported by a former underground communist, Florence Leung, whose memoir recorded that Leung was also a secret member of the party. She explained that, in order for Leung to succeed Mao Junnian (whose identity as a communist had been revealed) as the Secretary General of the Basic Law Consultative Committee, he must also have been a party member, per the tradition of the party. She also cited Leung's vague remarks about the 1989 Tiananmen massacre as a clue to his membership, in contrast to Henry Tang's greater sympathy for the protest movement. She said that if Leung, as an underground party member, won the election then the leader of the Communist Party in Hong Kong would be in actual control. Leung consistently dismissed such claims as ungrounded.

The suggestion that Leung's loyalty was more to Beijing than Hong Kong has long dogged him. In 2010, Leung had been asked whether he would support the award of the Nobel Peace Prize to jailed Chinese dissident Liu Xiaobo. He replied that China's former paramount leader, Deng Xiaoping, should have been the first Chinese to win the award.

Towards the end of the election campaign, James Tien, the honorary chairman of the Liberal Party and a supporter of Henry Tang during the election, stated that members of the election committee had received phone calls from the Beijing government's Liaison Office demanding that they vote for Leung.

On 25 March 2012, Leung was declared Hong Kong's new Chief Executive, after securing 689 votes from the 1,200-member appointed election committee. Henry Tang garnered 285 votes and the third candidate, Democrat Albert Ho, just 76, of a total of 1,132 valid votes received.

Upon his selection, the online version of the People's Daily addressed Leung as "Comrade Leung Chun-ying". When the Chinese mass media pointed out that the title Comrade (or tongzhi, 同志) is reserved by the party for its own members, and that neither Tung Chee-hwa nor Donald Tsang had been thus addressed, the epithet "Comrade" was removed from the page.

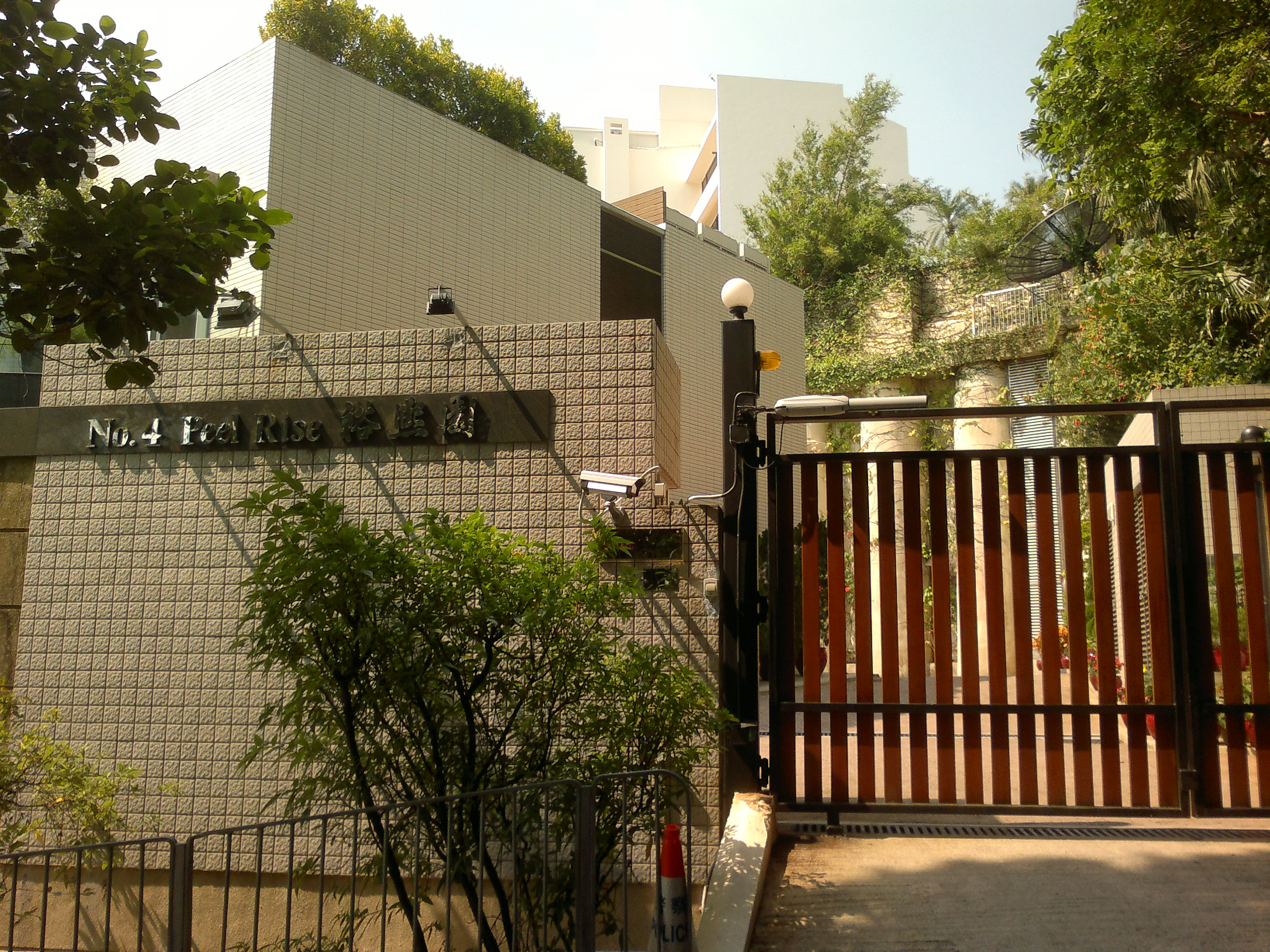
Leung's property at 4 Peel Rise, The Peak

After his selection, a number of illegal or unauthorised structures were found at Leung's house, in a reprise of the scandal involving an illegal basement that had badly hit the campaign of his rival, Tang, and for which Leung had roundly criticised Tang. The issue dominated the period around his taking up the post. Leung's structures were to be demolished. Chief Executive contender Albert Ho challenged Leung's legal legitimacy as the territory's new leader but his claim was rejected by the High Court.

== Chief Executive ==
=== Transition period ===
Leung assumed office as Chief Executive on 1 July 2012. On top of the controversy surrounding illegal structures of his house, in which he was severely criticised as a hypocrite for using the same accusation in attacking his opponent during the 2012 election, there were additional disputes regarding his appointments of officers and political judgements.

Leung's appointment of Chen Ran (陳冉) as the Project Officer in his Transitional Office stirred up further criticism among the public of Hong Kong. Chen has resided in Hong Kong for less than seven years, the minimum time period which foreigners are required to reside to apply for permanent residence. Chen is a former General Secretary of the pro-Beijing Hong Kong Young Elites Association (香港菁英會), of which Leung is a patron. Chen is the daughter of a middle-ranking government official in Shanghai and a former member of the Communist Youth League.

Despite the centuries-long history of Cantonese as the de facto spoken language of Hong Kong, Leung made his inaugural speech in Mandarin, spoken in mainland China. This was in stark contrast to his predecessor, Sir Donald Tsang, who made his inaugural speech in Cantonese in July 2007.

=== Public relations ===
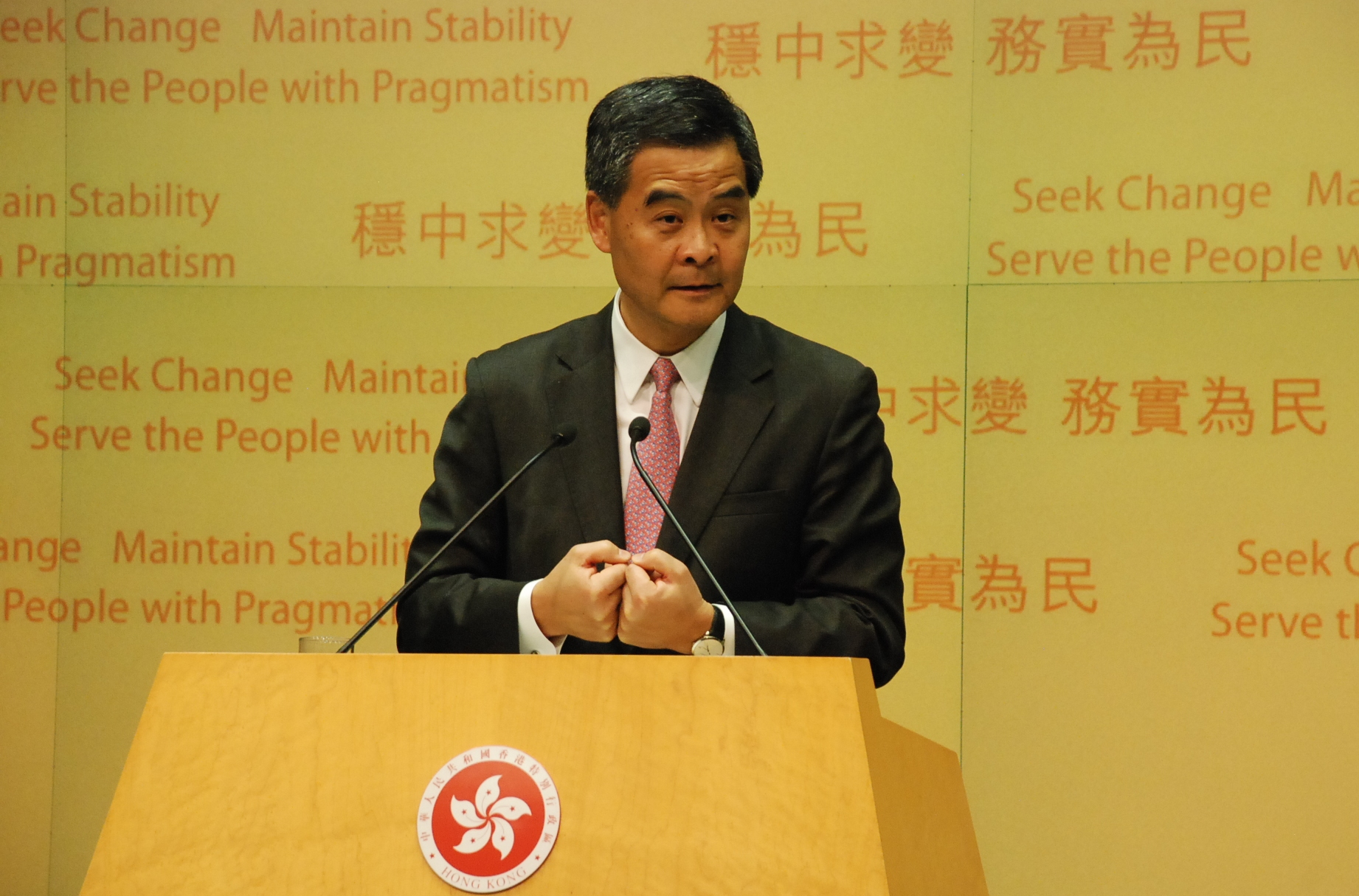
Leung Chun-ying at the 2013 Policy Address.

Leung's popularity ratings have been continuously low since his election. In October 2013, only 31 percent of the 1,009 participants in the HKU poll said they supported Leung as the city's leader, while 55 percent disapproved of him – an increase of 6 percentage points from the previous month's poll. Leung accepted HKD50 million in a deal with Australian engineering firm UGL in 2011. On 8 October 2014, an Australian newspaper revealed how the contract was made, but Leung has denied having done anything morally or legally wrong. He sidestepped key questions, such as why he did not declare the payment to the Executive Council. This controversy has further worsened Leung's popularity.

In a media interview during the pro-democracy occupation, Leung attempted to justify the conservative electoral model for Hong Kong by stating "if it's entirely a numbers game – numeric representation – then obviously you'd be talking to half the people in Hong Kong [who] earn less than US$1,800 a month [the median wage in HK]. You would end up with that kind of politics and policies". The comments proved controversial and were considered insensitive and snobbish. South China Morning Post columnist Alex Lo said of this interview: "Leung has set the gold standard on how not to do a media interview for generations of politicians to come." Lord Patten, the last British governor of Hong Kong, questioned Leung's leadership skill and capacity as Hong Kong's incumbent Chief Executive. In December 2014, Leung's popularity ratings plunged to a new low, down to 39.7 percent, with a net of minus 37%. This was attributed to public perception of Leung's unwillingness to heal the wounds, and his unwarranted shifting of the blame for the wrongs in society onto opponents. Leung also claimed negative effects on the economy without providing evidence, and his assertions were contradicted by official figures.

=== Karolinska Institutet controversy ===
In February 2015, the Karolinska Institutet announced it had received a record US$50 million donation from Lau Ming-wai, who chairs Hong Kong property developer Chinese Estates Holdings, and would establish a research centre in the city. On 16 February, a popular tabloid magazine Next Magazine revealed that Leung's son Chuen-yan had recently been awarded a fellowship from an independent foundation to research heart disease therapeutics at KI in Stockholm beginning that year, and raised questions about the "intricate relationship between the chief executive and powerful individuals". CY Leung had visited KI when in Sweden in 2014, and subsequently introduced KI president Anders Hamsten to Lau. The Democratic Party urged the ICAC to investigate the donation, suggesting that Leung may have used his public position to further his son's career. The Chief Executive's Office strenuously denied suggestions of any quid pro quo, saying that "the admission of the [Chief Executive's] son to post-doctoral research at KI is an independent decision by KI having regard to his professional standards. He [the son] plays no role and does not hold any position at the [proposed] Ming Wai Lau Center for Regenerative Medicine. This accusation has been questioned by the South China Morning Post. "The insinuation is that Leung Chuen-yan with a doctorate from Cambridge doesn't deserve his job at the Karolinska Institute...Leung the son probably could get similar junior posts in many other prestigious-sounding – at least to brand-obsessed Hongkongers – research institutes; it's not that big a deal."

=== Separation of powers ===
Under one country, two systems, Hong Kong has three branches of government as codified in the Basic Law. Zhang Xiaoming, the director of the Liaison Office of the Central People's Government, sparked controversy in Hong Kong after claiming in September 2015 that the Chief Executive of Hong Kong has a "special legal position which overrides administrative, legislative and judicial organs" and that separation of powers is "not suitable for Hong Kong". Beijing had previously described, in 2012, the role of Hong Kong judges as "administrators, whose basic political requirement [...] is loving the country". After Zhang's statement, Leung Chun-ying subsequently affirmed that his position is "transcendent" of the branches of the state.

The statements, which contradict the Basic Law, were widely criticised in Hong Kong. Chief Justice Geoffrey Ma responded that no one is above the law. The Hong Kong Bar Association stated that it "firmly believes that the common law principle of separation of powers will continue to be implemented within the constitutional framework of the Basic Law" and that the chief executive "cannot be said to be above the law [...] irrespective of the description of the political role". Alan Leong, leader of the Civic Party, accused Zhang of trying to provoke radicalisation in Hong Kong by stirring controversy. Legislator James Tien said that Leung should clarify his comment, because "obviously his authority is not above the executive, the legislature and the Judiciary".

Video of Leung's speech went viral on social media as Leung's media director, standing at his side, can be seen raising his eyebrows in visible disbelief when Leung asserts his "transcendence" of the branches of government.

=== Re-election ===
Leung was widely expected to run for re-election as Chief Executive in 2017. However, on 9 December 2016, he announced that he would not run, citing his desire to take care of his family and not to put his family through his "electioneering".

== Post-Chief Executive ==
In May 2020, Leung said that HSBC should publicly voice its support for the National Security Law, also saying "HSBC's China business can be replaced by banks from China or other countries overnight."

In October 2020, Leung announced that he would start a judicial review, though his company 803 Funds Limited, to force the Education Bureau to publicly identify teachers found guilty over incidents during the 2019-2020 Hong Kong protests. He also said during an interview that a teacher who had been de-registered for using Hong Kong independence materials in class should also be publicly identified. In addition, he said that teachers should "serve in accordance with the national security law."

On 13 October 2020, Leung publicly released the details of 18 teachers and tutors who were charged in the 2019-2020 Hong Kong protests, including naming some of their schools.

On 19 December 2020, it was reported that Leung served, since 2019, as director of two companies, Overseas Chinese Schools Limited and Overseas Chinese Schools (Lao PDR) Limited, but failed to report that to the government in accordance with the "Guidelines for Post-office Employment for Former Chief Executives and Politically Appointed Officials" policy. On 21 December 2020, two days after those reports, Leung finally notified the government of his positions.

In January 2021, Leung said that those from Hong Kong who gain British citizenship through the BN(O) program should be required to renounce their Hong Kong passport. In the same month, Leung said that Hong Kong's Chief Executive can be selected through consultations rather than by voting. In response, Helena Wong said that such a move would only put the city further away from democratic elections, an ultimate goal promised in the Basic Law.

In March 2021, Leung claimed that "In Hong Kong, by pushing on the democracy envelope too far, and by attempting to chip away the authority of Beijing in, for example, appointing the chief executive, many of the so-called democrats have become, in practice, separatists." Additionally in the same month, Leung inferred that the country and communist party are synonymous, claiming that "Many friends in Hong Kong, including some from the opposition camp, say they love Hong Kong very much... How did the Hong Kong they love so much come into existence? It exists under the People's Republic of China, which is being ruled by the Chinese Communist Party. The Hong Kong that we love so much, including our way of life and the capitalist system, was designed by the Chinese Communist Party."

Also in March 2021, Leung claimed that the proposed changes to overhaul the election system to allow only "patriots" to serve in the government could lead the way to universal suffrage, despite the election committee given potential powers to filter candidates from the Legislative Council.

In May 2021, Leung revived an earlier plan to build housing on less than 100 hectares of land on the fringes of country parks to in an attempt solve issues of housing in Hong Kong. Earlier in 2018, when the proposal was discussed, the Liber Research Community found almost 730 hectares of available land on brownfield sites, which would negate the need to build housing on country parks.

In October 2021, he was implicated in the Pandora Papers, exposing secret offshore accounts of various world leaders. He denied the allegations.

In December 2021, Leung criticized Nathan Law, using his social media account to question a picture of Law with a Christmas tree.

In August 2022, Leung criticized Nancy Pelosi for visiting Taiwan, saying "Pelosi's Taipei visit is not in service of human rights, democracy, or freedom of the people of Taiwan. It is for American interests." He also asked why China could not take Taiwan by military force.

In October 2022, Leung said overseas companies and key opinion leaders had misunderstandings about Hong Kong, saying "Not only do they not know, they have plenty of misunderstandings or superficial knowledge. Or they were misled, because of smearing campaigns by overseas media and politicians about what's really happening in Hong Kong." Leung said that Japan and South Korea "have many misunderstandings about our political situation."

In October 2022, Leung said that high level civil servants should give up their foreign passports, saying "Is it even possible for those officials with foreign nationality to say 'my allegiance is to China, not to these western countries' or 'my allegiance is to both China and these western countries'?" Earlier, Erick Tsang said that there was no plans to change nationality rules. Many high level government officials or their families have or had foreign nationalities, including spouses and children of Chief Executives.

In November 2022, Leung said that Hongkongers should not worry about the "7+3" quarantine system when going to mainland China, and said that Hong Kong government officials, members of the Executive Council, and businessmen should pay the "time cost" to visit mainland China and understand its developments.

In November 2022, Leung criticized the High Court for allowing Jimmy Lai to hire a lawyer from the UK. Earlier, when two British judges withdrew from the Court of Final Appeal, Leung said that it was "a stain on the independence of the British judiciary." Leung said it would be "ridiculous" to let a foreign lawyer represent Lai. Professor Johannes Chan Man-mun, former law dean of HKU, commented and said that public discussions to influence the court's decisions were "disturbing" and would undermine the rule of law and judicial independence.

In December 2022, Leung tested positive for COVID-19 after returning to Hong Kong from Singapore and Cambodia.

In January 2023, Leung dismissed concerns about emigration from Hong Kong to Singapore, saying that it "is solely temporary due to the pandemic situation in Hong Kong previously and relevant isolation policies."

In February 2023, Leung said that Hong Kong's political system was better than the UK's, and that the UK's system was "totally ineffective and dysfunctional."

In April 2023, Leung said that elections for District Councils were not necessary.

In May 2023, Leung urged UK police to investigate an event in the UK which planned to involve books with sheep, saying the books were illegal in Hong Kong.

In March 2024, Leung said that "I don't think the Hong Kong government can get away with paying taxpayers' money, whatever the cause is, without telling people how much." Leung also said "The Hong Kong government always tells the public how much money has been spent on what." A month later in April 2024, Leung's successor, Chief Executive John Lee said the government would not disclose how much it spent on buying rights to broadcast the 2024 Olympics. In addition, in April 2024, the Tourism Board did not reveal how much it spent to bring 2,000 influencers and celebrities to Hong Kong to make short videos.

In August 2025, Leung was recorded in Finland with his wife, confronting Falun Gong members, saying that he had their names and could investigate them later; police in Finland later said that the Falun Gong members were lawful.

In March 2026, Leung said Hong Kong should "proactively align with, and raise its hands" to contribute to national goals under China's 15th Five-Year Plan (2026–2030), even where the city is not explicitly named, adding that its role in national development is "not confined" to its traditional strengths in finance, shipping, and trade.

On 6 September 2026, at a Hong Kong–Fujian cooperation seminar in Wan Chai, Leung described Hong Kong as Fujian's "preferred super-connector" for the province's global expansion, expressing hope for new forms of cooperation between the two regions.

Following the death of former Chief Executive Tung Chee-hwa on 8 September 2026, Leung expressed his condolences on social media, praising Tung's role in implementing "one country, two systems" and describing him as "kindhearted and persuasive through reason, a true example for the younger generation." Leung was subsequently named one of four deputy directors of Tung's state funeral committee, alongside Chief Executive John Lee, CPPCC Secretary-General Wang Dongfeng, and Hong Kong and Macao Affairs Office director Xia Baolong, under committee chairman Shi Taifeng. He was also among the pallbearers at Tung's funeral rites.

On 14 September 2026, Leung attended the opening of a new footbridge linking Kowloon Bay MTR station, Amoy Plaza, and the East Kowloon Cultural Centre — a project he said he had proposed during his tenure as Chief Executive — calling it a "shared victory" for government, business, and the community.

== Personal life ==
In 1981, Leung married Regina Ching Yee Higgins whose father was a Royal Hong Kong Police officer. Investigating into her background, Apple Daily revealed that Higgins, commonly believed to have the surname Tong, actually had changed her name to Higgins at the age of three, through which she successfully acquired UK nationality. She thus qualified to study in the UK as a British national, and as such may have benefited from reduced tuition fees. Her name on the couple's marriage certificate bears the name "Regina Ching Yee Higgins". After her marriage to Leung, she changed her name to Leung Tong Ching Yee Regina. Neither Tong nor the office of the chief executive has responded to questions as to her name changes. Despite Leung's grave unpopular ratings as Hong Kong's Chief Executive, his wife has publicly defended him.

The couple has two daughters, elder Chai-yan and younger Chung-yan, as well as a son. During the 1990s, Leung had publicly ruled out sending his children to school abroad, yet years later his own children studied in Britain and then worked overseas. Upon his election to chief executive in 2012, Leung declared that his wife and children were Chinese nationals.

Chai-yan regularly attracted media attention for her brazen public comportment. She has posted remarks on her Facebook account and has appeared in several magazine interviews, in which she talked about her depression and her stormy relationship with her parents, principally her mother. In 2014, Chai-yan posted an image supposedly of her in a bathtub with wrists slashed. In March 2015, she posted a flurry of Facebook messages after a row with her mother in which she alleged she was kicked, slapped and sworn at; police and ambulance service were called to Government House. After her Facebook page was taken down, she posted an Instagram message to the effect that she had left home definitively. CY Leung pleaded with the media and the public for some space. Chai-yan died in April 2025 at the age of 33.

=== Bag-gate ===
Leung was embroiled in the "bag-gate" controversy in 2016 as Chung-yan was about to board a flight in the Hong Kong International Airport for San Francisco. In the early hours of 28 March, Chung-yan left her hand baggage departure hall after she passed through the security checkpoint. According to Apple Daily, witnesses alleged that Leung's wife Regina, who accompanied their daughter to the airport, engaged in a lengthy argument with airport staff to have staff reunite her daughter with her missing bag. Staff insisted on upholding procedure for the passenger to exit the secured zone to recover any missing item and pass through security again. Chung-yan telephoned her father for help, and passed the phone to the airline staff. The staff then brought Leung her bag, making clear that they had made an exception; she boarded her flight minutes later.

Leung denied abusing power by ordering airline staff to retrieve Chung-yan's bag in violation of security guidelines. Following the news of the incident, the Airport Authority issued a statement denying that it was against existing procedure for anyone other than the passenger to retrieve any missing baggage from airport security and bring it into the restricted area and through security check. In an apparent allusion to the incident, People's Daily wrote a commentary stating that it would be better if there was a bit less of "special procedures for special things". Hong Kong Cabin Crew Federation called for direct talks with the Civil Aviation Department's director general regarding the "dangerous precedent" set by Leung. Hundreds of members of the union were joined by supporters in a sit-in protest at the airport attended by between 1,000 and 2,500 people. Leung's popularity as chief executive plunged to a new record low during the month of April, after the incident was made public. The Federation filed a judicial review to challenge the decision by the Airport Authority and was ruled in favour by the judge in 2018.

== Nicknames ==
Early in his career in early 1980, when he started earning an annual salary of HK$10 million, he was given the nickname "Working-class emperor" (打工皇帝).

Later, during his campaign for CE elections, across the territory he is nicknamed "The Wolf" by some opponents – alluding to his cunning and deviousness, and as a pun of his name and the Chinese word for wolf. Others refer to him as Dracula, given his prominent eye teeth. Leung has also been associated with and caricatured as Lufsig – an IKEA plush toy – after one was thrown at him by an anti-government protester in December 2013 during a town hall meeting. Lufsig is a plush wolf, whose original given Chinese name in mainland China "路姆西" resembles profanity in Cantonese, much to the delight of the Hong Kong citizens who dislike him.

Since becoming chief executive, Leung was bestowed the pejorative moniker "689", referring to the meagre number of votes that elected him into office, and is also used ironically to symbolise the lack of representation of the will of Hong Kong people at large. Puma, which posted an image of a facsimile runners identification tag bearing the number "D7689" onto its Facebook page to publicise its involvement in the 2015 Hong Kong marathon received a complaint that it was disrespectful to Leung, since "D7" was perceived to be the initials of a Cantonese profanity. Lampooning the complaint, members of the public scoured the city and found many examples of innocent occurrences of the irreverent number.

== See also ==
Quotations related to Leung Chun-ying at Wikiquote

- Leung administration
- Politics of Hong Kong
- Carrie Lam

Political offices
Preceded by Mao Junnian	Secretary-General of Hong Kong Basic Law Consultative Committee; 1988–1990	Committee abolished
Preceded by Chung Sze-yuen	Non-Official Convenor of Executive Council; 1999–2011	Succeeded by Ronald Arculli
Preceded by Donald Tsang	Chief Executive of Hong Kong; 2012–2017	Succeeded by Carrie Lam
Preceded by Donald Tsang	President of Executive Council; 2012–2017	Succeeded by Carrie Lam
Legislative Council of Hong Kong
New parliament	Member of Provisional Legislative Council; 1997–1998	Replaced by Legislative Council
Order of precedence
Preceded by Donald Tsang; Former Chief Executives	Hong Kong order of precedence Former Chief Executives	Succeeded by Carrie Lam; Former Chief Executives
