= Li Hou =

Chinese politician

Li Hou (Chinese: 李后, June 1923 – 27 September 2009) was a Chinese Communist Party politician.

Li Hou was born in Zhucheng, Shandong Province of China in 1923. He began involving in revolutionary activities in 1937 and joined the Chinese Communist Party (CCP) in the following year and worked in the 57th Northeastern Red Army. After 1941, he served in the Propaganda Department of the Shandong Sub-bureau under the CCP Central Committee. He worked as a reporter and chief editor of the local newspaper, Shandong Dazhong Daily from 1942 until the CCP seized power over China in 1949. After the founding of the People's Republic of China, he served consecutively as chief editor of the Xinhua News Agency Shandong Branch Office and member of the editorial board of the Dazhong Daily between 1949 and 1951.

Li was promoted to deputy section chief of the Foreign Affairs Office under the State Council in 1958. In 1978, he became the deputy secretary-general and later deputy director and secretary general of the Hong Kong and Macao Affairs Office in 1980. Xu participated in the Sino-British and Sino-Portuguese negotiations which resulted in the Sino-British Joint Declaration and the Sino-Portuguese Joint Declaration agreeing on the transfer of Hong Kong and Macao to the People's Republic of China in 1997 and 1999 respectively. He became the secretary-general of Committee for Drafting Basic Law of Hong Kong Special Administrative Region.

Li was elected representative of the 13th National Congress of the Chinese Communist Party in 1987 and was a deputy to the 7th and 8th National People's Congress.

Li died in Beijing on 27 September 2009 at 2 p.m. at the age of 86.
