= Kwan Ko Siu-wah =

Hong Kong politician, educator, and social worker (1924–2019)

Kwan Ko Siu-wah, SBS, OBE, JP (Chinese: 關高苕華; 1924 – 22 December 2019) was a Hong Kong politician, educator and social worker.

Ko Siu-wah was born in Surabaya, Dutch Indonesia in a Chinese Indonesian family in 1924. She was sent to study in Guangzhou and subsequently at the Pooi To Middle School in Hong Kong. She was later educated at the Yenching University with the degree in Social Work and Sociology. She taught at the Pooi To Middle School before she received social work training in the United Kingdom and the United States. She took her husband name Kwan Bing-kwong when they married on 19 September 1947. The couple has one son, Kwan Kay-cheong.

She joined the Hong Kong Young Women's Christian Association (YWCA) in 1952 and became its long-time general secretary in 1962. She was also chairwoman of the Hong Kong Council of Social Service. In 1965, she was awarded the Member of the Order of the British Empire (MBE) for her social services in Hong Kong.

She was first made unofficial Justice of the Peace in 1969. From 1972 to 1974, she was appointed member of the Urban Council, succeeding Catherine Joyce Symons. In 1974, she became an unofficial member of the Legislative Council of Hong Kong until 1978. During her service on the Legislative Council, she was concerned about the youth and women issues, community affairs, family and education matters. She demanded equal pay for men and women and maternity leave for women. For her public services, she was awarded Officer of the Order of the British Empire (OBE) in 1976.

She was also chairwoman of the Hong Kong Christian Council and the Hong Kong Christian Service. She had been member of the Councils of the University of Hong Kong and the Hong Kong Baptist College.

During the transition period, she was appointed by Beijing to the Hong Kong Basic Law Consultative Committee (BLCC) in 1985. In 1991, she was also appointed supplementary member of the Chinese People's Political Consultative Conference (CPPCC) National Committee and Hong Kong Affairs Adviser in 1994. After the handover, she had been vice chairwoman of the Basic Law Promotion Steering Committee. In 2001, she was awarded Silver Bauhinia Star (SBS) Award by the Hong Kong SAR government.

She died in December 2019 at the age of 94.
