= Mo Kwan-nin =

Hong Kong politician

Mo Kwan-nin (Chinese: 毛鈞年), GBM (20 May 1937 – 5 February 2013) was a Hong Kong born People's Republic of China politician.

Mo Kwan-nin was born in Hong Kong in 1937 and graduated from the Chinese Department of the University of Hong Kong in 1961. He later joined the Methodist College in Yau Ma Tei as a Chinese language and Chinese history teacher. He was put in charge of the school's curriculum.

In 1984, Mo joined the Hong Kong office of the Xinhua News Agency, the de facto representative office of People's Republic China government in the colonial period. He was appointed as deputy director in 1987, becoming the highest ranking Hong Kong born official at that time. It was seen as a Chinese Communist Party (CCP) gesture to show its recognition of Hongkongers. Mo served alongside Lu Ping as the deputy secretary-general of the Hong Kong Basic Law Drafting Committee and the secretary-general of the Hong Kong Basic Law Consultative Committee, the two organs responsible for drafting the Hong Kong's mini-constitution under Chinese rule after 1997.

Hong Kong–based political commentator Johnny Lau Yui-siu said Mo became an underground member of the CCP after he joined Xinhua. However, it was not disclosed until the China News Service accidentally exposed his membership in a report during the 13th National Congress of the CCP. According to Lau, Mo's role became less significant after the disclosure. Mo's support of the Tiananmen Square protests of 1989 also significantly diverged from Beijing's and his career was in limbo after that. In 2000, Mo was honoured with the Grand Bauhinia Medal.

Mo died from an undisclosed illness on 2 February 2013 7:02 p.m. in a local hospital at the age of 75. Johnny Lau praised Mo, saying he had served Beijing with pure intention, which was rare at that time. "What he had given to the country was much more than what he could earn back," Lau said. Chief Executive Leung Chun-ying also paid tribute, saying that Mo was committed to serve Hong Kong and involved in the preparatory work for the transfer of sovereignty. "He has made outstanding contributions to both the country and Hong Kong," Leung said.
