= Group of 190 =

Political coalition in Hong Kong

The Group of 190 was a coalition emerged during the discussion of the drafting of the Hong Kong Basic Law and constitutional reform in the transition period of Hong Kong in the 1980s. The coalition was formed in response to the Group of 89 which advocated a more conservative approach to the constitutional reform. It was later transformed into today's pro-democracy camp in the 1990s.

The group is considered as broadly liberal and wished to ensure stability and prosperity and high degree of autonomy by making greater changes to the political system, including the extension of full "one person one vote" democracy. However, it was a small group compared to the Group of 89 without resources that the business elites commanded. Having few members in the Hong Kong Basic Law Consultative Committee (BLCC) and Hong Kong Basic Law Drafting Committee (BLDC), the Group put forward the "Liberal model" of the political system for the future government in 1997. The Group's compromise of its demands over the three years of the consultative process of the Basic Law. was affected by the Tiananmen protests of 1989, and Szeto Wah and Martin Lee, representatives of the liberal movement in the BLDC, were expelled from the committee.

The group also had few successes in the local elections. However its comparative success in the local elections was diluted by the government's appointment of the balance of the District Board membership. In the electoral college elections in September 1988, the Group was defeated by narrow majorities. However, Martin Lee won a seat in the Legal functional constituency and also one of the commercial seats.

== See also ==
- Democratic development in Hong Kong
- Joint Committee on the Promotion of Democratic Government
