= Raymond Wu (politician) =

Hong Kong pro-Beijing politician and doctor

Raymond Wu Wai-yung, GBS (15 May 1936 – 3 October 2006) was a Hong Kong pro-Beijing politician and doctor.

== Education ==
Wu was educated at the Wah Yan College, Hong Kong and graduated from the University of Hong Kong with the Bachelor of Medicine, Bachelor of Surgery (MBBS) in 1963. He served as president of the Hong Kong Medical Association from 1984 to 1988. In 1997, he was decorated the Officer of the Order of the British Empire for his services to psychiatric rehabilitation in Hong Kong.

== Career ==
In the preparatory period for the transfer of sovereignty over Hong Kong and establishment of the Special Administrative Region (SAR), Wu was member of the Hong Kong Basic Law Drafting Committee and Hong Kong Basic Law Consultative Committee which were responsible for Hong Kong's mini-constitution in the Chinese rule after 1997. He was also the member of the Preparatory Committee for the HKSAR.

Wu was a Hong Kong delegate to the 9th and 10th National People's Congresses (NPC) and member of the Hong Kong Basic Law Committee of the NPC Standing Committee.

Since the handover, Wu had served as member of the Hospital Authority from 1997 to 2005 and the chairman of the Community Investment and Inclusion Fund Committee since its establishment in 2002.

In his later life, Wu was famous for his hard line comments in support of the Beijing and Hong Kong governments and opposition to public campaigns advocating an early introduction of full democracy. He also argued that no guarantee universal suffrage could return a patriot to serve as the Chief Executive of Hong Kong. He supported the move to seek Beijing's interpretation of the Hong Kong Basic Law in 2005 when a row emerged over the tenure of the successor to former Chief Executive Tung Chee-hwa.

Wu died of blood cancer in Queen Mary Hospital on 3 October 2006 at the age of 69.
