= Dorothy Liu =

Hong Kong lawyer and politician

Dorothy Liu Yiu-chu

Hong Kong Deputy of the National People's Congress
- In office 1982–1997

Personal details
- Born: 8 July 1934 Hong Kong
- Died: 30 March 1997 (aged 62) Queen Mary Hospital, Pok Fu Lam, Hong Kong
- Education: University of Hong Kong; University of Oxford; Harvard Law School
- Occupation: Politician, solicitor

Dorothy Liu Yiu-chu (Chinese: 廖瑤珠; 8 July 1934 – 30 March 1997) was a prominent Hong Kong pro-Beijing politician and lawyer. She was well known for her independent and outspoken image, as she was one of the few members of the pro-Beijing camp who was willing to stand up to Beijing.

== Early career ==
A Hakka of Huiyang ancestry, Liu was born in Hong Kong on 8 July 1934. Her father, Dr. Liu Yan-tak was on good terms with senior officials of the People's Republic of China and took her to meetings with him. She was named Dorothy because the initial letter D is the fourth in the alphabet, and Dorothy was the fourth of the six children. She later dropped her English name to emphasize her Chineseness, but it was still commonly used in the local media and she was nicknamed Dotty, partly because it evoked her eccentric character.

Liu graduated from the University of Hong Kong in 1956 and went on to study English literature at Oxford University. At her father's prompting, she later obtained a second degree in Law at Harvard University. She returned to Hong Kong and began practising law in the 1960s and was senior partner of the Liu, Chan & Lam law firm. Liu declared her pro-Beijing convictions during the 1967 Leftist riots, although she disagreed with the terrorist tactics of the Leftists. Liu was taking a risk by expressing her pro-Beijing sympathies as the colonial government and most of the public were anti-Communists.

== Politics ==
In the 1980s, Liu was invited to join the preparatory work for setting up the Hong Kong constitution after 1997 when it was handed over to Chinese rule. She was member of the Hong Kong Basic Law Drafting Committee in 1985 and was selected as Hong Kong deputy to the National People's Congress (NPC) in 1982 which she served until her death in 1997.

During the Tiananmen Square protests of 1989, Liu supported the Beijing government's decision to impose martial law in Beijing, but she condemned the bloody suppression on 4 June. In the annual NPC meeting early the following year, Liu attacked a decision to purge a senior Chinese deputy for his role in the unrest. In 1991, she called for a minute's silence for the victims of Tiananmen at the NPC meeting. It was considered rebellious in the hard-line political climate.

Liu was trusted by the Beijing authorities with her genuine patriotism. She once told a local newspaper "[w]hen it's a question of conflict between Britain and China, I have made it clear I will, without reservation, always be on China's side." However, in her later years, she became increasingly critical of Beijing's policy on Hong Kong. "There will be fluctuating times: when the central government [in Peking] may be more dictatorial towards Hong Kong; may fail to allow us to have the high degree of autonomy promised to us," she warned in a newspaper interview published in December 1996.

Liu was also critical of onetime supporters of the colonial administration who switched allegiance as the handover approached, who she called "old batteries". She also wept when seated next to a former top adviser to the British, Sir Chung Sze-yuen, at a committee meeting for making arrangements for the transition. However, her resentment was seen to be aimed as much at Beijing, for welcoming such people. Although she opposed the last governor Chris Patten's political reform for the 1995 Legislative election, Liu also questioned the legitimacy of Beijing's decision to replace Hong Kong's 1995 elected legislature with an appointed Provisional Legislative Council. She warned there would be "lots of puppets" in the new government. She was left out of the Preparatory Committee for the HKSAR as she became increasingly critical of Beijing.

Liu developed pancreatic cancer in 1996. She lapsed into a coma on 29 March 1997 and died at 2:50 a.m. in Queen Mary Hospital, Hong Kong on 31 March at the age of 62, just three months before the handover of Hong Kong. She married once and had one son. However, Liu asked for her ashes to be scattered in San Francisco where her son lives, as she said she did not want her remains to "take up land in China, which is precious to poor farmers".

Liu's brother, Benjamin Liu Tsz-ming, was a judge of the Court of Appeal. He died 16 October 2013. The Liu family are relatives of prominent Republican China strongman, Liao Zhongkai.
