= Fei Yi-ming =

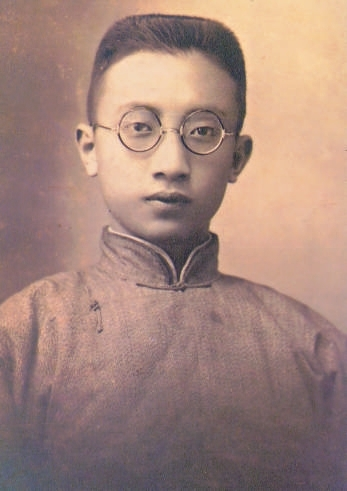
Fei Yi-ming (c. 1920s)

Fei Yi-ming (Chinese: 費彝民; 1908 – 18 May 1988) was the managing director of the pro-Beijing Tai Kung Pao in Hong Kong.

He was born in Jiangsu Province of China in 1908. He later moved to Hong Kong and was in charge of the pro-Beijing Tai Kung Pao.

In April 1952, he and the chief editor of the newspaper Lee Tsung-ying were convicted after they reprinted an article from the People's Daily, the official newspaper in the Communist China which accused the British colonial government in Hong Kong of "savagely brutal offenses" and planning a "systemic massacre" on 1 March. They were given the option of paying a fine or going to jail, choosing the former. The Ta Kung Pao was suspended for six months, which later reduced to 12 days.

During the 1967 Hong Kong riots, Fei Yi-ming served as an executive committee member of the Committee of Hong Kong and Kowloon Compatriots from All Circles for Struggle Against British Hong Kong Persecution.

He was also the Hong Kong and Macao representative to the National People's Congress. Fei Yi-ming served as the vice-chairman of the Hong Kong Basic Law Drafting Committee from 1985 until his death in 1988.
