= Hu Sheng =

Chinese Marxist theorist and politician (1918–2000)

Hu Sheng 胡绳
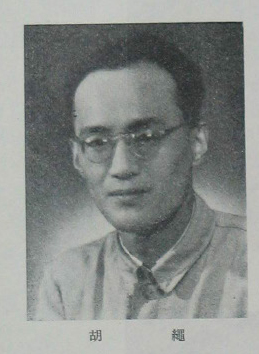
- Hu Sheng

Member of the 12th Central Committee of the Chinese Communist Party
- In office 1982–1987

Vice Chairman of the Chinese People's Political Consultative Conference
- In office 10 April 1988 – 13 March 1998
- Chairman: Li Xiannian; Li Ruihuan

President of the Chinese Academy of Social Sciences
- In office 1985–1998
- Preceded by: Hu Qiaomu
- Succeeded by: Li Tieying

Personal details
- Born: January 11, 1918 Suzhou, China
- Died: November 5, 2000 (aged 82) Shanghai, China
- Party: Chinese Communist Party
- Occupation: Politician, historian, writer

Hu Sheng (11 January 1918 – 5 November 2000), was a Chinese Marxist theorist and historian. He was President of the Chinese Academy of Social Sciences from 1985 to 1998, and also served as Vice-Chairman of the seventh and eighth National Committees of the Chinese People's Political Consultative Conference and member of the 12th Central Committee of the Chinese Communist Party.

== Biography ==
Hu was born on 11 January 1918 in Suzhou, Jiangsu Province. He enrolled in the philosophy Department of Peking University in the year of 1934. He started involving in the communist revolutionary activities in Shanghai from 1935, mainly in the cultural activities and campaigns of resistance led by the Chinese Communist Party against the Japanese. After the Second Sino-Japanese War broke out in 1937, he moved to Central China and joined the Chinese Communist Party. From the age of 17 to 30, Hu wrote numerous articles for the Communist and other progressive newspapers and magazines and his published works summed up more than 1 million Chinese characters and had a great impact on ideological and cultural circles as well as young intellectuals.

Hu was responsible for the Party's theory research and publicity works for a long time after the People's Republic of China was formed in 1949. He also wrote a number of major works on Chinese and the Chinese Communist Party's history. He was the president of the Chinese Academy of Social Sciences from 1985 to 1998. In 1996, Hu donated most of his books to a library in Hubei Province and established a fund to award outstanding young intellectuals.

He became the member of the 12th Central Committee of the Chinese Communist Party from 1982 to 1987. In 1988, he became the vice-chairman of the National Committee of the 7th Chinese People's Political Consultative Conference. He served for the second term and retired from office in 1998. He was also vice chairman of the Hong Kong Basic Law Drafting Committee which was responsible for drafting the Hong Kong Basic Law, the constitution of the Hong Kong Special Administrative Region after it was handed over to China in 1997.

Hu died of an illness on 5 November 2000 in Shanghai at the age of 82. Entrusted by the party's Central Committee, the Vice President Hu Jintao came to Shanghai to bid farewell to Hu Sheng, and to convey to Hu Sheng's family members. There were also concerns expressed from General Secretary Jiang Zemin and other members of the Politburo Standing Committee of the party's Central Committee.
