= Wong Po-yan =

Hong Kong businessman and politician (1923–2019)

The Honourable Wong Po-yan GBM, CBE, JP
- 黃保欣

Deputy of Hong Kong to the NPC
- In office 8 December 1997 – 3 December 2002; 9th National People's Congress

Member of the Legislative Council
- In office 10 October 1979 – 25 August 1988
- Appointed by: Sir Murray MacLehose; Sir Edward Youde

Personal details
- Born: 5 May 1923 Hwei-An, Fujien, Mainland China
- Died: 21 July 2019 (aged 96)
- Education: National University of Amoy
- Occupation: Director

Wong Po-yan GBM CBE JP (Chinese: 黃保欣, 5 May 1923 – 21 July 2019) was a Hong Kong industrialist and politician. He was the first chairman of Airport Authority Hong Kong from 1995 to 1999.

== Biography ==
Wong Po-yan was born in and brought up in Hwei-An, Fujien, China and studied Chemistry at the National University of Amoy before he moved to Hong Kong. He became a successful industrialist with his plastic material company United Oversea Enterprises, Ltd. that he founded in 1958.

In 1962, he was elected to the general committee of the Chinese Manufacturers' Association of Hong Kong (CMA). As the representative of the CMA, he was appointed as the member of the Hong Kong Trade Development Council. He was appointed to the Legislative Council by Governor Murray MacLehose in 1979 and served until 1988.

After the United Kingdom and the People's Republic of China agreed to hand over the sovereignty of Hong Kong in 1997, Wong was appointed by the PRC government to the Hong Kong Basic Law Drafting Committee which was responsible for drafting the Hong Kong constitution after 1997. He subsequently became the member of the Preparatory Committee in 1996 which prepared for the transition of the sovereignty.

During the transition period, Wong Po-yan was appointed the chairman of the Provisional Airport Authority in 1995 to oversee the construction and opening of the Chek Lap Kok Airport. He was blamed for the chaotic opening of the airport in 1998. He was also the chairman of Asia Television between 1998 and 2002.

He was the Hong Kong deputy to the 9th National People's Congress from 1997 to 2002 and the deputy director of the Hong Kong Basic Law Committee under the Standing Committee of the National People's Congress from 1997 to 2006.

He was awarded the Grand Bauhinia Medal in 1998.

Political offices
New creation	Chairman of Airport Authority Hong Kong; 1995–1999	Succeeded by Victor Fung
Business positions
Preceded by Lim Por-yen	Chairman of the Asia Television; 1998–2002	Succeeded by Chan Wing-kee
