= Rayson Huang =

Hong Kong chemist

Life Member of the Court of HKU
- In office 9 January 1987 – 8 April 2015 Serving with Kan Yuet-keung, Yang Ti-liang and Victor Fung

Vice-Chancellor of The University of Hong Kong
- In office September 1972 – 1986
- Preceded by: Kenneth Robinson
- Succeeded by: Wang Gungwu

Vice-Chancellor of the Nanyang University
- In office 1969–1972
- Preceded by: Huang Ying-jung
- Succeeded by: Shou-sheng Hsueh

Personal details
- Born: 1 September 1920
- Died: 8 April 2015 (aged 94) United Kingdom
- Spouse: Grace Li
- Education: BSc (HK); DPhil, DSc (Oxon); DSc (UM)

Rayson Lisung Huang
- Traditional Chinese: 黃麗松
- Simplified Chinese: 黄丽松
Transcriptions
Standard Mandarin
- Hanyu Pinyin: Huáng Lìsōng
Yue: Cantonese
- Jyutping: wong4 lai6 cung4

Rayson Lisung Huang, CBE (Chinese: 黃麗松; pinyin: Huáng Lìsōng; 1 September 1920 − 8 April 2015), was a Hong Kong chemist, who was an expert on radicals. He was the first Chinese Vice-Chancellor of The University of Hong Kong, a position in which he served from 1972 until 1986.

== Early years ==
Huang's family came from Tangpu Village, Yuhu Town, Rongcheng District, Jieyang, Guangdong. He completed his primary and secondary education at Munsang College, where his father was the founding principal. He later attended St. John's University in Shanghai in 1937, but his studies were interrupted by the Japanese invasion. After 1938 he continued his studies as a scholarship student at The University of Hong Kong. In Hong Kong Huang majored in chemistry at St. John's Hall (now called St. John's College). In addition to his academic studies, Huang was an accomplished violinist. Following the Japanese invasion of Hong Kong in 1941, Huang briefly worked with British auxiliary forces and was responsible for detecting chemical weapons. In 1942 his studies at the University were interrupted when the school was forced to close. Huang returned to China in 1942 and arrived in Guangxi. By 1945 Huang had followed other members of The University of Hong Kong chemistry department to Britain and received a scholarship to study at the University of Oxford's Institute of Chemistry. He received at doctorate in chemistry and subsequently pursued his post-doctoral research at the University of Chicago. During his study in Chicago, he met his future wife Grace Wei Huang.

== Academic career ==
In 1951, Huang taught chemistry at the University of Malaya in Singapore (now National University of Singapore) and later he was transferred to University of Malaya's Kuala Lumpur campus. He became a tenured professor of chemistry and then acting Vice-Chancellor and Dean of the Faculty of Science.

== University administrator ==
In 1969 Huang was appointed as Vice-Chancellor at Nanyang University in Singapore.

In September 1972 Huang became the first Chinese Vice-Chancellor of the University of Hong Kong and quelled a student demonstration during a royal visit to Hong Kong. In addition, he served in various capacities including becoming a member of the Hong Kong Basic Law Drafting Committee in drafting Hong Kong's post handover constitution. Rayson Huang and his wife retired in 1994 and lived with their son.

== Retirement and post-academic life ==
By 1999 the Huangs returned to Hong Kong. His wife Grace who was suffering from senile dementia then died in Hong Kong.

To commemorate his wife's life, Rayson Huang established the Grace Wei Huang Memorial Fund. and authored a memoir, A Lifetime in Academia: An autobiography by Rayson Huang, the proceeds from which will be set aside for the fund.

Huang had a wide range of hobbies, one of the most special having been the study of violin making. He returned to Hong Kong on a regular basis. Huang also established the Progress of Hong Kong's Rayson Huang and the "Rayson Huang Foundation" in Malaysia.

Academic offices
Preceded by Kenneth E. Robinson	Vice-chancellor of The University of Hong Kong; 1972–1986	Succeeded by Wang Gungwu
