= Li Yumin =

Chinese academic and translator of French literature

- 李玉民
- Born: China
- Education: Peking University
- Occupation: Translator
- Writing career
- Language: Chinese, French
- Genre: Novel
- Notable works: The Hunchback of Notre-Dame; Les Misérables; The Three Musketeers; The Count of Monte Cristo

Li Yumin (Chinese: 李玉民; pinyin: Lǐ Yùmín) is a Chinese translator and professor at the Capital Normal University. He was one of the main translators of the works of French literature into Chinese, including The Hunchback of Notre-Dame, Les Misérables, The Three Musketeers, and The Count of Monte Cristo.

== Biography ==
In 1963, Li graduated from Peking University, where he majored in French language. After university, he was sent abroad to study at the University of Rennes 1 on government scholarships.

== Translations ==
- Victor Hugo (2017). The Hunchback of Notre-Dame 巴黎圣母院 (in Chinese). Xi'an, Shaanxi: Xi'an Jiaotong University Press. ISBN 9787560575667.
- Victor Hugo (2013). Les Misérables 悲惨世界 (in Chinese). Beijing: Beijing Yanshan Publishing House. ISBN 9787540225377.
- Victor Hugo (2018). The Man Who Laughs 笑面人 (in Chinese). Tianjin: Tianjin People's Publishing House. ISBN 9787201134239.
- Alexandre Dumas (2015). The Three Musketeers 三个火枪手 (in Chinese). Beijing: People's Literature Publishing House. ISBN 9787020101979.
- Alexandre Dumas (2017). The Count of Monte Cristo 基督山伯爵 (in Chinese). Xi'an, Shaanxi: Xi'an Jiaotong University Press.
- Alexandre Dumas fils (2017). La Dame aux Camélias 茶花女 (in Chinese). Xi'an, Shaanxi: Xi'an Jiaotong University Press. ISBN 9787560574936.
- Alphonse Daudet (2017). The Last Lesson 最后一课 (in Chinese). Xi'an, Shaanxi: Xi'an Jiaotong University Press. ISBN 9787560573564.
- Albert Camus (2018). Outsiders / Plague 局外人·鼠疫 (in Chinese). Beijing: Time Literature and Art Publishing House. ISBN 9787538755886.
- Guy De Maupassant (2017). Selection of Maupassant's Short Stories 莫泊桑短篇小说选 (in Chinese). Xi'an, Shaanxi: Xi'an Jiaotong University Press. ISBN 9787560573854.
- Guy De Maupassant (2017). Bel-Ami 漂亮朋友 (in Chinese). Xi'an, Shaanxi: Xi'an Jiaotong University Press. ISBN 9787560576169.
- Andre Gide (2018). La Symphonie pastorale 田园交响曲 (in Chinese). Beijing: China Friendship Publishing Company. ISBN 9787505741799.
- Prosper Mérimée (2013). Carmen 卡门 (in Chinese). Beijing: China Friendship Publishing Company. ISBN 9787505729964.
