= Ji Pengfei =

Chinese politician (1910–2000)

- 姬鹏飞
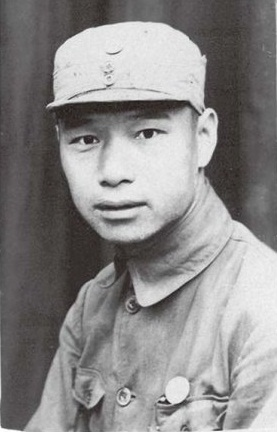
- Ji in 1940

Director of the Hong Kong and Macau Affairs Office
- In office 1983–1990
- Premier: Zhao Ziyang; Li Peng
- Preceded by: Liao Chengzhi
- Succeeded by: Lu Ping

Head of the International Department of the Chinese Communist Party
- In office February 1980 – May 1982
- Preceded by: Zhou Rongxin
- Succeeded by: Jin Ming

Vice Premier of China
- In office 13 September 1982 – 4 May 1982
- Premier: Zhao Ziyang

4th Secretary-General of the State Council
- In office 1979–1981
- Premier: Hua Guofeng; Zhao Ziyang
- Preceded by: Jin Ming
- Succeeded by: Du Xinyuan

3rd Minister of Foreign Affairs
- In office 6 January 1972 – 18 November 1973
- Premier: Zhou Enlai
- Preceded by: Chen Yi
- Succeeded by: Qiao Guanhua

Chinese Ambassador to East Germany
- In office September 1950 – January 1955
- Preceded by: Liao Chengzhi
- Succeeded by: Lu Ping

Personal details
- Born: 2 February 1910 Linyi County, Shanxi, Qing Empire
- Died: 10 February 2000 (aged 90) Beijing, People's Republic of China
- Party: Chinese Communist Party
- Spouse: Xu Hanbing (1919-2015)
- Children: Ji Shengde

Ji Pengfei (simplified Chinese: 姬鹏飞; traditional Chinese: 姬鵬飛; pinyin: Jī Péngfēi, 2 February 1910 – 10 February 2000) was a Chinese politician.

== Biography ==
Ji Pengfei was born in Linyi, Yuncheng, Shanxi in 1910. He joined the Chinese Red Army in 1931, and the Chinese Communist Party in 1933.

After the establishment of the People's Republic of China, Ji Pengfei worked with the Ministry of Foreign Affairs, and led diplomatic missions to East Germany before being appointed as China's first ambassador to the GDR in 1953, being the youngest Chinese ambassador at 43. He was recalled to serve as vice-minister of Foreign Affairs in 1955.

When the Cultural Revolution broke out, he was initially targeted as member of the counter-revolutionary clique ruling the Foreign Ministry, along with Chen Yi and Qiao Guanhua. Nevertheless, he was relatively untouched as he remained at his post. After Chen Yi died in 1972, Ji Pengfei succeeded him as Foreign Minister until 1974, and was elected CCP Central Committee member. He was appointed secretary-general of the Standing Committee of the National People's Congress in 1975, and confirmed in 1978. In 1972, he signed Japan-China Joint Communiqué with Prime Minister Kakuei Tanaka and Foreign Minister Masayoshi Ohira of Japan.

In the post-Cultural Revolution period, Ji Pengfei held several posts. In 1979 he was appointed head of the International Liaison Department of the CCP Central Committee, then vice premier and secretary-general of the State Council from 1980 to 1982, and finally head of the Hong Kong and Macau Affairs Office. He also served as Standing Committee member of the Central Advisory Commission, a Party body aimed at helping the retirement of elder officials.

In 1999, his son, Ji Shengde, a senior member of the People's Liberation Army intelligence, was arrested and tried for corruption, selling classified information and diverting public funds, and was sentenced to death penalty. The penalty was commuted to 20 years in prison, when he returned stolen money and denounce other abuses.

Ji Pengfei was praised by the Xinhua News Agency as an outstanding communist fighter, and greatly lauded again in 2010 at a ceremony in the Great Hall of the People to celebrate his 100th birth anniversary.

Political offices
Preceded by Chen Yi	Foreign Minister of the People's Republic of China; 1972–1974	Succeeded by Qiao Guanhua
Preceded by Liu Ningyi	Secretary-General of the Standing Committee of the National People's Congress; 1975–1979	Succeeded by Peng Zhen
Preceded by Jin Ming	Secretary General of the State Council; 1979–1981	Succeeded by Liang Lingguang
Preceded by Liao Chengzhi	Head of the Hong Kong and Macau Affairs Office; 1983–1990	Succeeded by Lu Ping
Party political offices
Preceded by Geng Biao	Head of the International Department of the Chinese Communist Party; 1979–1982	Succeeded by Qiao Shi
Diplomatic posts
New title	Ambassador of the People's Republic of China to the German Democratic Republic; 1953–1955	Succeeded by Zeng Yongquan
