= Xu Chongde =

Chinese legal professor (1929–2014)

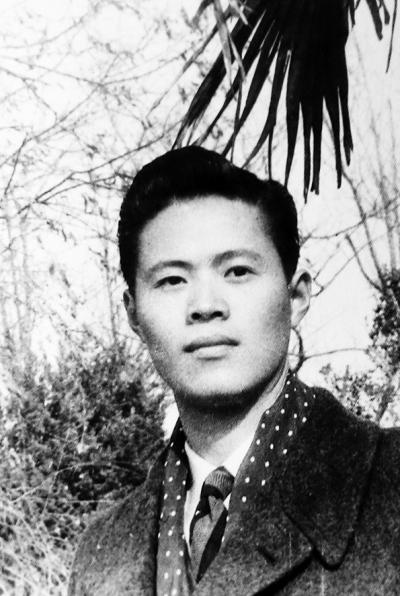
- Xu Chongde before 1949
- Born: January 15, 1929; Qingpu, Shanghai, Republic of China
- Died: March 3, 2014 (aged 85); Beijing, People's Republic of China
- Education: Fudan University
- Occupation: Professor
- Political party: Chinese Communist Party

Xu Chongde (15 January 1929 – 3 March 2014) was a legal expert and professor, political scientist and member of the Chinese Communist Party.

== Biography ==
Xu was born on 15 January 1929 in Qingpu, Shanghai. He studied law at the Fudan University and graduated in 1951. He continued his academic career by teaching at the Renmin University of China after finished his graduate study there. Between 1971 and 1978, Xu taught the history of the Chinese Communist Party at the Beijing Normal University. He later returned to the Renmin University and headed the constitutional teaching and research and the graduate study. He became professor and the mentor of the doctoral study in 1986. He retired in February 2000 and became the honorary professor at the Renmin University.

Xu also participated in the drafting of the 1954 Constitution of China and also the amendments of the Constitution. He was the member of the Constitution Amendments Committee from 1980 to 1982. Xu was appointed by the National People's Congress Standing Committee to the Hong Kong Basic Law Drafting Committee in 1985 and the Macau Basic Law Drafting Committee in 1988, responsible for the draftings of the Hong Kong Basic Law and Macau Basic Law. Xu was also appointed member of the Preparatory Committee for the Hong Kong SAR in 1995 and the Preparatory Committee for the Macau SAR in 1998, witnessing the establishment of the two SARs.

In June 1998 he gave a lecture on legal study to the National People's Congress Standing Committee. In December 2002, he gave the first lecture on constitution to the Politburo of the Chinese Communist Party.

He died at 11:59 p.m. on 3 March 2014 in Beijing, aged 85.
