= Ann Tse-kai =

Hong Kong industrialist, legislator and sinologist

The Honourable Ann Tse-kai OBE GBM JP

Vice Chairman of the Chinese People's Political Consultative Conference
- In office 27 March 1993 – 3 June 2000
- Chairman: Li Ruihuan

Personal details
- Born: 26 June 1912 Shanghai, Republic of China
- Died: 3 June 2000 (aged 87) Hong Kong
- Spouse(s): Chen Wai Wing; Yih Jen Chuen

Chinese name
- Chinese: 安子介
Transcriptions
Standard Mandarin
- Hanyu Pinyin: Ān Zǐjiè
- Wade–Giles: An Tzu-chieh
Yue: Cantonese
- Yale Romanization: Ōn Jí gaai
- Jyutping: On1 Zi2 gaai3

Ann Tse-kai OBE GBM JP (Chinese: 安子介; 26 June 1912 – 3 June 2000), also known as T.K. Ann, was a Hong Kong industrialist, legislator and sinologist. He was the author of Cracking the Chinese Puzzles, a textbook on Chinese characters.

Ann lived in Hong Kong and was a prominent member of the Hong Kong General Chamber of Commerce. He represented the Winsor Industrial Group and, from 1970 to 1978, represented the Chamber of Commerce in the Hong Kong Legislative Council (LegCo).

In 1973, Ann chaired a LegCo commission of enquiry into a teachers' strike.

== Cracking the Chinese Puzzles ==
Cracking the Chinese Puzzles is a textbook for learning Chinese characters. It was originally published as a five volume set, but was later (1987) printed as an abridged version in one volume.

Business positions
Preceded by Chung Sze-yuen	Chairman of Federation of Hong Kong Industries; 1975–1980	Succeeded by James Wu
Political offices
Preceded by Sir Yuet-keung Kan	Chairman of the Hong Kong Trade Development Council; 1975–1979	Succeeded by Sir Yuet-keung Kan
