= Lu Ping =

Chinese diplomat

- 魯平

Head of the Hong Kong and Macau Affairs Office
- In office November 1990 – July 1997
- Premier: Li Peng
- Preceded by: Ji Pengfei
- Succeeded by: Liao Hui

Personal details
- Born: 27 September 1927 Shanghai, China
- Died: 3 May 2015 (aged 87) Beijing Hospital, Beijing, China
- Party: Chinese Communist Party
- Spouse: Xi Liang (m. 1949)

Lu Ping (Chinese: 魯平; 27 September 1927 – 3 May 2015) was a Chinese politician and diplomat. He served as head of the Hong Kong and Macau Affairs Office of the State Council of the People's Republic of China. He is best known as China's delegation head and main representative during negotiations for the transfer of sovereignties of Hong Kong and Macau from Britain and Portugal to the PRC and labelled the last governor of Hong Kong Chris Patten as "Sinner of a Thousand Years" (Chinese: 千古罪人) for the 1994 Hong Kong electoral reform.

Born in Shanghai, Lu graduated from St. John's University, Shanghai in 1947 and joined the Hong Kong and Macau Affairs Office in 1978.
