= Liao Hui (politician) =

Chinese military personnel and politician

- 廖暉

Director of the Hong Kong and Macau Affairs Office
- In office July 1997 – September 2010
- Premier: Zhu Rongji 1997–2003; Wen Jiabao 2003–2010
- Preceded by: Lu Ping
- Succeeded by: Wang Guangya

Personal details
- Born: May 1942 (age 83) Japanese Hong Kong
- Party: Chinese Communist Party

Liao Hui (simplified Chinese: 廖晖; traditional Chinese: 廖暉; pinyin: Liào Huī; Jyutping: Liu6 Fai1; born May 1942 in Hong Kong) is the former director of the Hong Kong and Macau Affairs Office of the State Council of the People's Republic of China. Since March 2003, he has also served as the second vice chairman of the Chinese People's Political Consultative Conference (CPPCC), in charge of the affairs of the Chinese Communist Party in Hong Kong and Macau.

== Biography ==
Liao's ancestors were from Huiyang, Guangdong. Born in Hong Kong, he is the son of Liao Chengzhi, and the grandson of Liao Zhongkai and He Xiangning.

Liao was born in Hong Kong during his father's time with the Eighth Route Army office in colony, but fled to back to China with family following the Japanese invasion in December 1941.

He was a member of every Central Committee of the Chinese Communist Party from the 12th to the 17th, and the vice chairman of the 10th and 11th sessions of the CPPCC.
