= Hong Kong and Macao Affairs Office =

Administrative agency of the Chinese Communist Party

- 国务院港澳事务办公室 中共中央港澳工作办公室
- National Emblem of China

Agency overview
- Formed: 1978 (HKMAO); 2023 (HMO)
- Type: Ministerial level agency
- Jurisdiction: People's Republic of China
- Headquarters: No. 109 Qianmen West Street, Xicheng District, 100031 Beijing
- Agency executives: Xia Baolong, Director; Zhou Ji, Executive Deputy Director; Zheng Yanxiong, Zheng Xincong, Deputy Directors
- Parent agency: Central Leading Group on Hong Kong and Macau Affairs
- Website: www.hmo.gov.cn

Hong Kong and Macau Work Office of the Chinese Communist Party
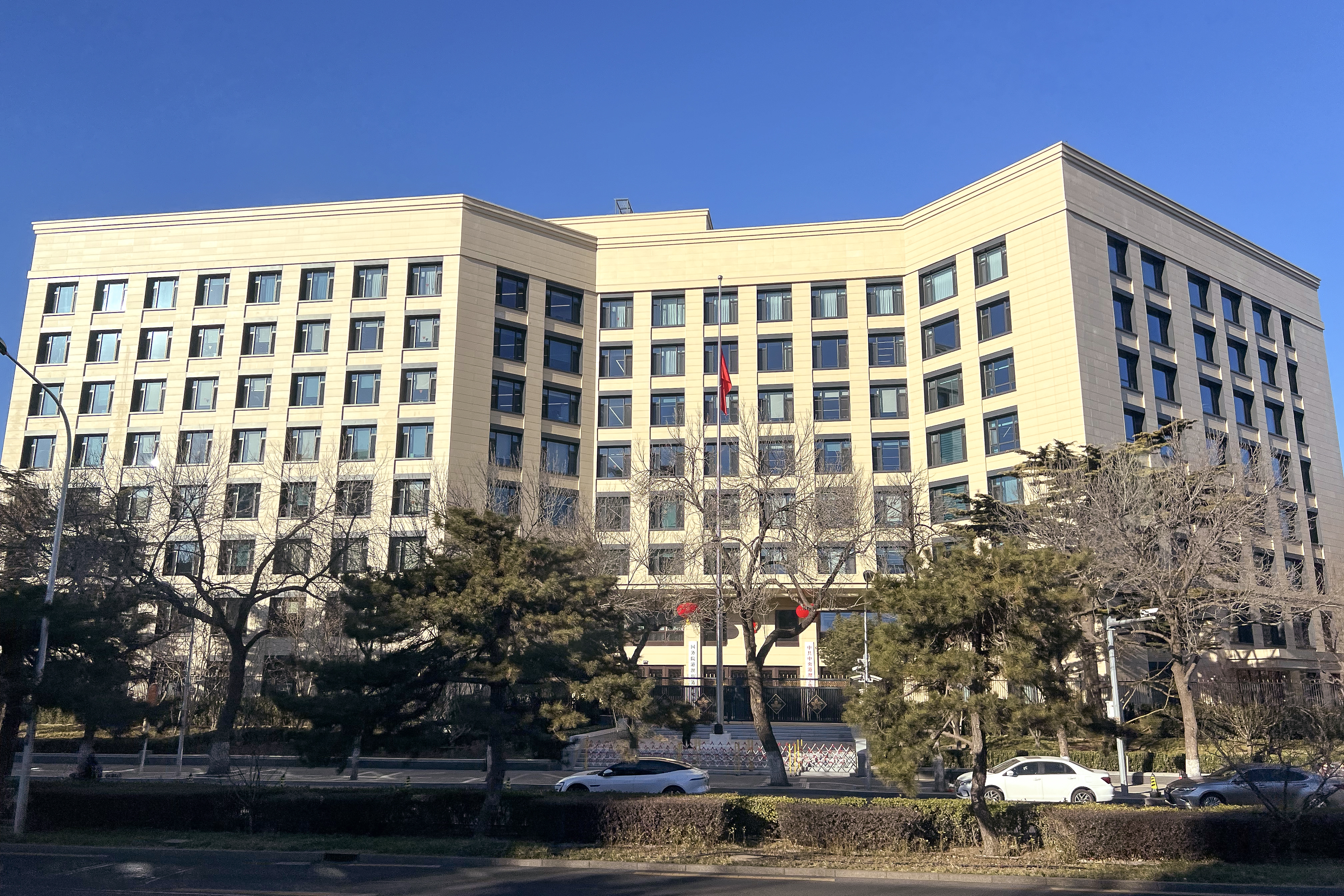
- Simplified Chinese: 中央港澳工作办公室
- Traditional Chinese: 中央港澳工作辦公室
Transcriptions
Standard Mandarin
- Hanyu Pinyin: Zhōngyāng Gǎng'ào Gōngzuò Bàngōngshì
Yue: Cantonese
- Jyutping: zung1 joeng1 gong2 ou3 gung1 zok3 baan6 gung1 sat1

Office of the Central Leading Group on Hong Kong and Macau Affairs
- Simplified Chinese: 中央港澳工作领导小组办公室
- Traditional Chinese: 中央港澳工作領導小組辦公室
Transcriptions
Standard Mandarin
- Hanyu Pinyin: Zhōngyāng Gǎng'ào Gōngzuò Lǐngdǎo Xiǎozǔ Bàngōngshì
Yue: Cantonese
- Jyutping: zung1 joeng1 gong2 ou3 gung1 zok3 ling5 dou6 siu2 zou2 baan6 gung1 sat1

Commonly abbreviated as
- Simplified Chinese: 中央港澳办
- Traditional Chinese: 中央港澳辦
- Literal meaning: Hong Kong & Macau Office
Transcriptions
Standard Mandarin
- Hanyu Pinyin: Zhōngyāng Gǎng'àobàn
Yue: Cantonese
- Jyutping: zung1 joeng1 gong2 ou3 baan6

The Hong Kong and Macao Affairs Office (HKMAO) is a ministerial-level office within the State Council of China. It is responsible for promoting cooperation and coordination of political, economic, and cultural ties between mainland China and the Chinese Special Administrative Regions of Hong Kong and Macau. It was established in 1978. It is located in Xicheng, Beijing.

Under the "one institution with two names" arrangement, it is also the Chinese Communist Party (CCP) Central Committee's Hong Kong and Macao Work Office under the Central Leading Group for Hong Kong and Macau Affairs. It was formed in 2023 on the basis of then State Council's Hong Kong and Macao Affairs Office.

== History ==
The Hong Kong and Macao Affairs Office of the State Council (HKMAO) was established in 1978 to handle Hong Kong's future, which was a British colony at the time. The office, along with the Foreign Ministry, was heavily involved in the negotiations between China and the United Kingdom that eventually led to the 1997 handover of Hong Kong to China.

From June 2017, discipline inspection within the office has been handled by Pan Shengzhou.

The office's Deputy Director, from December 2018 to 2022, was Deng Zhonghua, a lawyer, born 1961. Deng replaced Feng Wei, born September 1957, and is seen by the Hong Kong democratic camp as someone they could talk with. His retirement was delayed by a year so that he could handle Beijing's concerns about 'independence' advocates in Hong Kong. In March 2022, Wang Linggui replaced Deng Zhonghua as a deputy director, leaving a total of 5 deputy directors after the expected departure of Song Zhe.

Notably, in 2020, the appointment of Xia Baolong over Zhang Xiaoming was seen as a stunning reshuffle within the HKMAO. Pao noted that Zhang Xiaoming, the original director of HKMAO, was demoted and re-appointed as the deputy director responsible for the daily operations with his ministerial rank intact.

=== 2023 reforms ===
The office was widely reformed under Chinese Communist Party (CCP) general secretary Xi Jinping as part of the plan on reforming Party and state institutions in March 2023. The reforms established the new "Hong Kong and Macau Work Office of the Central Committee of the CCP", and turned the HKMAO into an external name of the new CCP office under the arrangement "one institution with two names", similar to the Taiwan Affairs Office, which is the external name of the Taiwan Work Office of the CCP Central Committee. The new Hong Kong and Macau Work Office is also expected to serve as the de facto secretariat of the already existing Central Leading Group on Hong Kong and Macau Affairs of the CCP.

== Administration ==
The agency is headed by a Director. There are deputy directors who assist the director in running the office.

The agency answers to the State Council of the People's Republic of China, as well as the Central Leading Group on Hong Kong and Macau Affairs of the CCP.

=== Primary functions ===
According to its website, the agency's main functions are:

- To conduct research on various aspects of Hong Kong and Macao;
- To plan and coordinate the official contacts between different mainland departments and localities – and also with the HKSAR and MCSAR;
- To maintain contact with the Chief Executive and government of the HKSAR – and of the MCSAR;
- To promote and coordinate cooperation and exchanges in fields such as economics, science, technology, education, and culture between the mainland and the two SARs of Hong Kong and Macao;
- To examine applications, approve and issue travel documents for public servants heading to HK and Macao;
- To participate in the management of service export to and from mainland companies in HK and Macao;
- To promote the Basic Laws of HKSAR and MCSAR, as well as the principles and policies of the central government concerning HK and Macao.

Ho Lok-sang, writing for China Daily, posited the importance of understanding the differences in the roles of the Hong Kong and Macao Affairs Office of the State Council and those of the Liaison Office of the Central People's Government in the Hong Kong Special Administrative Region (HKSAR). Both organisations' natures dictate the developments in Hong Kong and the smooth functioning of "one country, two systems" (OCTS) policy.

According to Ho, HKMAO does not possess the authority or executive power with which they can intervene in Hong Kong affairs. On the contrary, the executive branch of the central government of the PRC is made up of 26 constituent departments of the State Council, comprising 21 ministries, such as the Ministry of Education and the Ministry of Public Security; three commissions, such as the Commission on Development and Reform and the Commission on Health; the central bank, the People's Bank of China; and the National Audit Office. Overall, these units can formulate and implement policies. Hence, HKMAO has the right to express concerns, but does not constitute an intervention in the internal affairs of Hong Kong and Macau.

=== List of directors ===
Name	Time Period
Liao Chengzhi	1978–1983
Ji Pengfei	1983–1990
Lu Ping	1990–1997
Liao Hui	1997–2010
Wang Guangya	2010–2017
Zhang Xiaoming	2017–2020
Xia Baolong	2020–present

Current director Xia Baolong also was the vice chairman of the Chinese People's Political Consultative Conference between 2018 and 2023, becoming the highest-ranking official to hold the office in a decade. Zhang Xiaoming was replaced by Xia and became deputy director of the office. This is the first time a state leader, Xia Baolong, was put in charge of the cabinet-level office that oversees the affairs of Hong Kong and Macau.

This move has not only strengthened the central government's direct supervision over the implementation of its policies in Hong Kong and Macau, and reduced incumbent chief Zhang Xiaoming's authority in an unexpected demotion, but is also a countermeasure to ensure civil obedience after months of social turmoil and anti-government protests in Hong Kong. Pao also posited that the leadership change was a significant move that aimed to upgrade the status of the HKMAO – now led by a director at deputy national level and three deputy directors at ministerial level. Cheng Yan — a columnist who wrote a commentary published on Orangenews.hk — also argued that these changes were parts of a proactive reform of the "one country, two systems" principle, and urged Hong Kong society to take initiative to act in concert with China's development and safeguard the "one country, two systems" principle in the city.

== Department structure ==
- Department of Secretary and Administration
- Department of General Affairs
- Department of Policy and Research
- Department of Liaison
- Department of Exchange and Cooperation
- Department of Law
- Institutional Party Committee (Department of Personnel)

=== Internal bureaucracy ===
In 1990, the internal bureaucracy of the Hong Kong and Macau Affairs Office of the State Council adhered to the following hierarchical structure:

Position	Role
Director	Formal head of the office, maintains overall responsibility for policy. Communicates with the Chief Executive.
Deputy Director	Assists the director in managing the daily operations of the office.
First Bureau	Responsible for the conducting of top-down investigations and research authorized by the deputy director and Director.
Second Bureau	Responsible for research on matters of political, legal, cultural, educational, scientific, and technological nature, as requested.
Third Bureau	Responsible for conducting research upon economic concerns, and the management of policy involving Macau.
Administration and Secretary-General's Bureau	Responsible for administrative and organizational work, alongside and assisting the Secretary-General.
Hong Kong and Macau Research Institute	Responsible for conducting research on the economics, culture, and respective societies of Hong Kong and Macau in coordination with the other departments.

By 2019, the internal bureaucracy of the Hong Kong and Macau Affairs Office was expanded upon to include the departments of National Security Affairs and Propaganda.

== Statements ==
On 20 December 2021, G7, European Union (EU), and Five Eyes members issued public remarks to criticize the Legislative Council election. They described the electoral system as 'Beijing's strategy to ensure only "patriots" hold office' and criticized the low turnout rate. Foreign ministers of the G7 and the High Representative of the European Union for Foreign Affairs Josep Borrell also issued a joint statement which said that ' democratic elements are eroded' in Hong Kong. On the same day, the HKMAO issued a statement in rebuttal. A spokesman for the office said that western countries 'disguised their interference in local affairs and purpose of destroying Hong Kong's prosperity' by claiming care and concerns over Hong Kong's democratic development. The spokesman also said in the same statement that western countries have always offered a political platform for the anti-China gangs, incited them, and provided capital support to them to organize illegal movements.

On 9 May 2022, G7 issued a press statement which expressed "grave concern over the selection process" of Hong Kong's new leader and described it as "part of an ongoing assault on political pluralism and fundamental freedoms". The European Union (EU) has also expressed regrets on 'the violation of democratic principles and political pluralism' in the chief executive(CE) election on 8 May, with EU's top diplomat Josep Borell claiming it as 'another step in the dismantling of the one country, two systems principle'.

In response to these remarks, the HKMAO, on the same day, issued a statement defending the CE election. The spokesman for the office criticized the G7 and EU for 'blatantly smearing Hong Kong's election and meddling in Hong Kong issues and China's domestic affairs', 'ignoring the facts that Hong Kong's CE election was held in accordance with the laws and principles of fairness and impartiality, election results have commanded people's respect and support and the atmosphere in Hong Kong society was united and delightful'.

On 19 November 2021, the United States passed the Hong Kong Human Rights and Democracy Act, a federal law that provides for sanctions relating to undermining fundamental freedoms and autonomy in Hong Kong, and requires annual reports on Hong Kong autonomy to be made. On 20 November 2021, Yang Guang from the office made the remark that the US has 'ignored China's multiple objection, blatantly interfered in China's internal affairs, contravened internal laws and principles of international relations, and displayed dominance in the ugliest sense.'

On 20 January 2022, European Parliament passed a resolution condemning the deterioration of human rights in Hong Kong, including severe restrictions on freedom of expression, freedom of association, and press freedom. European lawmakers also urged the European Commission and EU member states to impose sanctions on the city's top officials and proposed a review of Hong Kong's status at the World Trade Organization (WTO). On 21 January 2022, the HKMAO issued a statement describing the resolution as 'a rubbish paper', a "smear on its democracy and freedom". A spokesman for the office said that European countries were 'trying to interfere in China's internal affairs by pointing fingers at and derogating Hong Kong affairs'. The spokesman also remarked that China has 'moved away from the era of national humiliation' and 'will not allow any blatant interference of local affairs.'

=== Controversy ===
In April 2020, the HKMAO expressed approval of the Court of Appeal judgment upholding the constitutionality of the Emergency Regulations Ordinance and disapproval of certain current affairs in the Legislative Council. In another strongly-worded statement released by the Liaison Office, the HKMAO was recognised as one of 'China's top bodies overseeing the city's affairs' that 'is authorized by the central authorities to handle Hong Kong affairs'. The statement added that the HKMAO is entitled to supervise affairs in Hong Kong and make statements on issues on Hong Kong's relationship with Beijing, ranging from the "correct" implementation of the Basic Law to matters pertaining to the overall interests of society.

Controversies as to whether the remarks made by the HKMAO constitute a violation of article 22 of the Basic Law had been stirred up. Article 22(1) of the Basic Law provides that: "No department of the Central People's Government and no province, autonomous region, or municipality directly under the Central Government may interfere in the affairs which the Hong Kong Special Administrative Region administers on its own in accordance with this Law." The Hong Kong Bar Association issued a statement describing the public comments issued by the HKMAO as an exercise of public authority, which had already contravened article 22(1).

In response to such controversies, a spokesman for the HKMAO said it is "inaccurate" to say the liaison office is bound by article 22 of the Basic Law. The local government had also issued a statement responding to media enquiries. In the statement, the government referred to article 22(2) of the Basic Law to explain the legal basis of HKMAO. It added that the office was entrusted with authority and responsibility to represent the Central government to express views and exercise supervisory power on major issues including those concerning the relations between the Central Government and the accurate implementation of the Basic Law. Therefore, the public remarks made by the HKMAO were legitimate and in accordance with the Basic Law.

In another public comment released by Professor Ho Lok Sang, Head of the Department of Economics and Director of the Centre for Public Policy Studies at Lingnan University, the general public shall not 'misunderstand the roles of the HKMAO'. He noted that the difference between intervening in Hong Kong's internal affairs and expressing concern over some troubling developments shall be drawn, and whether an act committed by the HKMAO constitutes an intervention of the Basic Law shall be assessed "when there is a substantive impact on the actual operation of the political system."

The HKMAO issued a statement against pro-democracy figures who organized primaries for the Hong Kong Legislative Council in 2020, saying that it was "an unlawful manipulation of Hong Kong elections" and a "blatant challenge" to the Basic Law, despite the Basic Law's Article 68 stating that the ultimate goal is to have universal suffrage for all members of the Legislative Council.

In September 2022, deputy director Huang Liuquan, claimed that it was "inappropriate" to call 113,000 people leaving Hong Kong in the last year as an emigration wave, and also said claims that the National Security Law had "mainlandised" the city were inaccurate. The decrease in population was 1.6% from a year earlier, the largest drop since record-keeping started in 1961. Huang said, "Hong Kong's population drop is caused by various factors and there is no way to suggest that it is a result of an emigration wave."

== See also ==
- Hong Kong Affairs Advisor
- Hong Kong Liaison Office
- Macau Liaison Office
