= Hong Kong Affairs Advisor =

Hong Kong Affairs Advisers (Chinese: 港事顧問) were appointed by the Chinese government after the last Governor of Hong Kong, Chris Patten carried out his electoral reform in the British Hong Kong, in the eve of the handover of the sovereignty of the city-state from the British Empire to the People's Republic of China in 1997.

== Notable members ==
- David Akers-Jones
- Chung Sze-yuen
- Charles K. Kao
- Run Run Shaw
- Tung Chee-hwa
- Woo Chia-wei

== See also ==
- Hong Kong and Macao Affairs Office
