= Alexander Wai =

Ir Prof Alexander Wai
- 衞炳江

6th President and Vice-Chancellor of the Hong Kong Baptist University
- Assuming office 1 February 2021
- Chancellor: Carrie Lam; John Lee Ka-chiu
- Succeeding: Roland Chin

Deputy President and Provost of the Hong Kong Polytechnic University
- In office 1 March 2020 – 30 November 2020
- President: Teng Jin-guang
- Chancellor: Carrie Lam
- Preceded by: Philip Chan
- Succeeded by: Wing-tak Wong

Vice President (Research Development) of the Hong Kong Polytechnic University
- In office 1 July 2010 – 29 February 2020
- President: Timothy W. Tong, Teng Jin-guang
- Chancellor: Leung Chun-ying, Carrie Lam

Personal details
- Education: University of Hong Kong (BSc); University of Maryland, College Park (PhD)

Alexander Wai Ping-kong (Chinese: 衞炳江) is a Hong Kong physicist who has been serving as 6th president and vice-chancellor of the Hong Kong Baptist University since 1 February 2021.

Formerly at the Hong Kong Polytechnic University, he served as vice president for research development from 1 July 2010 to 29 February 2020 and as deputy president and provost from 1 March to 30 November 2020.

== Biography ==
Wai received a Bachelor of Science (Honours) degree in physics with first-class honours from the University of Hong Kong in 1981. He received a Master of Science degree in 1985 and a Doctor of Philosophy degree in physics in 1988, both from the University of Maryland, College Park in the United States.

In 1988, Wai joined Science Applications International Corporation in McLean, Virginia, as a research scientist, contributing to the Tethered Satellite System project, a NASA Space Shuttle mission. In 1990, he held a joint appointment as a research associate in the Department of Electrical Engineering at the University of Maryland, Baltimore County, and the Department of Physics at the University of Maryland, College Park.

In 1996, Wai joined the Hong Kong Polytechnic University as an assistant professor at the university's Department of Electronic Engineering. He was appointed Chair Professor of Optical Communications in 2005.

At the Hong Kong Polytechnic University, Wai served as vice president for research development from 1 July 2010 to 29 February 2020, a period of more than 9 years. He briefly served as deputy president and provost of the Hong Kong Polytechnic University from 1 March to 30 November 2020.

Wai started to serve as the 6th president and vice-chancellor of the Hong Kong Baptist University on 1 February 2021.
