= Tony Wu =

Tony Wu may refer to:

- Wu Chung-yi, Taiwanese billionaire
- Tony Wu (actor), Hong Kong actor and retired baseball player
- Wu Tung-lin, Taiwanese tennis player

== See also ==
- Anthony Wu, standing committee member of the Chinese People's Political Consultative Conference
