= Jasper Tsang =

Hong Kong politician and former President of the Legislative Council

The Honourable Jasper Tsang Yok-sing GBM JP
- 曾鈺成
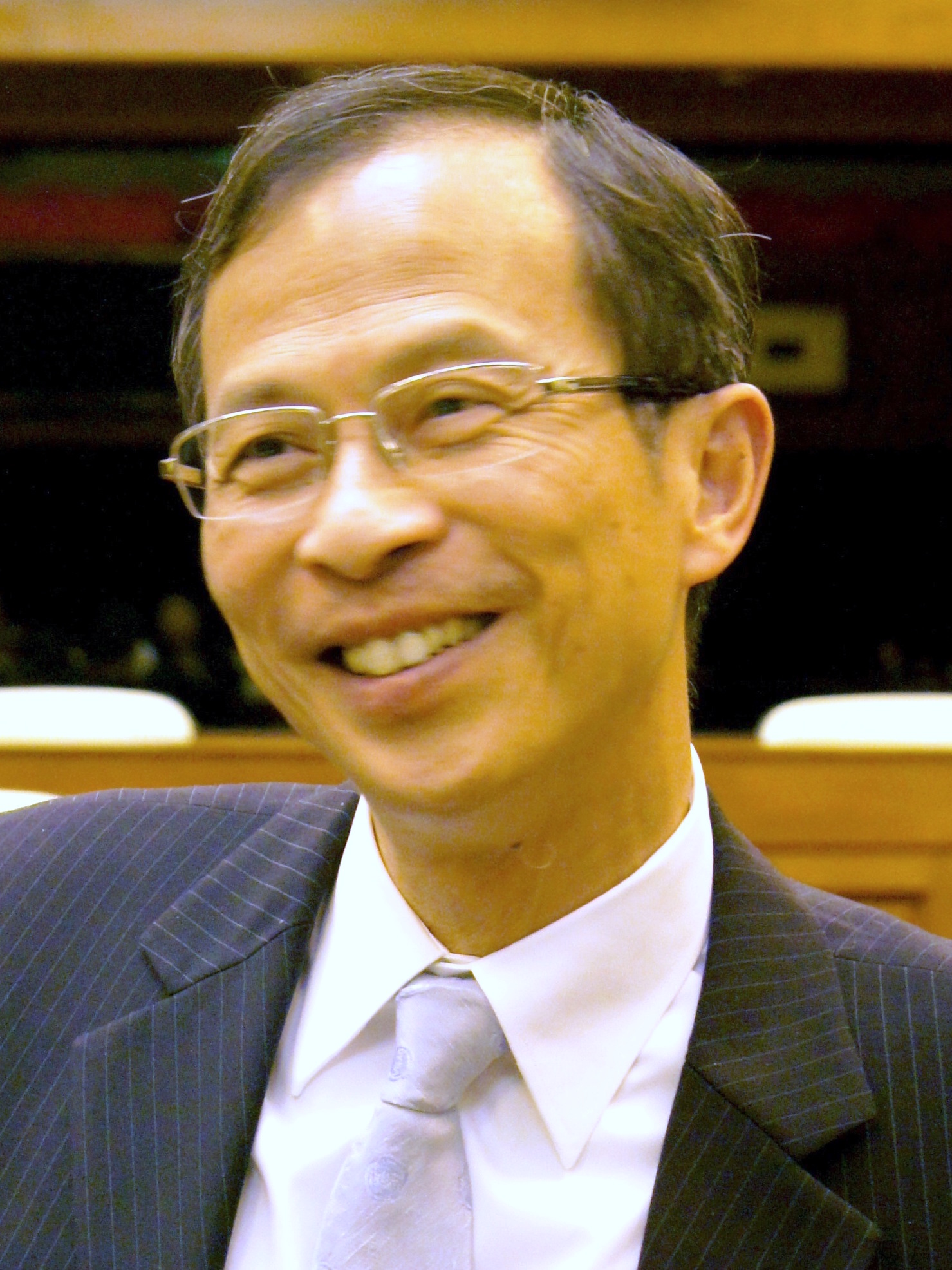

2nd President of the Legislative Council
- In office 8 October 2008 – 30 September 2016
- Deputy: Miriam Lau; Andrew Leung
- Preceded by: Rita Fan
- Succeeded by: Andrew Leung

Member of the Legislative Council
- In office 1 October 2008 – 30 September 2016
- Preceded by: Choy So-yuk
- Succeeded by: Nathan Law
- Constituency: Hong Kong Island
- In office 21 December 1996 – 30 June 1998 (Provisional Legislative Council)
- In office 1 July 1998 – 30 September 2008
- Succeeded by: Starry Lee
- Constituency: Kowloon West

Non-official Member of the Executive Council
- In office 1 July 2002 – 15 October 2008
- Appointed by: Tung Chee-hwa; Donald Tsang
- Preceded by: Tam Yiu-chung
- Succeeded by: Lau Kong-wah

Chairman of the Democratic Alliance for the Betterment of Hong Kong
- In office 10 July 1992 – 2 December 2003
- Preceded by: New party
- Succeeded by: Ma Lik

Personal details
- Born: 17 May 1947 (age 79) Guangzhou, Guangdong, China
- Party: Democratic Alliance for the Betterment and Progress of Hong Kong
- Spouse(s): Young Sun-yee (divorced in 2007) Ng Kar-man (m. 2009)
- Education: St Paul's College; University of Hong Kong (BA, CertEd, MEd)
- Occupation: Politician

Jasper Tsang
- Traditional Chinese: 曾鈺成
- Simplified Chinese: 曾钰成
Transcriptions
Standard Mandarin
- Hanyu Pinyin: Zēng Yùchéng
Yue: Cantonese
- Yale Romanization: Jāng Yuhk-sìhng
- Jyutping: Zang^{1} Juk^{6}-sing^{4}

Jasper Tsang Yok-sing GBM JP (Chinese: 曾鈺成; born 17 May 1947) is a Hong Kong politician. He is the founding member of the largest pro-Beijing party the Democratic Alliance for the Betterment and Progress of Hong Kong (DAB) from 1992 to 2003 and the 2nd President of the Legislative Council from 2008 to 2016.

Tsang chose to teach in the leftist Pui Kiu Middle School and became its principal before he stepped into politics in the 1980s. In 1992 he founded the Democratic Alliance for the Betterment of Hong Kong and first contested in the 1995 Legislative Council election in which he lost the race. He was elected in Kowloon West in the first Legislative Council election after the handover of Hong Kong in 1998. He was also the member of the Executive Council from 2002 to 2008. He became the President of the Legislative Council in 2008. Due to his relatively fair and accommodating presiding styles and his relatively liberal image within the pro-Beijing camp, he enjoyed high popularity within his last years before his retirement from the Legislative Council in 2016. He also expressed interest in running in the 2012 and 2017 Chief Executive elections but did not stand eventually.

== Early life, family and education ==
Tsang was born in Guangzhou, Guangdong, China on 17 May 1947. Tsang's father, Tsang Chiu-kan was a clerk at the Chinese General Chamber of Commerce, a pro-Beijing business organisation in the colony. He moved to Hong Kong when he was two years old and grew up in Sai Wan's Academic Terrace. His younger brother, Tsang Tak-sing, would become a pro-establishment politician who served as the Secretary for Home Affairs from 2007 to 2015.

Jasper Tsang received his primary and secondary education at St. Paul's College run by the Hong Kong Anglican Church. He studied mathematics at the University of Hong Kong, graduating with first class honours.

=== Political awareness ===
Tsang grew his patriotic sentiments and interest in Marxism by reading the leftist newspaper Wen Wei Po which his father brought home from work every day. He idolized Qian Xuesen, a renowned scientist who returned to the mainland from the US in the 1950s. In 1966, he went back to Guangzhou with his mother and was impressed by the socialist life there. He proclaimed himself a Marxist and studied works of Karl Marx and Mao Zedong with like-minded classmates at a time when the majority of the students at the University of Hong Kong supported the colonial rule and had negative views on the Chinese Communist Party (CCP).

He joined several university students in making donations to the leftist unions through Wen Wei Po following the industrial dispute at the Hong Kong Artificial Flower Works in April 1967 which later escalated to large-scale riots. He joined the demonstrations in Central and founded a student journal called New HKU to launch a counter-propaganda against The Undergrad, the official publication of the Hong Kong University Students' Union which was critical of the riots. His brother, Tsang Tak-sing, was arrested, tried and convicted for distributing anti-government leaflets at school, and was imprisoned for 18 months. In the wake of his brother's event, Tsang gave up the plans to further his studies abroad although he had been accepted by four prominent universities in the United States.

=== Teaching career and additional education ===
After graduating from the University of Hong Kong, Tsang joined the leftist Piu Kiu Middle School as a teacher under the patronage of principal Ng Hong-mun, at the time the pro-CCP leftists were marginalised by the colonial government. After the downfall of Gang of Four in 1976, Tsang began to question his own socialist beliefs. He obtained a Graduate Diploma of Education in 1981 and a Master of Education at the University of Hong Kong in 1983. He went on to become the principal of the Piu Kiu Middle School in 1986 until he left his position to become a full-time politician. He became the supervisor of the school and was also the supervisor of a newly established direct-subsidised school, the Pui Kiu College.

== Political career ==
=== Stepping into politics ===
Despite the events of Gang of Four and the political instability, Tsang remained faithful to the Chinese Communist Party. Due to his good education background, Tsang became an important member of the leftist camp. He stepped into the politics in 1976 when he was appointed a member of the Guangdong provincial committee of the Chinese People's Political Consultative Conference (CPPCC). He later became a member of the CPPCC National Committee in 1993.

In the mid-1980s, Tsang was actively involved in the discussion of the drafting of the Basic Law of Hong Kong, the mini-constitution after the transfer of sovereignty over Hong Kong in 1997. He was one of the members of the "Group of 38" proposal consisting of educators with leftist background led by Basic Law Consultative Committee member Cheng Kai-nam which put forward a middle-of-the-ground proposal between the uncompromising rift of the pro-business conservative "Group of 89" and the pro-democracy liberal "Group of 190" proposals.

During the 1989 Tiananmen Square protests and massacre, Tsang called for the support of the teachers and students of the Pui Kiu Middle School to support the Tiananmen students and their cause for a democratic China. After the massacre on 4 June, he told the reporters that he was "shocked and sad". However he and other leftists soon reiterated their position on the event and were recalled under Beijing's command.

=== DAB Chairman ===
After the defeat of the traditional leftist candidates in the first direct election of the Legislative Council by the pro-democracy candidates of the United Democrats of Hong Kong in the wake of the pro-democracy sentiment after the Tiananmen Square protests and massacre, Tsang and other leftists founded the Democratic Alliance for the Betterment of Hong Kong in 1991 under the call of director of the Hong Kong and Macau Affairs Office Lu Ping to gear up the "patriotic force" in the territory. Tsang became the first chairman of the party. He was subsequently appointed to the Preparatory Committee for the establishment of the Hong Kong Special Administrative Region.

In the 1995 Legislative Council election, he ran in Kowloon Central but was defeated by the less known candidate Liu Sing-lee from the pro-democracy Association for Democracy and People's Livelihood (ADPL). He received around 16,000 votes, 43 per cent of the total vote share. He was subsequently elected to the Provisional Legislative Council in 1996 by the Beijing-controlled Selection Committee. Tsang was first directly elected to the Legislative Council in the first post-handover election in 1998, representing the Kowloon West constituency. In 2002 he was appointed to the Executive Council by Chief Executive Tung Chee-hwa. In 2002 the fifth anniversary of the Special Administrative Region, he was awarded the Gold Bauhinia Star (GBS) by the government.

As the ally of the Tung administration, the DAB suffered criticisms with the unpopular government. During the controversy surrounding the enactment of the national security bill in Hong Kong, Tsang drew criticism for his party's support of the government's legislative initiatives. Following the 1 July 2003 protests and disappointing performance of his party in the 2003 District Council election, he resigned from the party's chairmanship in December 2003.

=== Legislative Council President ===
He gave up his Kowloon West seat and ran in the Hong Kong Island in the 2008 Legislative Council election. After the election, he was elected to the presidency of the Legislative Council, replacing the retired Rita Fan. He is widely assumed to be a member of the Chinese Communist Party, in part because, when asked directly, he has stated only that, "Since the foundation of the DAB, I have been asked whether I am a Communist Party member many times. And I can say frankly, I have never answered this question. The reason is, Hong Kong people's attitude to the concept of the Communist Party is very negative." He resigned from the Executive Council after being elected the President.

Tsang was also criticised for the manner in which he presided over Legislative Council meetings, which led to walkout protests, though he was generally perceived to be fair and accommodating and enjoyed friendly relations with both pro-Beijing and pan-democratic members. He softened his early years' staunch pro-Beijing image during his presidency in the Legislative Council and became increasingly sympathetic with the pro-democracy cause. On the 1989 Tiananmen Square protests, which he referred to as "suppressing students was surely wrong." In the run-up to the 2012 Chief Executive election, he was noted for his relatively liberal views on issues such as universal suffrage, and initially expressed interest in putting himself forward as a candidate, before later backing out.

After the legislative vote of the 2015 Hong Kong electoral reform in which the pro-Beijing legislators undertook a controversial and embarrassing walkout, the Oriental Daily published leaked messages in which Tsang was seen to have discussed voting strategy with a pro-Beijing legislator in a WhatsApp group before the electoral reform package and suggesting the legislators delay their speeches so that the pan-democrats could not control the timing of the vote. The pan-democrats questioned Tsang's neutrality in the chamber, seeing the text messages as "clear evidence" that he was colluding with the rest of the government's allies and planned to mull a no-confidence vote against him. He apologised to the legislators but refused to resign.

In annual polls conducted by the University of Hong Kong Public Opinion Programme, Tsang was voted "Hong Kong’s most popular Legislative Councillor" for each of the last 13 years he was in office, 2004-2016 inclusive. In 2016, his support rating was 63.1 percent, ahead of, in order, Regina Ip with 49.6 percent, Alan Leong with 48.2 percent and Starry Lee with a 45.6 percent. On 1 July 2015, Tsang was awarded the Grand Bauhinia Medal, the SAR's highest honour, in recognition of his public service, particularly his presidency of the Legislative Council.

=== After Legislative Council ===
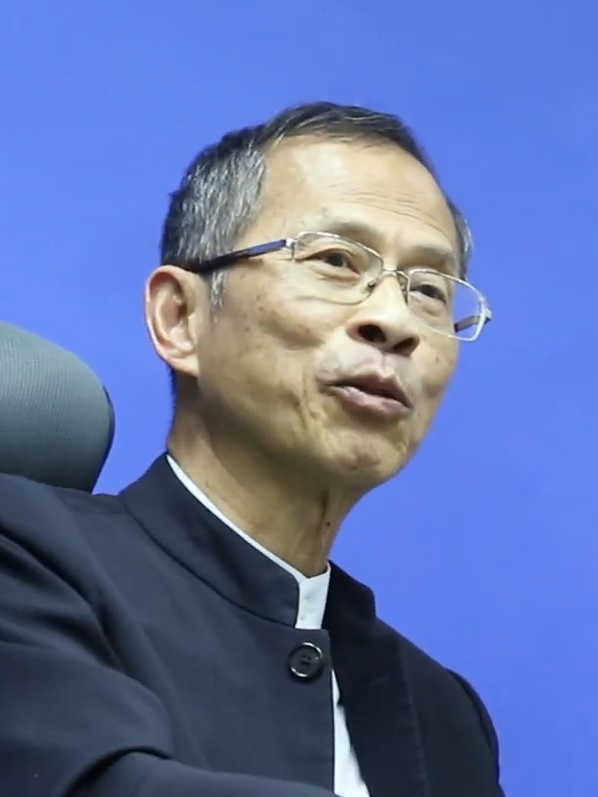
Tsang in 2020

In July 2016, after announcing the end of his Legislative Council career, Tsang announced that he was ready to stand in the 2017 Chief Executive election, just as he had publicly toyed with the idea in the 2012 process. He said he would stand against incumbent Leung Chun-ying, expected to seek a second term, in order "to offer a genuine choice". However, two or three months later he was told privately by the Beijing government not to join the process, he later revealed, and so he publicly distanced himself from any run at the Chief Executive role, describing it as “not a good position to be in” and adding that it required one to serve “two bosses” — Hong Kong society and Beijing.

== Personal life ==
In 2009, Tsang married Ng Kar-man, a dance instructor, in a ceremony officiated by former Secretary for Justice Elsie Leung. He was previously married to Young Sun-yee.

In February 2017, Tsang was revealed to have had a critical heart condition and underwent angioplasty surgery. Speaking shortly afterwards, he said, "I have narrowly escaped death."

== See also ==
- Politics of Hong Kong
- Tsang Tak-sing
- List of graduates of University of Hong Kong

== Notefoot ==
Political offices
Preceded by Tam Yiu-chung	Non-official Member of Executive Council; 2002–2008	Succeeded by Lau Kong-wah
Legislative Council of Hong Kong
Preceded by Rita Fan	President of the Legislative Council of Hong Kong; 2008–2016	Succeeded by Andrew Leung
Party political offices
New political party	Chairman of Democratic Alliance for the Betterment of Hong Kong; 1992–2003	Succeeded by Ma Lik
Order of precedence
Preceded by Jose Yu; Recipients of the Grand Bauhinia Medal	Hong Kong order of precedence Recipients of the Grand Bauhinia Medal	Succeeded by Cheng Yiu-tong; Recipients of the Grand Bauhinia Medal
