= John Leong Chi-yan =

Hong Kong physician

Professor the Honourable John Leong Chi-yan GBM GBS
- 梁智仁

Chairman of the Hospital Authority
- In office 1 December 2013 – 30 November 2019
- Preceded by: Anthony Wu
- Succeeded by: Henry Fan

President of the Open University of Hong Kong
- In office 1 December 2003 – 31 March 2014
- Preceded by: Tam Sheung-wai
- Succeeded by: Wong Yuk-shan

Personal details
- Born: 10 July 1942 (age 83) Japanese-occupied Hong Kong

John Leong Chi-yan GBM GBS (Chinese: 梁智仁, born 10 July 1942), is a Hong Kong physician who served as the chairman of the Hospital Authority and the president of the Open University of Hong Kong.

He was awarded the Gold Bauhinia Star in 2019 and the Grand Bauhinia Medal in 2025.
