= Lawrence Fung Siu Por =

Hong Kong entrepreneur (born 1949)

The Honourable Lawrence Fung Siu Por GBM GBS
- 馮紹波
- Born: 1949 (age 76–77); Hong Kong
- Spouse: Alexandra Lee Suk Wai
- Awards: 大紫荊勳章 金紫荊星章

Chinese name
- Traditional Chinese: 馮紹波
- Simplified Chinese: 冯绍波
Transcriptions

Lawrence Fung Siu Por is a Hong Kong entrepreneur. He is the founder and chairman of Hong Kong Economic Times Holdings Limited.

== History ==
Fung received his secondary school education from King's College. He entered the University of Hong Kong (HKU) in 1969, and was elected as the president of the university's Student Union in 1971. He graduated from HKU with a Bachelor of Social Sciences degree in 1972, and later from the University of Manchester with a Master of Arts degree in Economics in 1977. In 2010, he was awarded the degree of Doctor of Social Sciences honoris causa by HKU.

Fung was conferred the Gold Bauhinia Star by the Government of Hong Kong in 2003 and later the Grand Bauhinia Medal in 2025.

Fung was married to Alexandra Lee Suk Wai.

== Honours ==
- Gold Bauhinia Star
- Grand Bauhinia Medal
