= Chen Hsong =

Hong Kong manufacturing company

- Native name: 震雄集团
- Traded as: SEHK: 57 FWB: CHJ
- Industry: Injection Moulding Machinery Manufacturing
- Founded: 1958; 67 years ago in Hong Kong
- Founder: Dr. Chiang Chen
- Successor: Chiang Lai Yuen
- Website: chenhsong.com

Chen Hsong Holdings Limited (Chinese: 震雄集团) is a manufacturer and supplier of plastic injection moulding equipment and systems. The company was established by Dr. Chiang Chen in a small village workshop in Hong Kong in 1958. The following half-century has been a period of growth and expansion both locally and internationally. Today Chen Hsong has a customer base covering more than 80 countries worldwide including China, Taiwan, the United States, Canada, France, the United Kingdom, Brazil, Argentina, Mexico and most Southeast Asian countries.

== Product and sector placement ==
Chen Hsong is primarily a developer, manufacturer and supplier of injection moulding machines, and manufactures a wide variety of equipment with clamping forces ranging from 20 to 6,500 tons, and injection rates between 28.4g and 106 kg capacity. They can provide mold machining and auto-molding systems as well as bespoke solutions for specific applications.

Chen Hsong's core business is the production and operation of injection moulding machinery, precision moulds, hydraulic proportional valves, and servo valves. They also carry out servicing and related parts supply for these products and offer production support, operation of preforms, and equipment leasing of injection moulding machines.

Chen Hsong is a significant supplier of injection moulding equipment. Bloomberg have identified the company as one of the two 'key players' in the injection molding machine market in the Asia-Pacific region. Chen Hsong supply over 15,000 machines each year, and their Chinese subsidiary is individually ranked as the second most significant injection moulding machine brand in China after Haitian Plastic Machinery Group.

In 2018 the company started cooperative ventures with US distributors with the intention of increasing sales in the US market, but along with many other manufacturing companies with strong Chinese connections progress was impacted by the subsequent imposition of trade tariffs by then President Donald Trump.

== Research and development ==
The company invests significantly in Research and Development, and this includes ensuring compliance with national and international standards. Products supplied in the EU all conform to EU regulation both for safety and also to maximise cross-compatibility of peripherals and accessories.

== Service and support ==
Across Europe Chen Hsong has agents in 23 countries to provide a local sales, service and support network. In North America relationships with distributors have been established along the lines of joint ventures since 2018 to ensure reliable long-term service arrangements. Local support and service networks in China are available 24 hours a day, every day of the year.

== History ==
- 1958 First factory built in Tai Hom Village
- 1959 First two-colour extrusion blow moulding machines
- 1991 Listed on the Hong Kong Stock Exchange (Exchange code: 0057.HK)
- 2000 Main manufacturing and R&D centers established in 560,000 sqm "Chen Hsong Industrial Park" in Shenzhen, PRC
- 2007 Launch of the SUPERMASTER Two-Platen Advanced Energy Saving Injection Moulding Machine.
- 2009 Launched the EASYMASTER Servo Drive Injection Moulding Machine Series and JETMASTER C2 Servo Drive Large Injection Moulding Machine Series
- 2011 Entered into business collaboration with Mitsubishi Heavy Industries Plastic Technology Co., Ltd. (MHI-PT) regarding the manufacturing and OEM manufacturing of Large-Sized Hydraulic Injection Moulding Machines.
- 2012 Development and launch of the largest injection moulding machine made in China, the 4,500 ton Two-Platen Ultra-Large Machine.
- 2014 Launch of the 6,500 ton SUPERMASTER Two Platen Advanced Servo Drive Injection Moulding Machine
- 2015 The 1000 ton SUPERMASTER Large Dual Color Injection Moulding Machine is launched.
- 2018 Chen Hsong 60th birthday, and launched SPARK series SM100-SPARK all-electric injection moulding machine.

== Philanthropy ==
In 1990, Dr. Chiang Chen donated all his shares in Chen Hsong Group to finance philanthropic activities through The Chiang Chen Industrial Charity Foundation, focused on industrial and economic education and training, and to support improvements in manufacturing technology. In addition the company has made donations to specific causes that have affected the families of people living locally to their business operations: 2008 Donates the sum of HK$10 million for the magnitude 8.0 earthquake that severely hits China's Sichuan province. 2020 Donates Anti-COVID-19 Resources to Hospital Authority of Hong Kong.

== Awards and recognition ==
- 1980 Small Injection Moulding Machines (Minijet 20D) is awarded "New Product Award" in the Hong Kong New Products Competition of The Chinese Manufacturers’ Association of Hong Kong.
- 1986 Chen Hsong's injection moulding machine wins "Hong Kong New Product Award" in the Hong Kong New Product Competition of The Chinese Manufacturers’ Association of Hong Kong.
- 1989 A Chen Hsong Closed-Loop Injection Moulding Machine wins the "CMA Design Award" section of The Governor's Award for Industry Machinery / Equipment Design Competition of The Chinese Manufacturers’ Association of Hong Kong
- 2000 The CHEN-PET, two-stage preform moulding turnkey system, is awarded the Hong Kong Awards for Industry CMA Machinery and Equipment Design Award
- 2005 SFIE of Shenzhen, China awards Chen Hsong for being "The Shenzhen Top Brand"
- 2007 Chen Hsong's "CH" brand is awarded China Top Brand status.
- 2010 Chen Hsong Machinery (Shenzhen) Co., Ltd. is awarded the "High Technology Enterprises Certificate" in China.
- 2013 Wins 2013 Hong Kong CMA Industry Award for Machinery and Machine Tools Design
- 2019 Wins the "Grand Award" and "Certificate of Merit" for its SPARK Series All Electric Injection Molding Machine and the SUPERMASTER Two Platen Series 6,500 Tons Clamping Force with Two Injection Unit System respectively in the Equipment and Machinery Design category of the Hong Kong Awards for Industries organised by The Chinese Manufacturers' Association of Hong Kong.

== Financial and corporate information ==
Chen Hsong has approximately 2,300 employees and has been listed on the Hong Kong stock exchange since 1991 (57:HK).

=== Executives and board members ===
The current chairman, CEO and executive director is Chiang Lai Yuen(Chinese: 蔣麗苑), who commenced in post in April 2018, succeeding her father, Chiang Chen. Hau Leung Chung "Stephen" has been Chief Officer:Strategy/Executive Director since April 2003 and Chi Ngai Chan "John" has been Company Secretary since his appointment in December 2016.

Board Members include Chiang Lai Yuen of Chen Hsong Holdings, Lee Tze Hau "Michael," and Chan Charnwut "Bernard" of Asia Financial Holdings Ltd.
