= Gold Bauhinia Star =

Gold Bauhinia Star 金紫荊星章
- Presented by: Government of the Hong Kong Special Administrative Region
- Post-nominals: GBS
- Established: 1998
- First award: 1998

Precedence
- Next (higher): Grand Bauhinia Medal
- Next (lower): Medal for Bravery (Gold)

Gold Bauhinia Star
- Traditional Chinese: 金紫荊星章
- Simplified Chinese: 金紫荆星章
Transcriptions
Standard Mandarin
- Hanyu Pinyin: Jīn Zǐjīng Xīng Zhāng
Yue: Cantonese
- Jyutping: gam1 zi2 ging1 sing1 zoeng1

The Gold Bauhinia Star (Chinese: 金紫荊星章, GBS) is the highest rank in Order of the Bauhinia Star, under the honours system of Hong Kong, created in 1997 to replace the British honours system after the transfer of sovereignty to the People's Republic of China and the establishment of the Hong Kong Special Administrative Region (HKSAR).

It is awarded to individuals who have given distinguished service to the community or rendered public or voluntary services of a very high degree of merit.

== List of recipients ==
The list below entails the recipients of the Gold Bauhinia Star.

=== 1998 ===
- Mr WONG Wing-ping, Joseph, GBS, JP
- Mr WOO Kwong-ching, Peter, GBS, JP
- The Hon. Mrs FAN HSU Lai-tai, Rita, GBS, JP
- Mr John Estmond STRICKLAND, GBS, JP
- Dr HU Hung-lick, Henry, GBS, JP
- ~~Mr HUI Si-yan, Rafael, GBS, JP~~ (revoked in 2018)
- Mr Raymond CHOW, GBS
- The Hon. LAU Wong-fat, GBS, JP
- Dr CHENG Hon-kwan, GBS, JP
- Dr TSE Chi-wai, Daniel, GBS, JP
- Mr KWONG Ki-chi, GBS, JP
- Mr LO Hong-sui, Vincent, GBS
- Miss TAM Wai-chu, Maria, GBS, JP

=== 1999 ===
- The Hon. Mrs FONG WONG Kut-man, Nellie, GBS, JP
- Mr LEE Tung-hai, Leo, GBS, JP
- Mr TANG Hsiang-chien, Leo, GBS, JP
- Mr SUEN Ming-yeung, Michael, GBS, JP
- The Hon. Mr Justice John Barry MORTIMER, GBS
- The Hon. LEUNG Chun-ying, GBS, JP
- The Hon. LEUNG Kam-chung, Antony, GBS, JP
- Mr CHAN Cho Chak, John, GBS, JP
- Mr WONG Hong-yuen, Peter, GBS, JP
- Mr WONG Kin-lap, GBS
- The Hon. Mr Justice LIU Tsz-ming, Benjamin, GBS
- Dr the Hon. CH'IEN Kuo-fung, Raymond, GBS, JP
- Mrs FOK LO Shiu-ching, Katherine, GBS, JP
- The Hon. Mr Justice Noel Plunkett POWER, GBS
- Mr KWONG Hon-sang, GBS, JP
- The Hon. TAM Yiu-chung, GBS, JP
- Mr Ian George McCurdy WINGFIELD, GBS, JP

=== 2000 ===
- The Hon. LEE Yeh-kwong, Charles, GBS, JP
- The Hon. TANG Ying-yen, Henry, GBS, JP
- The Hon. CHUNG, Shui-ming, GBS, JP
- Mr WONG Shing-wah, Dominic, GBS, OBE, JP
- Mr LAM Woon-kwong, GBS, JP
- Mr LAN Hong-tsung, David, GBS, JP
- The Hon. Mr Justice Gerald Paul NAZARETH, GBS, JP
- Prof. LI Kwok-cheung, Arthur, GBS, JP
- Prof. WOO Chia-wei, CBE, GBS, JP,
- Dr Hari Naroomal HARILELA, GBS, JP
- Dr LEE Hon-chiu, GBS, JP
- Mr LEUNG Nai-pang, GBS, JP
- Mr CHAN Wing-kee, GBS, JP
- Dr CHAN Yau-hing, Robin, GBS, JP
- Dr LAU Wah-sum, GBS, JP
- Dr CHUNG Chi-yung, GBS
- Mr Peter Dennis Antony SUTCH, GBS

=== 2001 ===
- Miss YUE Chung-yee, Denise, GBS, JP
- Mr IP Shu-kwan, Stephen, GBS, JP
- The Hon. TIEN Pei-chun, James, GBS, JP
- Dr the Hon. David LI Kwok-po, GBS, JP
- The Hon. LAU Hon-chuen, Ambrose, GBS, JP
- The Hon. Mr Justice WONG Kin-chow, Michael, GBS
- Mr YAM Chi-kwong, Joseph, GBS, JP
- Mr George HO, GBS, JP
- Mr Ronald Joseph ARCULLI, GBS, JP
- Dr TSUI Tsin-tong, GBS, JP
- Dr LEONG Che-hung, Edward, GBS, JP
- Dr WONG Kin-hang, Philip, GBS, JP
- Dr WU Wai-yung, Raymond, GBS, JP
- Mr LIU Lit-man, GBS, JP
- Mr LO Chung-wing, Victor, GBS, JP
- Mr James Kerr FINDLAY, GBS
- Mr HUI Ki-on, GBS
- Mr CHENG Kar-shun, Henry, GBS
- Mr Martin Gilbert BARROW, GBS
- Mr TSE Sze-wing, Edmund, GBS

=== 2002 ===
- Mr CHAU Tak-hay, GBS, JP
- Mrs YAM KWAN Pui-ying, Lily, GBS, JP
- Mrs IP LAU Suk-yee, Regina, GBS, JP
- Mr LEE Shing-see, GBS, JP
- Mrs CHOW LIANG Shuk-yee, Selina, GBS, JP
- The Hon. TSANG Yok-sing, Jasper, GBS, JP
- Prof. CHANG, Hsin-kang, GBS, JP
- Prof. POON Chung-kwong, GBS, JP
- Prof. TAM Sheung-wai, GBS, JP
- The Hon. Mr Justice WOO Kwok-hing, GBS
- Mr Stuart Wreford HARBINSON, GBS, JP
- Mr NG Wing-fui, Nicholas, GBS, JP
- Mr HU Fa-kuang, GBS, JP
- Dr CHAN Sui-kau, GBS, JP
- Prof. YOUNG Tse-tse, Rosie, GBS, JP
- Dr CHENG Wai-kin, Edgar, GBS, JP
- Mr Gordon SIU, GBS, JP
- Dr CHENG CHANG Yung-tsung, Alice, GBS

=== 2003 ===
- Mr TSANG Yam-pui, GBS
- The Hon. Mr Justice LEONG Shiu-chung, Arthur, GBS
- Dr the Hon. LI Ka-cheung, Eric, GBS, JP
- Dr the Hon. WONG Yu-hong, Philip, GBS
- Prof. CHEN Kwan-yiu, Edward, GBS, JP
- Dr KUNG Ziang-mien, James, GBS
- Mrs LAW FAN Chiu-fun, Fanny, GBS, JP
- Mr LAI Nin, Alan, GBS, JP
- Mrs LAM PEI Yu-dja, Peggy, GBS, JP
- Dr LAM LEE Kiu-yue, Alice Piera, GBS, JP
- Dr HUI Chi-ming, GBS, JP
- Mr CHENG Mo-chi, Moses, GBS, JP
- Dr LO Ka-shui, GBS, JP
- The Hon. Michael D. KADOORIE, GBS
- Dr HO Hung-sun, Stanley, GBS
- Mr YUAN Geng, GBS
- Mr Simon Herbert MAYO, GBS
- Dr FUNG Kwok-king, Victor, GBS
- Mr FUNG Siu-por, Lawrence, GBS
- Mr James Edward THOMPSON, GBS

=== 2004 ===
- The Hon. FOK Tsun-ting, Timothy, GBS, JP
- The Hon. LAU Kin-yee, Miriam, GBS, JP
- The Hon. IP Kwok-him, GBS, JP
- Mr Haider Hatim Tyebjee BARMA, GBS, JP
- Dr CHOW Yei-ching, GBS
- Sir Gordon WU Ying-sheung, GBS
- Mr LEUNG Po-wing, Bowen, GBS, JP
- Mr FANG Hung, Kenneth, GBS, JP
- Mr David Gordon ELDON, GBS, JP
- Mr SZE Cho-cheung, Michael, GBS, JP
- Mr YUEN Mo, GBS, JP
- Dr Allan ZEMAN, GBS, JP
- Dr CHOA Wing-sien, George, GBS, JP
- Mr CHENG Wai-chee, Christopher, GBS, JP
- Ms YIP Wai-jane, GBS

=== 2005 ===
- The Hon. MA Lik, GBS, JP
- Prof. NG Ching-fai, GBS
- Dr LUI Che-woo, GBS, JP
- Dr YEOH Eng-kiong, GBS, JP
- Mr YEUNG Kai-yin, GBS, JP
- Mr CHENG Hoi-chuen, Vincent, GBS, JP
- Mr Eric Charles BARNES, GBS

=== 2006 ===
- The Hon. Bernard Charnwut CHAN, GBS, JP
- Ir. LO Yiu-ching, GBS, JP
- Mr CHAU How-chen, GBS, JP
- Mr YU Kwok-chun, GBS, JP
- Ms LEE Lai-kuen, Shelley, GBS, JP
- Dr MONG Man-wai, William, GBS

=== 2007 ===
- The Hon. CHEUNG Kin-chung, Matthew, GBS, JP
- The Hon. Mrs.LEUNG LAU Yau-fun, Sophie, GBS, JP
- The Most Venerable The Hon. KOK Kwong, GBS
- Mr HO Sai-chu, GBS, JP
- Dr YU Sun-say, Jose, GBS, JP
- Dr HO Chi-ping, Patrick, GBS, JP
- Dr LIAO Sau-tung, Sarah Mary, GBS, JP
- Mr LEE Ming-kwai, GBS
- The Most Reverend KWONG Kong-kit, Peter, GBS

=== 2008 ===
- The Hon. CHENG Yiu-tong, GBS, JP
- The Hon. LIAO Cheung-sing, Andrew, GBS, SC, JP
- Dr the Hon. CHEUNG Kin-tung, Marvin, GBS, JP
- Mr FONG Ching, Eddy, GBS, JP
- Mr LAM Chung-lun, Billy, GBS, JP
- Mrs LEUNG WONG Bei-fong, Sally, GBS, JP
- Dr WONG Chi-yun, Allan, GBS, JP
- Mr WU Ting-yuk, Anthony, GBS, JP

=== 2009 ===
- The Hon. LAM Sui-lung, Stephen, GBS, JP
- The Hon. LEE Siu-kwong, Ambrose, GBS, IDSM, JP
- Dr the Hon. CHOW Yat-ngok, York, GBS, JP
- The Hon. Mrs CHA SHIH May-lung, Laura, GBS, JP
- Prof. the Hon. CHEUNG Bing-leung, Anthony, GBS, JP
- The Hon. CHEUNG Hok-ming, GBS, JP
- The Hon. Mr Justice Michael STUART-MOORE, GBS
- Mr HO Chi-ming, Kevin, GBS, JP
- Dr CHOI Chee-ming, Francis, GBS, JP
- Ms TAI Yuen-ying, Alice, GBS, JP
- Dr WU James Tak, GBS
- Mr MA Si-hang, Frederick, GBS

=== 2010 ===
- The Hon. TSANG Tak-sing, GBS, JP
- The Hon. Mrs LAM CHENG Yuet-ngor, Carrie, GBS, JP
- The Hon. LEUNG Kwan-yuen, Andrew, GBS, JP
- Mr LEE, Kai-ming, GBS, JP
- Mr CHOW Man-yiu, Paul, GBS, JP
- Mr HUI Chun-fui, Victor, GBS, JP
- Dr TAI Tak-fung, GBS, JP
- Mrs YAU TSANG Ka-lai, Carrie, GBS, JP
- ~~Mr CHEUNG Chun-yuen, Barry, GBS, JP~~ (Revoked in 2022)
- Mr CHAN Chun-yuen, Thomas, GBS, JP
- Mr MAK Chai-kwong, GBS, JP
- Mr Albert Jinghan CHENG, GBS, JP

=== 2011 ===
- The Hon. YAU Tang-wah, Edward, GBS, JP
- The Hon. Eva CHENG, GBS, JP
- Prof. the Hon. LAU Juen-yee, Lawrence, GBS, JP
- The Hon. WU Hung-yuk, Anna, GBS, JP
- The Hon. LAM Kin-fung, Jeffrey, GBS, JP
- Prof. TSUI Lap-chee, GBS, JP
- Ms TING Yuk-chee, Christina, GBS, JP
- Dr CHAN Tung, GBS, JP
- Ms CHENG Yeuk-wah, Teresa, GBS, SC, JP
- Miss CHOI Ying-pik, Yvonne, GBS, JP
- The Hon. Mr Justice Anthony Gordon ROGERS, GBS, QC, JP
- Mr SO Chak-kwong, Jack, GBS, JP
- Mr TANG King-shing, GBS, PDSM
- Mr HUI Wing-mau, GBS
- The Hon. Mrs Justice Doreen Maria LE PICHON, GBS
- Mrs LAU NG Wai-lan, Rita, GBS

=== 2012 ===
- Prof. the Hon. CHAN Ka-keung, Ceajer, GBS, JP
- The Hon. SO Kam-leung, Gregory, GBS, JP
- The Hon. TAM Chi-yuen, GBS, JP
- Dr TONG Hin-ming, Timothy, GBS
- Mr TANG Kwok-bun, Benjamin, GBS, JP
- The Hon. Mr Justice Michael John HARTMANN, GBS
- Mr CHAN Tak-lam, Norman, GBS, JP
- Prof. Gabriel M. LEUNG, GBS, JP
- Prof. LAU Siu-kai, GBS, JP
- Mr CHEN Nan-lok, Philip, GBS, JP
- Mr YEUNG Ka-sing, GBS, JP
- Mr CHUNG Pui-lam, GBS, JP
- Mr HO Suen-wai, Francis, GBS, JP
- Ms BIRCH LEE Suk-yee, Sandra, GBS, JP
- Prof. Felice LIEH-MAK, GBS, JP
- Ir Ronald James BLAKE, GBS, JP

=== 2013 ===
- The Hon. SHEK Lai-him, Abraham, GBS, JP
- Mr NG Sze-fuk, George, GBS, JP
- Mr LEE Chung-tak, Joseph, GBS, JP
- Prof. LEE Chack-fan, GBS, JP
- Prof. CHOW Wing-sun, Nelson, GBS, JP
- Ms YANG Mun-tak, Marjorie, GBS, JP
- Mr LEE Cho-jat, GBS
- The Hon. Sir Gerard BRENNAN, GBS
- Ms CHAN Shuk-leung, GBS

=== 2014 ===
- The Hon. Mr Justice Frank STOCK, GBS, JP
- The Right Hon. the Lord HOFFMANN, GBS
- Miss AU King-chi, GBS, JP
- Dr CHAN Chung-bun, Bunny, GBS, JP
- Ir Dr WONG Kwok-keung, GBS, JP
- Mr HUNG Chao-hong, Albert, GBS, JP
- Dr LAW Chi-kwong, GBS, JP
- Dr CHOI Koon-shum, Jonathan, GBS, JP
- Mr Duncan Warren PESCOD, GBS, JP
- Mr YOUNG Lap-moon, Raymond, GBS, JP
- Mr WU Moon-hoi, Marco, GBS

=== 2015 ===
- The Hon. CHOW Chung-kong, GBS, JP
- The Right Hon. the Lord MILLETT, GBS
- The Hon. CHEUNG Yu-yan, GBS, JP
- Mr WONG Hung-chiu, Raymond, GBS, JP
- Dr WONG Ying-wai, Wilfred, GBS, JP
- Dr LEE Ka-kit, Peter, GBS, JP
- Mr WAI Chi-sing, GBS, JP
- Mr LAM Shu-chit, GBS
- Mr KAN Fook-yee, GBS
- Mr TSANG Wai-hung, GBS, PDSM
- Mr KOO Joseph, GBS
- The Right Hon. the Lord WOOLF, GBS
- Dr LAM Kin-ngok, Peter, GBS
- Mr CHOI Park-lai, GBS

=== 2016 ===
- The Hon. LAI Tung-kwok, GBS, IDSM, JP
- The Hon. WONG Kam-sing, GBS, JP
- The Hon. CHAN Mo-po, Paul, GBS, MH, JP
- The Hon. CHAN Kam-lam, GBS, JP
- The Hon. FANG Kang, Vincent, GBS, JP
- The Hon. Mr Justice TO Kwai-fung, Anthony, GBS
- Mr TUNG Chee-chen, GBS, JP
- Ms WONG Sean-yee, Anissa, GBS, JP
- Mr YUEN Ming-fai, Richard, GBS, JP
- Miss TAM Kam-lan, Annie, GBS, JP
- Ms KI Man-fung, Leonie, GBS, JP
- Mr PANG Yiu-kai, GBS, JP
- Dr YEUNG Chun-kam, Charles, GBS, JP
- Mr LIU Changle, GBS, JP
- Mr LO Man-tuen, GBS, JP
- Mr Winfried ENGELBRECHT-BRESGES, GBS, JP
- Mr LAM Kwong-siu, GBS
- Mr TANG Kwok-wai, Paul, GBS, JP

=== 2017 ===
- The Hon. NG Hak-kim, Eddie, GBS, JP
- Dr the Hon. KO Wing-man, GBS, JP
- The Hon. CHEUNG Chi-kong, GBS, JP
- The Hon. YANG Wei-hsiung, Nicholas, GBS, JP
- The Hon. CHEUNG Wan-ching, Clement, GBS, JP
- The Hon. SUI Wai-keung, Stephen, GBS, JP
- The Hon. MA Siu-cheung, Eric, GBS, JP
- Mr SUN Tak-kei, David, GBS, JP
- The Hon. WONG Ting-kwong, GBS, JP
- The Hon. CHAN Kin-por, GBS, JP
- The Hon. Mr Justice FUNG Wah, Barnabas, GBS
- Mr LAW Chi-kong, Joshua, GBS, JP
- Mr SHIU Sin-por, GBS, JP
- Miss HO Shuk-yee, Susie, GBS, JP
- Mr NG Leung-ho, GBS, JP
- Prof. CHOW Chun-kay, Stephen, GBS, JP
- Mr MA Ho-fai, GBS, JP
- Ms KAO Ching-chi, Sophia, GBS, JP
- Mr LAU Ping-cheung, GBS, JP
- Dr LI Sau-hung, Eddy, GBS, JP
- Dr WONG Yau-kar, David, GBS, JP
- Mr LAU Ming-wai, GBS, JP
- Mr CHUNG Chi-ping, Roy, GBS, JP
- Mr IP Sik-on, Simon, GBS, JP
- Ms LAM Shuk-yee, GBS

=== 2018 ===
- The Right Hon. the Lord NEUBERGER of Abbotsbury, GBS
- Mr LIN Sun-mo, Willy, GBS, JP
- Mr HON Chi-keung, GBS, JP
- Mr FONG Yun-wah, Henry, GBS, JP
- Mr Thomas Brian STEVENSON, GBS, JP
- Prof. YUEN Kwok-yung, GBS, JP
- Mr Charles Nicholas BROOKE, GBS, JP
- Mr CHENG Wai-sun, Edward, GBS, JP
- Mr KUNG Lin-cheng, Leo, GBS, JP
- The Hon. Mr Justice Michael Victor LUNN, GBS

=== 2019 ===
- The Hon. LIAO Cheung-kong, Martin, GBS, JP
- The Right Hon. the Lord WALKER of Gestingthorpe, GBS
- The Most Reverend Dr KWONG Paul, GBS
- Mr WONG Ho-yuen, Andrew, GBS, JP
- Mr YING Yiu-hong, Stanley, GBS, JP
- Mrs LAI CHAN Chi-kuen, Marion, GBS, JP
- Mr NG Sau-kei, Wilfred, GBS, MH, JP
- Mr TONG Carlson, GBS, JP
- Prof. LEONG Chi-yan, John, GBS, JP
- Dr CHEN Cheng-jen, Clement, GBS, JP
- Mr CHEUK Wing-hing, GBS, JP

=== 2020 ===
- Mr LO Wai-chung, Stephen, GBS, PDSM, JP
- The Hon. Mr Justice Anthony Murray GLEESON, GBS
- The Hon. MA Fung-kwok, GBS, JP
- Miss LAU Yin-wah, Emma, GBS, JP
- Ms TSE Man-yee, Elizabeth, GBS, JP
- Mr CHOW Tat-ming, Thomas, GBS, JP
- Mr LAI Yee-tak, Joseph, GBS, JP
- Mr TONG Chi-keung, Donald, GBS, JP
- Ms CHAN Yuen-han, GBS, JP
- Mr PANG Cheung-wai, Thomas, GBS, JP
- Dr TAM Kam-kau, GBS, JP
- Mr WONG Tung-shun, Peter, GBS, JP
- Mr LAU, James Henry Jr., GBS, JP
- Mr KUNG Chun-lung, GBS, JP
- Mr NG Woon-yim, GBS, MH

=== 2021 ===
- The Hon. Wong Kwok-kin, GBS, JP
- Ir Dr The Hon. Lo Wai-kwok, GBS, MH, JP
- The Hon. Mr Justice Yeung Chun-kuen, GBS
- The Hon. Mr Justice Ian Charles McWalters, GBS, SC, JP
- Ms Chang King-yiu, GBS, JP
- Mrs Tse Ling Kit-ching, Cherry, GBS, JP
- Mr Yung Wai-hung, Philip, GBS, JP
- Mrs Fung Ching Suk-yee, Betty, GBS, JP
- Ms Cheng Mei-sze, Maisie, GBS, JP
- Mr Lam Sai-hung, GBS, JP
- Ms Wong Wai-ching, GBS, JP
- Mr Yu Pang-chun, GBS, JP
- Mr Yau How-boa, Stephen, GBS, MH, JP
- Prof. Chen Hung-yee, Albert, GBS, JP
- Mr Tang Ching-ho, GBS, JP
- Mr Lee Ka-shing, Martin, GBS, JP
- Mr Yiu Chi-shing, GBS, JP
- Mr Ian Grenville Cross, GBS, SC

=== 2022 ===
- The Hon. Chan Kwok-ki, Eric, GBS, IDSM, JP
- The Hon. Wong Wai-lun, Michael, GBS, JP
- The Hon. Tong Ka-wah, Ronny, GBS, SC, JP
- The Hon. Yeung Yun-hung, Kevin, GBS, JP
- The Hon. Tsang Kwok-wai, Erick, GBS, IDSM, JP
- The Hon. Hui Ching-yu, Christopher, GBS, JP
- The Hon. Tang Ping-keung, GBS, IDSM, JP
- Dr The Hon. Chan Ching-har, Eliza, GBS, JP
- Mr Chan Fan, Frank, GBS
- Prof. Chan Siu-chee, Sophia, GBS
- Mr Nip Tak-kuen, Patrick, GBS
- Mr Sit Wing-hang, Alfred, GBS
- Mr Peh Yun-lu, Simon, GBS, IDSM
- Mr Chu Nai-cheung, John, GBS
- The Hon. Lee Wai-king, Starry, GBS, JP
- Mr Tang Yun-kwong, Roy, GBS, JP
- Ms Choi Suk-han, Annie, GBS, JP
- Dr Lam Tai-fai, GBS, JP
- Mr Cheung Wah-fung, Christopher, GBS, JP
- Prof. Leung Wing-cheung, William, GBS, JP
- Mr Hui Chung-shing, Herman, GBS, MH, JP
- Mr Chan Ka-kui, GBS, JP
- Mr Lam Tin-fuk, Frederick, GBS, JP
- Dr Auyeung Pak-kuen, Rex, GBS, JP
- Dr Wang Ming-chun, Elizabeth, GBS

=== 2023 ===
- The Right Hon. the Lord PHILLIPS of Worth Matravers, GBS
- The Hon. YICK Chi-ming, Frankie, GBS, JP
- Mr Raj Sital MOTWANI, GBS, JP
- Miss WONG Tin-yu, Agnes, GBS, JP
- Prof. HU Shao-ming, GBS, JP
- Ms CHAN Suk-mei, May, GBS, JP
- Prof. WONG Yuk-shan, GBS, JP
- Mr LUI Tim-leung, Tim, GBS, JP
- Mr TANG Yat-sun, Richard, GBS, JP
- Mr CHEUNG Kwok-wing, Paul, GBS, JP

=== 2024 ===
- Prof. the Hon. Priscilla LEUNG Mei-fun, GBS, JP (formerly Silver Bauhinia Star recipient in 2013)
- The Hon. Justice Maria Candace Yuen Ka-ning, GBS, J.A.
- Justice Dr Datuk TAN Siu Lin
- Eliza LEE Man-ching, GBS, JP
- Prof. Ir CHAN Ching-chuen, GBS, member of Chinese Academy of Engineering
- Cathy CHU Man-ling, GBS, JP
- Joe WONG Chi-cho, GBS, JP
- LEE Kwok-tung, GBS, JP
- Samuel YUNG Wing-Kei, GBS, MH, JP
- KAN Chi-ho, GBS, MH
- Kenneth CHEN Wei-on, GBS
- Robert NG Chee-siong, GBS

=== 2025 ===
- The Honourable LAM Ting-kwok, Paul, G.B.S., S.C., J.P.
- Dr. the Honourable LAM Ching-choi, G.B.S., J.P.
- The Honourable NG Chau-pei, Stanley, G.B.S., J.P.
- Mr. SIU Chak-yee, G.B.S., P.D.S.M.
- The Honourable Madam Justice POON Man-kay, Maggie, G.B.S.
- The Honourable Madam Justice PANG Po-kam, Anthea, G.B.S.
- Mr. LEUNG Cheuk-man, Clement, G.B.S., J.P.
- Ms. LI Mei-sheung, Michelle, G.B.S., J.P.
- Miss LAU Lee-kwan, Vivian, G.B.S., J.P.
- Miss TSE Siu-wa, Janice, G.B.S., J.P.
- Ms. FOO Siu-wai, Gracie, G.B.S., J.P.
- Mr. MAK Tak-wai, Eddie, G.B.S., J.P.
- Ms. CHEN Sheau-ling, Cecilia Daisy, G.B.S., M.H., J.P.
- Mr. CHAN Iu-seng, Star, G.B.S., J.P.
- Mr. SZE Irons, G.B.S., J.P.
- Mr. CHOI Ka-tsan, Karson, G.B.S., J.P.
- Dr. LAM Ko-yin, Colin, G.B.S.
- Ms. LAU Chi-wai, Edwina, G.B.S., P.D.S.M.
- Mr. AU Chi-kwong, G.B.S., P.D.S.M.
- Mr. KAN Kai-yan, G.B.S., P.D.S.M.

== See also ==
- Silver Bauhinia Star
- Bronze Bauhinia Star
