= Grand Bauhinia Medal =

Hong Kong award

Grand Bauhinia Medal 大紫荊勳章
- Grand Bauhinia Medal with ribbon
- Awarded for: lifelong and highly significant contribution to the well-being of Hong Kong
- Presented by: Hong Kong
- Post-nominals: GBM
- Established: 1997
- First award: 1997

Precedence
- Next (lower): Gold Bauhinia Star

Grand Bauhinia Medal
- Traditional Chinese: 大紫荊勳章
- Simplified Chinese: 大紫荆勋章
Transcriptions
Standard Mandarin
- Hanyu Pinyin: Dà Zǐjīng Xūn Zhāng
Yue: Cantonese
- Jyutping: daai6 zi2 ging1 fan1 zoeng1

The Grand Bauhinia Medal (Chinese: 大紫荊勳章) is the highest award under the Hong Kong honours and awards system; it is to recognise the selected person's lifelong and highly significant contribution to the well-being of Hong Kong. The awardee is entitled to the postnominal letters GBM and the style The Honourable. The award was created in 1997 to replace the British honours system, following the transfer of sovereignty to the People's Republic of China and the establishment of the Hong Kong Special Administrative Region. The list was empty from 2003 to 2004. Bauhinia, Bauhinia blakeana, is the floral emblem of Hong Kong.

== List of recipients ==
Year of appointment	Recipient	Appointed for	Remarks
1997	Ann Tse-kai		
1997	Lee Quo-wei		
1997	Simon Li		
1997	Elsie Tu		
1997	Cha Chi Ming		
1997	Tsui Sze-man		
1997	Chuang Shih-ping		
1997	Wong Ker-lee		
1997	Tsang Hin-chi		
1997	Henry Fok		
1997	Chung Sze-yuen		
1997	Lo Tak-shing		
1998	Arnaldo de Oliveira Sales		
1998	Ng Hong-mun		
1998	Run Run Shaw		
1998	Wong Po-yan		
1999	Lee Chark-tim		
1999	Anson Chan		
1999	Yang Ti-liang		
1999	Sidney Gordon		
1999	William Purves		
2000	Henry Litton		
2000	Charles Ching		
2000	Mo Kwan-nin		
2000	Jin Yong		
2000	Jao Tsung-I		
2001	Harry Fang		
2001	Li Ka-shing		
2001	Yeung Kwong		
2002	Donald Tsang		
2002	Elsie Leung		
2002	David Akers-Jones		
2002	Chang-Lin Tien		
2003	No appointments were made		
2004	No appointments were made		
2005	Lau Wong-fat		
2005	Chiang Chen		
2006	Charles Lee		
2006	Leo Lee Tung-hai		
2006	Tung Chee-hwa		
2007	Rita Fan		
2007	~~Rafael Hui~~		Revoked in 2018
2007	David Li		
2007	Lee Shau-kee		
2008	Andrew Li		
2008	Henry Hu		
2008	Cheng Yu-tung		
2008	Chan Sui-kau		
2009	Henry Tang		
2009	Hari Harilela		
2009	Joseph Yam		
2010	John Tsang		
2010	Ronald Arculli		
2010	Edward Leong		
2010	Stanley Ho		
2010	Victor Fung		
2010	Tin Ka Ping		
2010	Charles K. Kao		
2011	Leung Chun-ying		
2011	Allan Zeman		
2012	Geoffrey Ma		
2012	Stephen Lam		
2012	Wong Yan-lung		
2012	Kemal Bokhary		
2012	Peter Woo		
2012	Lui Che-woo		
2013	Patrick Chan		
2013	Anthony Mason		
2013	Sik Kok Kwong		
2013	Maria Tam		
2014	Jose Yu		
2014	Charles Ho		
2015	Jasper Tsang		
2015	Cheng Yiu-tong		
2015	Ho Sai-chu		
2015	Li Dak-sum		
2016	Carrie Lam		
2016	Tam Yiu-chung		
2016	Chan Wing-kee		
2016	Victor Lo		
2016	Hu Fa-kuang		
2016	Moses Cheng		
2016	Lap-Chee Tsui		
2017	Matthew Cheung		
2017	Paul Chan Mo-po		
2017	Rimsky Yuen		
2017	Laura Cha		
2017	Arthur Li		
2017	Fanny Law		
2017	Ip Kwok-him		
2017	Vincent Lo		
2017	Henry Cheng		
2017	Tai Tak-fung		
2017	Jack So		
2017	Ronnie Chan		
2018	Robert Tang		
2018	Cheung Hok-ming		
2018	Robin Chan		
2018	Rosie Young Tse-tse		
2019	Yu Kwok-chun		
2019	Albert Hung Chao-hong		
2020	Andrew Leung		
2020	Bernard Charnwut Chan		
2020	Chan Tung		
2020	Xu Rongmao		
2021	Andrew Cheung		
2021	Teresa Cheng		
2021	Chow Chung-kong		
2021	Regina Ip		
2021	Bunny Chan		
2021	Jonathan Choi Koon-shum		
2021	Lo Man-tuen		
2022	John Lee		
2022	Tommy Cheung		
2022	Roberto Ribeiro		
2022	Andrew Liao		
2022	Wilfred Wong Ying-wai		
2022	Peter Lam		
2022	Ng Leung-ho		
2023	Jeffrey Lam Kin-fung		
2023	Poon Chung-kwong		
2023	Timothy Fok Tsung-ting		
2023	Lam Shuk-yee		
2023	Sze Chi-ching		
2024	Martin Liao		
2024	Lau Siu-kai		
2024	Lee Chack-fan		
2024	Peter Lee Ka-kit		
2024	Lam Shu Chit		
2025	Lawrence Fung Siu Por		
2025	Charles Yeung Chun-kam		
2025	John Leong Chi-yan		
Source: Government of Hong Kong

== See also ==
- Orders, decorations, and medals of Hong Kong
