= Leo Lee Tung-hai =

Hong Kong businessman

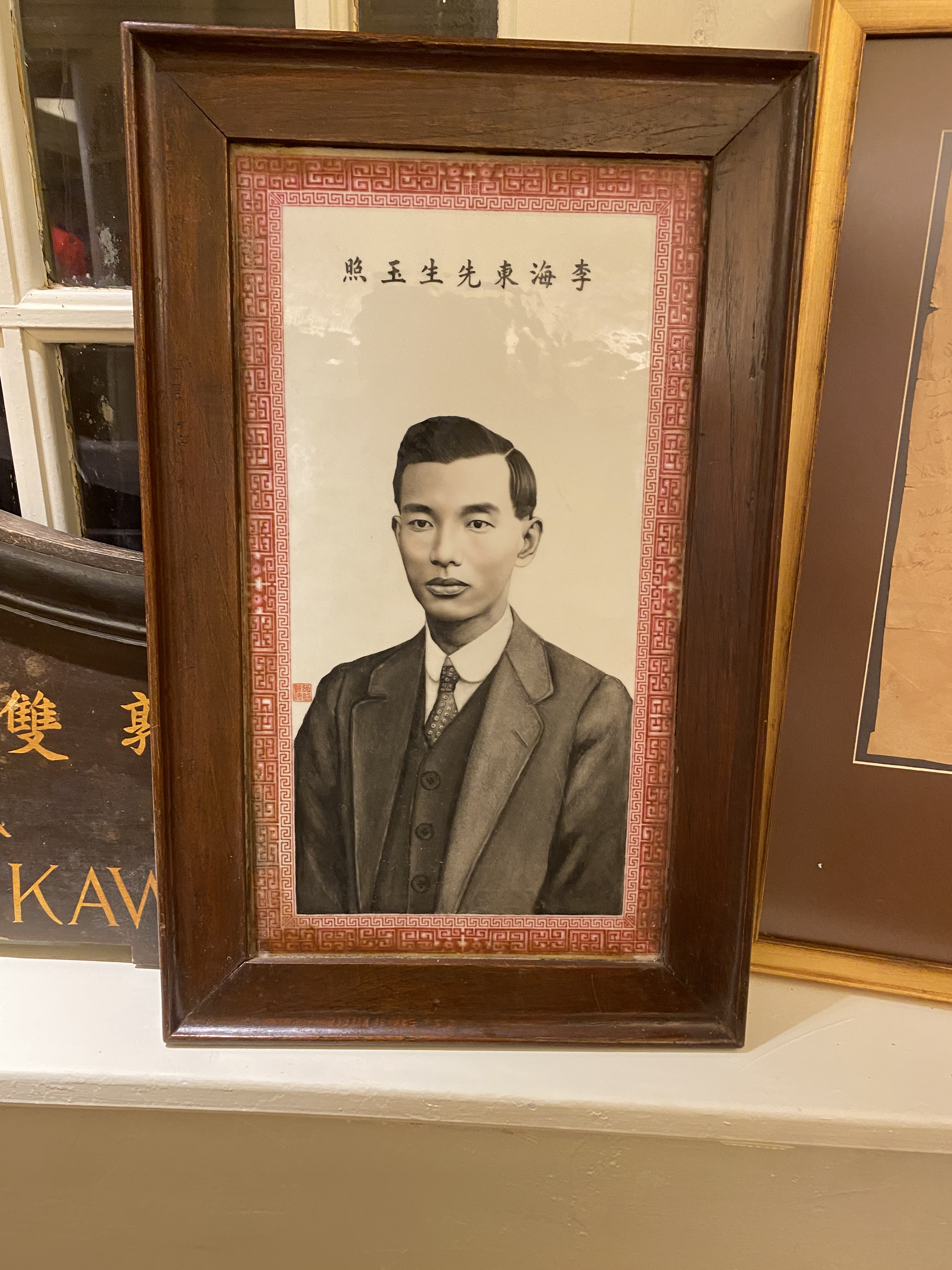
Portrait of Lee Tung-hai

Leo Lee Tung-hai GBM GBS OBE JP (Chinese: 李東海; 1921 – 8 June 2010) was the chairman of the board of the Tung Wah Group of Hospitals from 1970 to 1971, businessman and philanthropist in Hong Kong. Lee died on 8 June 2010.

== Career ==
Lee founded the Tung Tai Trading Corporation in 1952. Further companies in the Tung Tai Group followed with Dr Lee serving as chairman. He also served as a member of the 7th Chinese People's Political Consultative Conference and a Standing Committee member of the 8th and 9th Chinese People's Political Consultative Conferences.

== Awards ==
In 1983, he was conferred an Officer of the Most Excellent Order of the British Empire (OBE). In 1999, Lee was awarded a Gold Bauhinia Star by the Hong Kong Government and an Honorary Doctor of Laws by the University of Victoria, Canada. In 2002, Lee became an Honorary Citizen of Zhongshan City in Guangdong, China. In 2006, Lee was awarded with the Grand Bauhinia Medal by the Hong Kong Government.
