= Ching-Chuen Chan =

Indonesian engineer and academic (born 1937)

Ching Chuen Chan
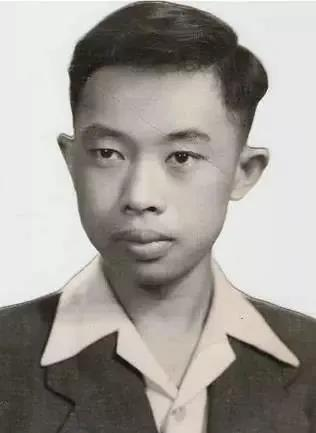
- Chan in 1950
- Born: 1937 (age 88–89); Magelang, Dutch East Indies
- Other name: C. C. Chan
- Education: Ph.D. Electrical Engineering, University of Hong Kong 1982
- Known for: Academic Achievements in Electrical Engineering and Technology
- Awards: World Federation of Engineering Organization's Medal of Engineering Excellence Royal Academy of Engineering Prince Philip Medal Guanghua Engineering Science and Technology Prize Gold Bauhinia Star

Ching-Chuen Chan (born January 1937), also known as C. C. Chan and Chan Ching-chuen, is an Indonesian-born Hong Kong electrical engineer and academic known for his work on electric vehicle technology. He was Honda Chair Professor of Engineering at the University of Hong Kong and founded the International Research Center for Electric Vehicles there in 1986.

Chan's research has focused on electric vehicles, electrical machines, and energy systems. Sources credit him with early work on the use of alternating current motors in electric vehicles, and he has authored or co-authored technical papers and books on electric vehicle technology. He has received awards including the World Federation of Engineering Organizations Medal of Engineering Excellence, the Royal Academy of Engineering Prince Philip Medal, the Guanghua Engineering Science and Technology Prize, and the Gold Bauhinia Star.

== History ==
Ching-Chuen Chan was born in January, 1937 in Magelang, Indonesia. His father ran a taxi and bus business in Java. It was while visiting the business's garage that Chan became interested in cleaner running vehicles that would be free of smoke and oil.

With the need for rebuilding after World War II, Chan was motivated to pursue a career in engineering with an interest in alternative energy sources. He obtained his Bachelor of Science in Electrical Engineering in 1957 from China University of Mining & Technology. In 1959, he earned his Master of Science in Electrical Engineering from Tsinghua University. In 1982, he completed his Ph.D. in Electrical Engineering at the University of Hong Kong. In 2008, He was awarded the Honorary Doctor of Technology Degree from Loughborough University in the UK, and was made an Honorary Member of the Hungarian Academy of Engineering in 2013.

== Career ==
Chan's influence on electric vehicles dates back to the 1970s during the oil crisis. A test center for electric vehicles was established in Hawaii. As a published author on electric vehicles, Chan was sought out by the US for his expertise.

In 1981, he began his tenure at the University of Hong Kong as a lecturer. In 1986, Chan established the International Research Center for Electric Vehicles at the University of Hong Kong, with backing from the U.S. Department of Energy and the University of Hawaii. In 1990, he organized the 10th International Electric Vehicle Symposium in Hong Kong. At the university, he became a Senior Lecturer, Reader, and ultimately served as the Honda Chair Professor of Engineering from 1994 to 2002. During this time, he also held the position of Head of the Department of Electrical & Electronic Engineering from 1994 to 2000.

Chan has held numerous academic positions at other institutions worldwide. In 1989, he served as a Visiting Professor at the University of California at Berkeley. In 1995, he held a similar position at MIT. In 1997, he was honored as the Faraday Memorial Lecturer in India. In 2000, he received the IEEE International Lecture Medal from the Institution of Electrical Engineers in the U.K., where he delivered an international lecture on electric vehicles. In 2001, he became a Bye-Fellow of Churchill College at Cambridge University. In 2002, he became a Guest Professor at the University of California at Davis, overseeing a post-graduate course on electric vehicles. Additionally, he has been recognized as a Distinguished Lecturer of the IEEE and has held the title of Honorary Professor at various institutions such as Tsinghua University, Shanghai Jiao Tong University, Harbin Institute of Technology, Southeast University, and as Dean of the School of Information and Electrical Engineering at China University of Mining and Technology.

In addition to academics, Chan served in government bodies and corporations. He was appointed by the Ministry of Science and Technology as a Chief Panelist of the "863" Key National Project Plan from 2001 to 2005. Chan also held positions as a Director at Altair Nanotechnologies, Inc. and then a Director at Rotoblock Corp. from 2005 to 2011. He held a position as a Member of the Science and Technology Sector of the 10th National Committee of the Chinese People's Political Consultative Conference (CPPCC). He also served as a Science and Technology Advisor to governmental bodies such as the Shandong Provincial Government, Wuhan Municipal Government, Harbin Municipal Government, and Shenyang Municipal Government. Furthermore, he provided advisory services to entities in the automobile, electrical, and electronic industries including Ford, Honda, Samsung, Siemens, ABB, GE, TNO Netherlands, ZAP, FAW, Chan An, ZTE, Shenhua Group, among others.

He was appointed by the Oakland Mayor to participate as a Member of the Task Force on Independence from Oil, with the objective of positioning Oakland as the first city globally to achieve oil independence in transportation by 2020. In 2010, he became an Independent Director at Harbin Electric, Inc. and the Chief Scientist at Yinlong Energy Co., Ltd. He was also an Independent Non-Executive Director at Azeus Systems Holdings Ltd. From 2008 until he retired in 2024.

== Contributions and recognition ==
Ching-Chuen Chan is considered a pioneer of modern electric vehicles for being the first to use alternating current (AC) in electric car motors. Over the years, he has been credited with over 400 technical papers, 11 books, and holds 10 patents that are licensed in both Japanese and Chinese industries. He has been recognized with several awards for his contributions to technology and engineering. In 2001, he was acknowledged as Asia's Best Technology Pioneer by Asiaweek. In 2013, he received the World Federation of Engineering Organizations Medal of Engineering Excellence, followed by the Royal Academy of Engineering Prince Philip Medal in 2014. He received the Guanghua Engineering Science and Technology Prize in 2016, and was awarded the Gold Bauhinia Star in 2024.

== See also ==
- Chinese People's Political Consultative Conference
- History of the electric vehicle
