= Charles Lee (Hong Kong politician) =

Hong Kong politician (born 1936)

Charles Lee Yeh-kwong
- Born: 16 July 1936 (age 89); Shanghai, China
- Education: University of London (M.L.)
- Occupations: accountant chartered secretary
- Organization: Executive Council of Hong Kong
- Title: Hong Kong Exchanges and Clearing Limited (chairman)

Charles Lee Yeh-kwong (Chinese: 李業廣), GBM, GBS, OBE, JP (born 16 July 1936, in Shanghai, China) was a non-official member of the Executive Council of Hong Kong and the Chairman of Hong Kong Exchanges and Clearing Limited.

After graduating from the University of London with a master's degree in law, Lee became a qualified solicitor in both Hong Kong and the United Kingdom. He is also a qualified accountant and a chartered secretary.

Order of precedence
Preceded by Elsie Leung; Recipient of the Grand Bauhinia Medal	Hong Kong order of precedence Recipient of the Grand Bauhinia Medal	Succeeded by Rita Fan; Recipient of the Grand Bauhinia Medal
