= Li Dak-sum =

Hong Kong entrepreneur and philanthropist

Li Dak-sum, GBM, JP (Chinese: 李達三, born 9 October 1920) is a Hong Kong–based entrepreneur and philanthropist. Li received his Bachelor of Accounting degree from Fudan University in Chongqing, PRC in 1945. He is the Chairman of Sharp-Roxy (Hong Kong) Limited, Sharp-Roxy Corporation (Malaysia) SDN. BHD, and The Carlton Group of Hotels. Li also serves as the Chairman of various hotel operations in Singapore, Australia, and New Zealand. He was also an independent non-executive director of the Television Broadcasts Limited (TVB) from 1995 to 2009, a member of New Asia College's board of trustees, a member of the Court of the University of Hong Kong from 2003 to 2006 and Vice Chairman of the Tung Wah Group of Hospitals.

Loyal to his Ningbo roots, Li is the Founding President of the Ningbo Residents Association (Hong Kong), which established two Ning Po Colleges in Hong Kong.

Li helped to establish Dr Li Dak Sum Research and Development Fund in Orthopaedic Surgery, and, in 2015, the Dr Li Dak-Sum Research Centre in regenerative medicine, a partnership between the University of Hong Kong and the Karolinska Institutet.

Li was appointed a Justice of the Peace in 1977.

On 1 July 2015, Li was awarded the Grand Bauhinia Medal (GBM), the highest honour of the SAR, in recognition of his contributions to the higher education by making significant donations to universities and other education institutes. As of 2019, Li still played an active role in public life, making appearances at the age of 98, and he turned 100 on 9 October 2020.
