= Chang Hsin-kang =

Chang Hsin-kang, GBS, JP, FREng (simplified Chinese: 张信刚; traditional Chinese: 張信剛; pinyin: Zhāng Xìngāng; born 9 July 1940, Shenyang, Liaoning, China), was the president of City University of Hong Kong. He received his bachelor's degree in civil engineering from National Taiwan University in 1962, his master's degree in structural engineering from Stanford University in 1964, and his PhD in biomedical engineering from Northwestern University in 1969.

== Biography ==
Chang was Professor/Chairman of the Department of Biomedical Engineering at the University of Southern California (USC) from 1985 to 1990. He was a founding Dean of the School of Engineering at the Hong Kong University of Science and Technology in 1990, and the Dean of the School of Engineering of the University of Pittsburgh in 1994. He was appointed to be the President of the City University of Hong Kong in 1996; he retired in 2007. He was appointed a Fellow of the Royal Academy of Engineering in 2000.

He is an internationally known biomedical engineering expert, having published more than 100 scientific articles, as well as being the editor of two research monographs. He holds a Canadian patent.

On 27 June 2015 at the United International College's 7th Graduation Ceremony in Zhuhai, Chang Hsin-kang was rewarded with the Honorary Fellowships.

Academic offices
Preceded by Cheng Yiu-chung	President of the City University of Hong Kong; 1996–2007	Succeeded by Richard Ho; Acting
Order of precedence
Preceded by Selina Chow; Recipients of the Gold Bauhinia Star	Hong Kong order of precedence Recipients of the Gold Bauhinia Star	Succeeded by Poon Chung-kwong; Recipients of the Gold Bauhinia Star
