= Hari Harilela =

Businessman, hotelier and philanthropist

The Honourable Hari Harilela GBM, GBS, OBE, JP
- Hari Naroomal Harilela in 1980
- Born: 10 August 1922; Hyderabad, Sindh, British India (now Pakistan)
- Died: 29 December 2014 (aged 92); Kowloon Tong, Hong Kong
- Occupations: Hotelier, investor
- Spouse: Padma Harilela (m. 1951–2014)
- Children: Maya Harilela; Anita Hariela; Aron Hari Harilela; Nina Harilela; Shakun Harilela; Sheila Harilela
- Parent(s): Naroomal Lilaram Harilela (deceased); Devibai Harilela (deceased)
- Relatives: Siblings: George Harilela (d. 2006); Bob Harilela; Peter Harilela; Gary Harilela; Mohan "Mike" Harilela (d.2008); Rani Harilela Hiranand (d.2001); Sandee Harilela Premchand (d.2022)

Hari Naroomal Harilela, GBM GBS OBE JP (Chinese: 夏利萊; Jyutping: haa^{6} lei^{6} loi^{4}, 10 August 1922 – 29 December 2014) was a Hong Kong Indian businessman, hotelier and philanthropist and the founder and chairman of the Harilela Group. The group runs businesses ranging from hotel and real estate investment to import and export trading. He was often dubbed the richest Indian in Hong Kong.

== Background ==
Hari Harilela was born in Hyderabad, British India in 1922. His father Naroomal Lilaram Mirchandani (later renamed Naraindas Harilela) was the first of the family to venture to Hong Kong and Canton in search of his fortune and opened an antique shop there. Later, on receiving the news that his mother was very ill in Sindh, he rushed to India and was devastated to learn that his mother had just died upon his return. His family, without waiting for him, had already cremated her. Deeply hurt, he renounced the family name of Mirchandani and created his own surname by joining the names of his parents, Haribai and Lelaram. Thus was born the name Harilela.

Harilela moved to Canton with his mother and two brothers in 1930 to join his father, at the time his father owned various buildings and homes throughout China until repercussions of the Great Depression greatly damaged his business. The family once again found financial success selling fair-priced and high quality textile products to British soldiers during the Second World War.

== Business career ==
Harilela began a tailoring business in Hong Kong, opening a clothing and tailoring shop and then pioneered the idea of supplying custom-made suits by mail order. During his early life, he would act as mediator to settle disputes between Indian families. In 1959, Harilela realised the mail order boom is a temporary phase. So he diversified into real estate and moved into the hotel business, starting the Harilela Group with his brothers George and Peter in 1959.

By 2014, the group owns 19 major hotels in Hong Kong, including the Holiday Inn Golden Mile and the InterContinental Grand Stanford Hong Kong, both in Kowloon, as well as various others across Asia, two in Canada and one in London. The Harilela Group of hotels in the Asia-Pacific region includes properties in Hong Kong, Macau, Singapore, Penang, Bangkok and Sydney.

In 2012, Harilela stepped down as chairman but remained the honorary chairman until his death. Harilela's son Aron replaced him as the group's chairman.

== Public services ==
Harilela was highly regarded in the local Indian community. He had a great voice in the government on numerous ethnic minority issues and colonial governors and chief executives consulted Harilela. Harilela was also close friends with two former Chief Executives, Tung Chee-hwa and Donald Tsang Yam-kuen.

He was appointed member of the Hong Kong Basic Law Consultative Committee in 1985 and later appointed Hong Kong Affairs Advisor to the Government of the People's Republic of China in the 1990s. He was the Honorary Consul of Niger in Hong Kong until 2012.

He was member of the Hong Kong Chamber of Commerce, the most influential business chamber in the territory, Through the chamber he was elected the Hong Kong SAR Election Committee from 1996 to 2006 for the Commercial (First) sector, which was responsible for electing the Chief Executive of Hong Kong. He was also adviser of the Business and Professionals Federation of Hong Kong.

Harilela was also a Life Regent at Pepperdine University in the United States, and was an Honorary Court Member of the Hong Kong University of Science and Technology.

== Philanthropy ==
The Padma & Hari Harilela Lecture Theatres, with seating capacities of 250 and 150 respectively, were named in honour of the Harilelas in recognition of a HK$5 million donation to the Hong Kong Baptist University.

Hong Kong University of Science and Technology receives HK$5M donation from Dr Hari N Harilela to Enhance Teaching & Research Excellence. The lecture hall C (LT-C) was named "The Padma & Hari Harilela Lecture Theatres" in honour of the donation.

== Family and personal life ==
Harilela was the patriarch of the Harilela family with about 80 members. The family lives in a 40-bedroom mansion in Kowloon Tong, with the next generation living in a connecting house.

He was member of the Hong Kong Jockey Club.

Harilela died early morning on 29 December 2014 at his Kowloon Tong home surrounded by family at the age of 92. He is surrounded by his wife Padma, son Aron, daughters Nina, Anita and Shakun. More than 100 members of his extended family, including his two surviving brothers and one sister live in the Kowloon Tong mansion.

== Honours ==
He was made Justice of the Peace in 1963 and was awarded the Officer of the Order of the British Empire. He received the Gold Bauhinia Star in 2000 and the Grand Bauhinia Medal in 2009.

He was also a recipient of the Pravasi Bharatiya Samman from the Government of India. Harilela won a Lifetime Achievement Award at the 4th Annual Asia Pacific Hotel Industry Investment Conference on 27 March 2001.

== See also ==
- Indians in Hong Kong
