= Prince Philip Medal =

Royal Academy of Engineering award

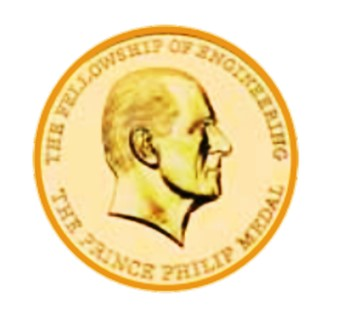
- Awarded for: Exceptional contributions to engineering
- Sponsored by: Royal Academy of Engineering
- Date: 1991
- Location: London
- Country: United Kingdom
- Presented by: Prince Philip
- Website: https://raeng.org.uk/programmes-and-prizes/prizes/prince-philip-medal/

The Prince Philip Medal is named after Prince Philip, Duke of Edinburgh, who was the Senior Fellow of the Royal Academy of Engineering (RAE). In 1989 Prince Philip agreed to the commissioning of solid gold medals to be "awarded periodically to an engineer of any nationality who has made an exceptional contribution to engineering as a whole through practice, management or education." The first of these medals was awarded in 1991 to Frank Whittle, co-creator of the turbojet engine.

== Background ==
The Prince Philip medal is awarded through the Royal Academy of Engineering. Nominations are opened around September each year. Candidates can be from any nationality and hence it is an international award. Although it is an annual award, at times when there is no qualified candidate, the medal is not awarded. Winners include people from industry and university.

== Winners ==
Prince Philip Medal winners
Year	Name	Topics
2024	Arogyaswami Paulraj	For pioneering the invention of Multiple-Input, Multiple-Output (MIMO) technology, the foundation for all current and future broadband wireless communications.
2022	Asad Madni	For his work behind Hubble Space Telescope control system and passenger safety technology. His decades’ long career developing and commercialising intelligent sensors and systems across the aerospace, manufacturing and transportation industries.
2021	Gladys West	Whose mathematical modelling paved the way for the engineering innovation of GPS (the first woman to be awarded the medal).
2020	Bob Stuart	Exceptional contribution to audio engineering in the music and film industries.
2018	Lucien Bronicki	Awarded for his outstanding work in developing new technologies to harness the earth's geothermal power.
2016	Jonathan Ingram	Awarded "for his work developing the system that heralded the revolution in Building Information Modelling (BIM)." BIM is changing the way buildings and infrastructure are designed, constructed and managed all over the world.
2014	Ching-Chuen Chan	Awarded for his role in the development of electric vehicles as we know them today.
2012	Naeem Hussain	Awarded for his groundbreaking work on some of the world's most iconic bridges.
2010	John Davidson	Davidson has made major contributions to chemical engineering on a global scale, most notably in the area of research in multi-phase flow in fluidisation and bubble flow
2008	Ron Dennis	Recognising him for his leadership and entrepreneurial skills, for his contributions to the discipline of engineering, for contributions to the public perception of engineering, and for inspiring future young engineers
2007	medal not awarded	
2006	Olgierd Zienkiewicz	In recognition of outstanding contributions spanning the wide field of mechanics and engineering"
2005	James Dooge, FREng	Recognising "him as an outstanding figure in the field of hydrology"
2004	William Bonfield	In recognition for outstanding achievements in developing, commercialising, and expanding clinical use of "artificial bone" material and for his having helped to "define the field of biomaterials"
2003	David Rhodes	"In recognition for his outstanding research expertise in communications technology which he developed into a highly successful world-wide company"
2002	medal not awarded	
2001	Philip Ruffles	"In recognition of his exceptional contribution to engineering with Rolls-Royce, the aeroengine industry and the UK"
2000	Alec Broers	"In recognition of his achievements both as a pioneer in the world of miniature electronic circuits on silicon chips and also in building the university's links with industry so that Cambridge is now a major economic force"
1999	John Browne	"In recognition of his exceptional contribution to engineering in a distinguished career of over 30 years with BP, acknowledging both his early technological successes and latterly his outstanding management skills, culminating in the creation of Britain's biggest company through BP's £30.3 billion merger with Amoco"
1998	medal not awarded	
1997	John Argyris and Ray W. Clough	"In recognition of their outstanding contribution to engineering design through the formulation and development of the finite element method of analysis"
1996	Charles Kao	In recognition of "his pioneering work which led to the invention of optical fibre and for his leadership in its engineering and commercial realisation; and for his distinguished contribution to higher education in Hong Kong"
1995	medal not awarded	
1994	medal not awarded	
1993	medal not awarded	
1992	Denis Rooke	In recognition of "his inspired engineering leadership in the modernisation of the gas industry, the exploration, transportation and use of liquid natural gas and the conversion of the United Kingdom to its use"
1991	Frank Whittle	"In recognition of his vision, determination and engineering genius in developing the jet engine which had led to the transformation of air travel within his lifetime"

== Others ==
Another different medal also known as the Prince Philip medal is the City and Guilds Institute of London Gold Medal, awarded by the City & Guilds.

== See also ==
- List of engineering awards
