= Tsang Tak-sing =

Hong Kong politician (born 1949)

Tsang Tak-sing GBS, JP
- 曾德成
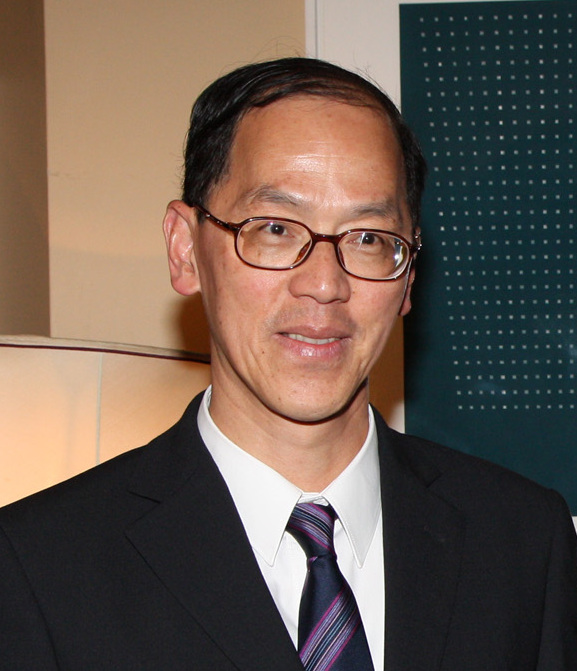

Secretary for Home Affairs
- In office 1 July 2007 – 21 July 2015
- Chief Executive: Sir Donald Tsang; Leung Chun-ying
- Chief Secretary: Henry Tang
- Undersecretary: Florence Hui
- Permanent Secretary: Raymond Young
- Political Assistant: Casper Tsui
- Preceded by: Patrick Ho
- Succeeded by: Lau Kong-wah

Personal details
- Born: 1949 (age 76–77) Canton, China
- Education: St Paul's College; University of Hong Kong (MIPA, M.A.); Harvard University (Nieman Fellow)

Tsang Tak-sing
- Traditional Chinese: 曾德成
Transcriptions
Standard Mandarin
- Hanyu Pinyin: Zēng Déchéng
Yue: Cantonese
- Yale Romanization: Jāng Dāk-sìhng
- Jyutping: Cang^{4} Dak^{1}sing^{4}

Tsang Tak Sing GBS JP (Chinese: 曾德成; born 1949, Canton, China) is the former Secretary for Home Affairs of Hong Kong. Formerly an adviser to the Central Policy Unit, he assumed office on 1 July 2007, replacing Patrick Ho. He is the younger brother of Jasper Tsang, who was the legislative councillor and former chairman of the Democratic Alliance for the Betterment of Hong Kong. Tsang is regarded as pro-Beijing with a long history of supporting the Chinese Communist Party.

== 1967 riot participant ==
Tsang is a leftist who participated in the Hong Kong 1967 Leftist Riots, when he was an Upper Form Six science student at St Paul's College.

An elite student in a prestigious school, Tsang had no ties with the leftist camp, but he was disgusted by what he considered the colonial government's oppression and viewed current society as decadent. He also branded the instruction at his school as simplistic, with many teachers not meeting the English level required for teaching. He drew up plans with a few classmates to support the leftist movement, and they distributed 375 leaflets in classrooms during lunchtime. However, Tsang, a school prefect at that time, was the only participant identified.

== Arrest ==
He was arrested on 28 September 1967 after distributing anti-government and Communism promotion leaflets, which condemned "the education system aiming at enslavement", "The Colonial Government prohibits us from becoming patriotic, by quelling with fascist forces", around the entrance of his school. He was reported by the schoolmaster R. G. Wells, arrested, tried and convicted on 9 October for two years for distributing inflammatory leaflets that promoted public order crime, thus depriving him of his chance of a university education due to his past criminal record. Tsang denied the charge and told the court that what he said in the leaflets was true and did not constitute sedition.

Tsang was interviewed by Andrew Li Kwok-nang while serving his term. Li was a student at Cambridge University, working as a summer intern at a magazine while doing a project on the worldwide student movements. Li was deeply impressed by Tsang, describing him as having "exceptional intellectual qualities" and remarking that he arrived at his conclusions through independent analysis, unlike most Hong Kong students.

== Career ==
A younger brother of Jasper Tsang, he joined the New Evening Post after his release from Stanley Prison in 1969. He became chief editor of Ta Kung Pao in 1988. He has been a Hong Kong deputy to the National People's Congress since the same year and was appointed an adviser to the Central Policy Unit in 1998. He obtained from the University of Hong Kong two master degrees: Master of International and Public Affairs and Master of Arts in Comparative Literature. He was a Nieman fellow at Harvard University from 1994 to 1995.

In December 2007 just days after Anson Chan's pro-democratic party victory in the 2007 Hong Kong island by-election, he accused her of being a "sudden democrat" who "suddenly cares about people's livelihood". He further commented "Our new legislator today is a former official ... [U]nless she believes that colonial rule was democracy, I don't know whether she has worked for people's livelihood or officials' livelihood."

On 30 March 2009 Tsang made a historic visit to Taipei. This is the first visit to the island by a senior Hong Kong official since the 1997 transfer of sovereignty.

== Sources ==
- "From jail to cabinet contender", South China Morning Post, 19 June 2007.

== See also ==
- Regina Ip
- Jasper Tsang
- Yeung Kwong

Political offices
Preceded by Patrick Ho	Secretary for Home Affairs; 2007–2015	Succeeded by Lau Kong-wah
Order of precedence
Previous: Frederick Ma; Recipients of the Gold Bauhinia Star	Hong Kong order of precedence Recipients of the Gold Bauhinia Star	Succeeded by Lee Kai-ming; Recipients of the Gold Bauhinia Star
