= Chiang Chen =

Hong Kong businessman (1923–2022)

The Honourable Chiang Chen GBM OBE
- 蔣震

Founder and Honorary Chairman of the Chen Hsong Holdings Limited
- In office 1958–2018
- Preceded by: Office established
- Succeeded by: Lai Yuen Chiang

Personal details
- Born: 29 August 1923 Heze, Shandong, China
- Died: 13 March 2022 (aged 98) Hong Kong, China
- Children: 7, including Ann Chiang

Chiang Chen
- Traditional Chinese: 蒋震
- Simplified Chinese: 蔣震
Transcriptions
Standard Mandarin
- Hanyu Pinyin: Jiǎng Zhèn
Yue: Cantonese
- Jyutping: Zoeng5 Zan3

Chiang Chen GBM OBE (Chinese: 蔣震, 29 August 1923 – 13 March 2022) was a Hong Kong industrialist.

== Biography ==
He was the founder and chairman of the Chen Hsong Holdings Limited since 1958. As a pro-Beijing entrepreneur, Chiang maintained good relations with the Chinese government, and was appointed a Hong Kong affair advisor. He was awarded the Grand Bauhinia Medal, the highest award under the Hong Kong honours and awards system on 1 July 2005 for his contributions in Hong Kong's industry. The Chiang Chen Studio Theatre in the Hong Kong Polytechnic University was also named after him.

He was the father of Hong Kong legislator Ann Chiang.

Chiang died on 13 March 2022, at the age of 98.

== Awards ==
- 1997: Appointed Officer of the Order of the British Empire (OBE) "for services to the modernisation of manufacturing industry in Hong Kong."
- 2003: The George Washington University President's Medal
- 2005: Grand Bauhinia Medal
