= Anthony Wu =

Standing committee member of the Chinese People's Political Consultative Conference

Anthony Wu Ting-yuk GBS JP
- 胡定旭
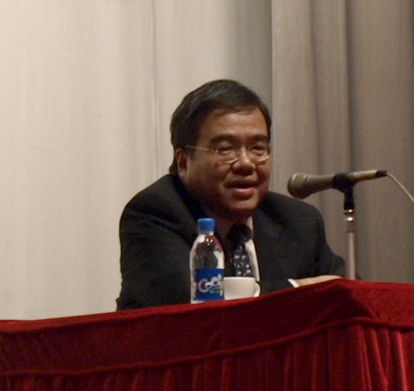

Member of the Standing Committee of the Chinese People's Political Consultative Conference
- Incumbent
- Assumed office 11 March 2013

Member of the CPPCC National Committee
- Incumbent
- Assumed office 3 March 1998

Chairman of the Hospital Authority
- In office 7 October 2004 – 1 December 2013
- Preceded by: Edward Leong
- Succeeded by: John Leong Chi-yan

Chairman of Hong Kong General Chamber of Commerce
- In office 31 May 2010 – 24 May 2012
- Preceded by: Andrew Brandler
- Succeeded by: Chow Chung-kong

Personal details
- Born: September 8, 1954 (age 72) British Hong Kong
- Education: St. Paul's Co-educational Primary School; Wah Yan College

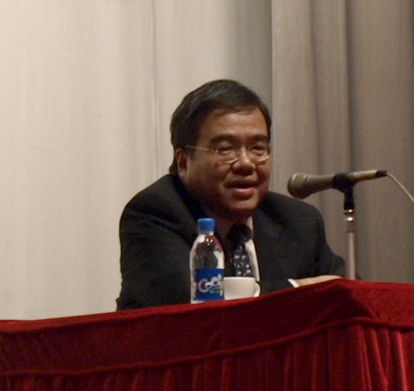
Anthony Wu

Antony Wu Ting-yuk, GBS, JP, (born 1954)(Chinese: 胡定旭; Sidney Lau: Woo^{4} Ding^{6} Yuk^{1}) is a standing committee member of the Chinese People's Political Consultative Conference (CPPCC) National Committee of the People's Republic of China. He was appointed on 11 March 2013.

== Early life ==
Wu received his secondary school education at Wah Yan College and went on to complete a foundation course in accountancy at the then Teesside Polytechnic, United Kingdom, in 1975. He then joined the Institute of Chartered Accountants (England & Wales) as a student member and obtained the Associate Chartered Accountant qualification in 1979.

== Accounting career ==
Wu was managing partner of Ernst & Young's China business in 1996. He became deputy chairman of the firm in 1998 and chairman in 2000. He left the firm in 2005.

== New China Hong Kong Group ==
Wu was appointed to the first board of directors of New China Hong Kong Group Limited in 1992, resigning in February 1993 to serve on its executive committee and act as financial advisor thereafter until its collapse in early 1999 with HK$1.5 billion in unpaid creditors. At the same time as being vice-chairman of Ernst & Young, the company's auditor, Wu, in addition to being a member of the company's executive committee, was an authorised signatory to 13 of its bank accounts, had significant personal dealings with its subsidiaries and lent money to it.

== Public appointments and politics ==
From 1997 to 2001, Wu was a member of the Hospital Governing Committee of the Pamela Youde Nethersole Eastern Hospital, Hong Kong.

After three years (1999–2002) as a member of the Hospital Authority of Hong Kong's audit committee and four years as chairman of its Finance and Tender committees (2000–2004), Wu was appointed chairman of the authority on 7 October 2004, a post he held for the following nine years.

In 2004, Wu was a member of the Disciplinary Panel of the Hong Kong Society of Accountants and a member of the Municipal Services Appeals Board of Hong Kong.

In 2006, he co-founded the high-profile pro-Beijing political thinktank in Hong Kong, the Bauhinia Foundation Research Centre.

On 10 December 2006, Wu was appointed to the small-circle Hong Kong Election Committee in the CPPCC sub-sector by dint of his membership of that organ. He had been a member of the National Committee of the CPPCC since as early as 2004.

In 2010, Wu was elected chairman of the Hong Kong General Chamber of Commerce, having been vice-chairman for at least six years, and served a two-year term of office.

In February 2022, Wu had no comment when SCMP asked if he would be attending the 2022 Two Sessions, as a Hong Kong delegate.

== Business activities ==
In 2016, Wu was Deputy Chairman of listed Sincere Watch (Hong Kong) Ltd and independent non-executive director of three other Hong Kong listed firms: Li Ka-shing controlled Power Assets Holdings Limited, PRC government investment arm Guangdong Investment Limited and PRC government controlled China Taiping Insurance Holdings.

== Honours ==
The Hong Kong Government awarded Wu the Gold Bauhinia Star (GBS), its highest honour, for distinguished service to the community in 2008, one of eight recipients that year.

== Professional misconduct ==
In 2014, Wu was found guilty of professional misconduct by the Hong Kong Institute of Certified Public Accountants for acting concurrently both as financial advisor to and auditor of New China Hong Kong Group prior to its collapse in 1999. He was struck off for two years and fined HK$250,000 plus the institute's costs. The institute, exceptionally, issued a statement in July 2014 in response to unrepentant remarks by Wu, in which it stated that his breaches had been "persistent, flagrant and inexcusable".
