= Chung Shui-ming =

Hong Kong businessman and politician

Dr. Timpson Chung Shui-ming GBS, JP (鍾瑞明, born 23 November 1952) is a Hong Kong businessman and politician.

== Background and education ==
Timpson Chung Shui-ming is of Hakka ancestry. He studied at the University of Hong Kong and graduated with a Bachelor of Science degree. He later obtained a master's degree in Business Administration from the Chinese University of Hong Kong and received an honorary doctoral degree in Social Science from the City University of Hong Kong in 2010.

He currently holds the position of the independent non-executive director of the China Construction Bank Corporation, China Everbright Limited, China Unicom (Hong Kong) Limited, Glorious Sun Enterprises, Henderson Land Development and Miramar Hotel and Investment.

He has also held numerous public office positions including chairman of the Hong Kong Housing Society and the Advisory Committee on Art Developments, chairman of the Council of the City University of Hong Kong, vice-chairman of the Land Fund Advisory Committee, member of the Managing Board of the Kowloon-Canton Railway Corporation, a member of the Hong Kong Housing Authority, and a member of the Disaster Relief Fund Advisory Committee.

He was also member of the first Executive Council of Hong Kong since the transfer of sovereignty over Hong Kong on 1 July 1997, appointed by the then Chief Executive Tung Chee-hwa. He was the member of the Election Committee between 2000 and 2006 and again from 2011, which was responsible for electing the Chief Executive. Besides he is also member of the National Committee of the 11th Chinese People's Political Consultative Conference.

He was a director-general of the Democratic Alliance for the Betterment and Progress of Hong Kong, the largest pro-Beijing party in the SAR.

Dr. Chung is a fellow member of the Hong Kong Institute of Certified Public Accountants.

In 2000, Dr. Chung received the Gold Bauhinia Star for his public services in Hong Kong.
