= Philip Ruffles =

British aerospace engineer

Philip Charles Ruffles CBE FREng FRS (born 14 October 1939) is a British aerospace engineer.

== Early life ==
Ruffles was born in Westerham, Kent. Ruffles attended Sevenoaks School. He graduated from the University of Bristol with a first class Bachelor of Science (BSc) in mechanical engineering in 1961.

== Career ==
Ruffles joined Rolls-Royce plc, becoming director of engineering and technology from 1997 until his retirement in 2001. He is an advisor to Bladon Jets. He was a non-executive director of Domino Printing Sciences plc.

== Honours and awards ==
- 1998 Fellow of the Royal Society
- 2001 Commander of the Most Excellent Order of the British Empire
- 2001 Prince Philip Medal
- 2011 Richard Glazebrook Medal and Prize of the Institute of Physics
- Royal Aeronautical Society Gold Medal
- Fellow of the Royal Academy of Engineering
- MacRobert Award of the Royal Academy of Engineering
