= Philip Chan (scientist) =

Philip C. H. Chan
- 陳正豪

Interim President of The Hong Kong Polytechnic University
- In office 1 January 2019 – 30 June 2019
- Chancellor: Carrie Lam
- Deputy: Himself
- Preceded by: Timothy Tong
- Succeeded by: Teng Jin-guang

Deputy President and Provost of The Hong Kong Polytechnic University
- In office 1 March 2010 – 29 February 2020
- President: Timothy Tong; Himself (Interim)
- Chancellor: Leung Chun-ying; Carrie Lam
- Preceded by: Alexander Tzang Hing-chung
- Succeeded by: Alexander Wai

Personal details
- Born: Shanghai
- Education: University of California, Davis (BSc); University of Illinois at Urbana–Champaign (MSc, PhD)
- Profession: Electronics

Philip C. H. Chan was the Deputy President and Provost of the Hong Kong Polytechnic University (HKPU), who is currently Emeritus Professor of Electrical and Electronic Engineering.

Before joining PolyU on 1 March 2010 he had been Chair Professor of the Department of Electronic and Computer Engineering at the Hong Kong University of Science and Technology since 1991, the year he entered the university as a founding member.

After Professor Timonthy Tong finished his term as HKPU President, he was appointed as interim President from 1 January 2019 to 30 June 2019. On 1 July, Professor Jin-Guang Teng assumed his post as President. Professor Chan continues to serve as Provost and Deputy President until 29 February 2020, and retired from HKPU.

Chan was born in Shanghai and then raised in Hong Kong.

Academic offices
Preceded by Timothy W. Tong	President of the Hong Kong Polytechnic University; 2019 (Interim)	Succeeded by Teng Jin-guang
