= Chow Yei-ching =

Hong Kong businessman

Chow Yei-ching GBS OBE
- Born: 1 September 1935; Ningbo, China
- Died: 29 July 2018 (aged 82)
- Occupations: Businessman, philanthropist

Chow Yei-ching, GBS OBE (Chinese: 周亦卿; 1 September 1935 – 29 July 2018) was a Hong Kong businessman who was the chairman, managing director and chairman emeritus of Chevalier International Holdings, an international conglomerate, comprising property and hotel management, engineering, construction, insurance, investments, information technology, food/beverage, and car dealership businesses. The Group holds two publicly listed companies in Hong Kong – Chevalier International Holdings, Ltd. and Chevalier Pacific Holdings, Ltd. and one publicly listed company in Singapore – Chevalier Singapore Holdings, Ltd.

== Political career ==
In 2001, Chow was appointed Honorary Consul of the Kingdom of Bahrain in Hong Kong.

== Affiliations ==
- President, Japan Society of Hong Kong
- President, Ning Po Residents Association, Ltd.
- Permanent Honorary President of the Hong Kong Alumni Association of National Taiwan University

== Personal life ==
Chow was born in Ningbo. His widow, Miyakawa Michiko, is of Japanese descent, and they had seven children. His son-in-law is Cantonese actor Carlo Ng. They lived in Hong Kong, near the main headquarters of Chevalier International Holdings. He died aged 82 on 29 July 2018, three years after learning he had liver cancer.

== Public service ==
- Vice patron of The Community Chest of Hong Kong (2001)
- Founding President of the International Ningbo Merchants Association Co Ltd.
- President of The Japan Society of Hong Kong
- Permanent Honorary President of the National Taiwan University Hong Kong Alumni Association
- Consultative Professor of Zhejiang University
- Lecture Professor of Sichuan University

Chow donated money to multiple universities in Hong Kong and China to raise public awareness of education. These include City University of Hong Kong, The University of Hong Kong, and Hong Kong Polytechnic University.

== Awards and honours ==
- Honorable Decorations from United Kingdom, Belgium, France, Japan
- Doctor of Social Science honoris causa, The Hong Kong University of Science and Technology (2013)
- Order of the Rising Sun, Gold Rays with Neck Ribbon (Japan/2008)
- Honorary Degree of Doctor of Social Science, The City University of Hong Kong (2008)
- Gold Bauhinia Star (Hong Kong/2004)
- Order of the Sacred Treasure, Gold Rays with Rosette (Japan/1998)
- Honorary Degree of Doctor of Laws, The University of Hong Kong (1997)
- Honorary University Fellow, The University of Hong Kong (1997)
- Officier de l'Ordre National du Mérite (France/1996)
- Honorary Degree of Doctor of Business Administration, The Hong Kong Polytechnic University (1995)
- Officer in the Order of the Crown (Belgium/1993)
