= Chan Sui-kau =

Chinese businessman

The Honourable Chan Sui-kau GBM, GBS, OBE, JP
- 陳瑞球

Chairman of YGM Group
- In office 1949–2018
- Preceded by: Office established

Personal details
- Born: 22 October 1926 Dongguan, Guangdong, Republic of China
- Died: 27 March 2018 (aged 91) Hong Kong

Chan Sui-kau
- Traditional Chinese: 陈瑞球
- Simplified Chinese: 陳瑞球
Transcriptions

Chan Sui-kau, GBM, GBS, OBE, JP (Chinese: 陳瑞球; 22 October 1926 in Dongguan, Guangdong – 27 March 2018) was a Hong Kong industrialist and philanthropist who is the founder of Yangtzekiang Garment Limited and the YGM Group. Due to his contributions on Hong Kong's garment and textile industry, he is nicknamed the "King of Hong Kong's Garment Industry" (Chinese: 香港紡織大王) by the media. Besides serving in the garment industry, Chan, as pro-Beijing entrepreneur, maintained good relations with the Chinese government, and was appointed as a National Committee Member of the Chinese People's Political Consultative Conference representing Hong Kong, serving in that post from 1993 to 2003.

Chan held Honorary Doctorates from the Hong Kong Polytechnic University and the City University of Hong Kong. The Chan Sui Kau and Chan Lam Moon Chun Hall in the Hong Kong University of Science and Technology and a sports rehabilitation centre in the Hong Kong Polytechnic University is named after him. Chan was awarded the Grand Bauhinia Medal, the highest award under the Hong Kong honours and awards system on 1 July 2008.

== Awards ==
- 1983: Justice of the Peace
- 1988: OBE
- 2002: Gold Bauhinia Star
- 2008: Grand Bauhinia Medal
