= Charles Yeung =

Hong Kong politician (born 1947)

The Honourable Charles Yeung 楊釗 GBM GBS JP

Member of the Provisional Legislative Council
- In office 21 December 1996 – 30 June 1998

Personal details
- Born: February 1947 (age 79) Huiyang, Huizhou, Guangdong, China
- Party: HKPA (until 2005); DAB (2005-)
- Education: China Textile University
- Occupation: Entrepreneur

Charles Yeung Chun-kam GBM GBS JP (born February 1947 in Huiyang, Huizhou, China) is a Hong Kong entrepreneur and politician. A Hakka, Yeung was a member of the Provisional Legislative Council which existed from 1996 to 1998 and councillor and the member of the Chinese People's Political Consultative Conference National Committee. He was the advisory professor of the China Textile University, director of the Seng Heng Bank and adviser of the One Country Two Systems Research Institute.

Yeung is the founder and chairman of Glorious Sun Enterprises Limited (SEHK: 393), a company listed on the Hong Kong Stock Exchange.

Yeung is the real estate developer of One Peking, a landmark skyscraper located at the cross-section of Peking Road and Canton Road in Tsim Sha Tsui, Kowloon, Hong Kong, across the street from Harbour City. Yeung acquired the site from the Hong Kong Government in auction in 1998 for HK$1.24 billion and invested more than $2 billion in developing the site.

Yeung is chairman of the Chinese General Chamber of Commerce.

Legislative Council of Hong Kong
New parliament	Member of Provisional Legislative Council; 1997–1998	Replaced by Legislative Council
