= Asad M. Madni =

Indian American engineering professor

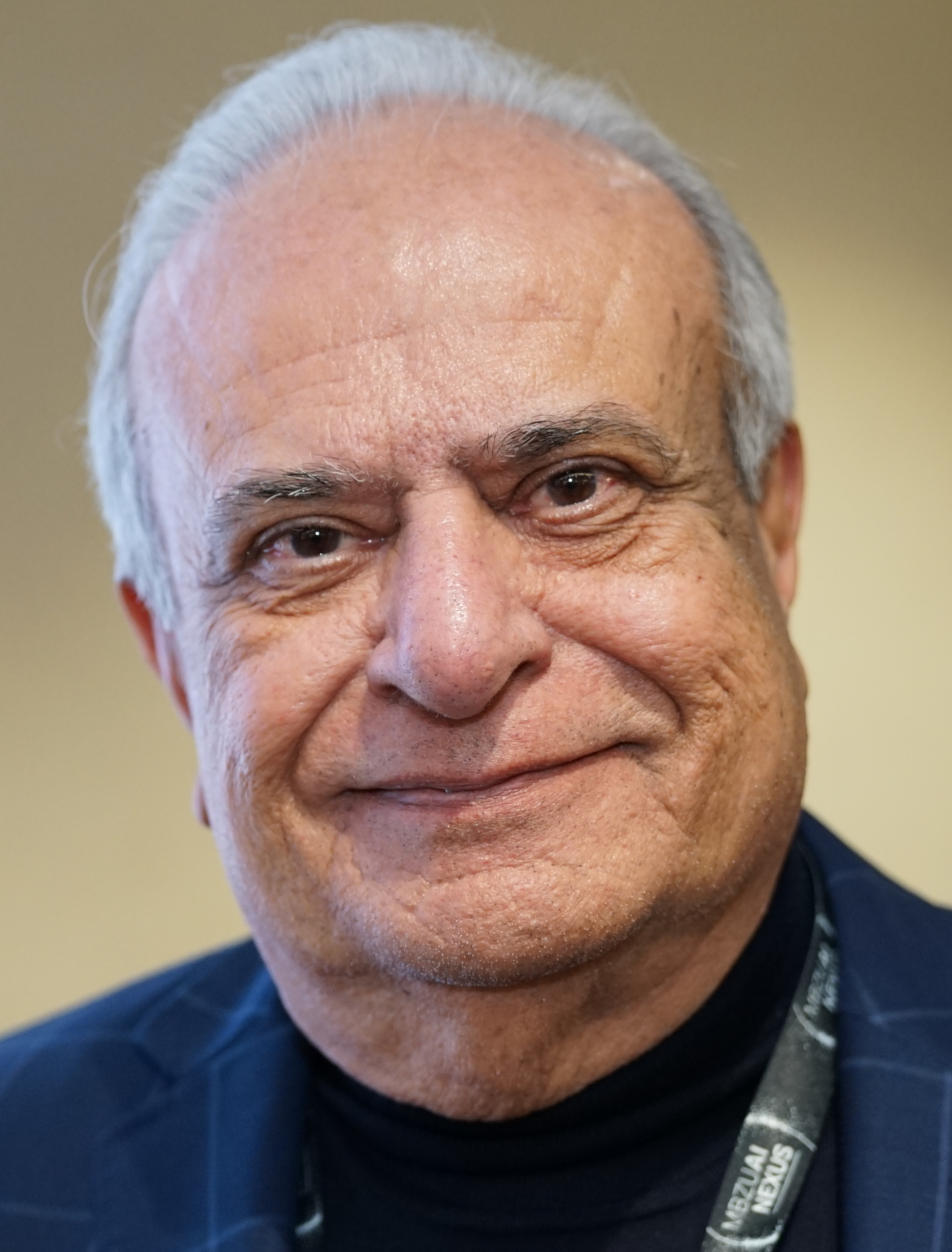
Madni in 2026

Asad M. Madni is an adjunct professor of electrical and computer engineering at UCLA Henry Samueli School of Engineering and Applied Science. He was bestowed the IEEE Medal of Honor in 2022, the Prince Philip Medal of the Royal Academy of Engineering also in 2022 and the John Fritz Medal in 2024. He was elected a Fellow of the International Core Academy of Sciences and Humanities and an Honorary Fellow of the Royal Society of Edinburgh in 2025.
