= Tai Tak-fung =

Stephen Tai Tak-fung GBM, GBS, JP (Chinese: 戴德豐; born 1948) is the founder and chairman of the Four Seas Group and the member of the Standing Committee of both the National and the Guangdong Provincial Committee of the Chinese People's Political Consultative Conference (CPPCC).

== Career ==
He founded the Four Seas Group in 1971, a conglomerate specialising in raw material supply, food manufacturing, food trading and distribution, as well as cafes, chain restaurants and investment holdings business. He has also been Executive Director of Hong Kong Food Investment Holdings Limited since May 1997.

Tai holds several public positions, including the President of Hong Kong Foodstuffs Association Limited, the President of Hong Kong Japan Confectionery, Biscuit & Foodstuff Association, the Consultant of China National Food Industry Association.

He is currently a Member of the Chinese People’s Political Consultative Conference, a Member of the Chinese People’s Political Consultative Conference Canton Standing Committee and the International Economic Adviser of the People’s Government of Hebei Province. He is a Member of the Greater Pearl River Delta Business Council and the Trade and Industry Advisory Board of HKSAR. He has been awarded the Grand Bauhinia Medal, Gold Bauhinia Star, Silver Bauhinia Star and Justice of the Peace.

== Education ==
He holds Honorary Professor of Canadian Chartered Institute of Business Administration in Canada, the Visiting Professor of South China Normal University, Honorary Doctorate of Philosophy of Morrison University in the United States and Doctor of Philosophy in Business Administration (honoris causa) of Southern California University for Professional Studies in the United States.

== Awards and honours ==
He received a number of awards and accolades, including the World Outstanding Chinese Award, the 30th Food Industry Distinguished Service Award, Letter of Appreciation from the Food & Marketing Bureau of the Ministry of Agriculture, Forestry and Fishery of Japan, the Outstanding Contribution Award of China National Food Industry, the Top 10 Outstanding People of Asia Management Innovation Award, the Top 10 Famous People of China Innovative Branding Award, “Honourable Citizen of Shantou” and “Honourable Citizen of Guangzhou” in Mainland China.
