= Hu Fa-kuang =

Hong Kong politician (1924–2022)

- Born: 14 February 1924; Shanghai, China
- Died: 4 June 2022 (aged 98)
- Education: B.S. Mechanical Engineering from the Chiao Tung University
- Occupations: Businessman and politician
- Title: Director and Managing Director of Ryoden (Holdings)
- Spouse: Rose Young Sai-cheung
- Children: 2

Hu Fa-kuang GBM CBE JP (Chinese: 胡法光, 14 February 1924 – 4 June 2022) was a Hong Kong businessman and politician. He was the unofficial member of the Legislative Council of Hong Kong and was chairman of the Liberal Democratic Federation of Hong Kong, a conservative pro-business party in the early 1990s.

== Biography ==
Hu was born in Shanghai, China on 14 February 1924. He obtained a Bachelor of Science degree in Mechanical Engineering from the Chiao Tung University and later moved to Hong Kong in 1952. He became the director and managing director of Ryoden (Holdings) Ltd and other companies.

He was appointed to various public positions, including chairman of the Transport Tribunal, the Financial Committee of the Hong Kong Housing Authority and the Council for Recreation and Sport and a promoter of sport activities. He was also member of the Transport Advisory Committee. He was also member of the Urban Council and the Wan Chai District Board.

Hu was first appointed unofficial member of the Legislative Council of Hong Kong in 1979. He went on to serve in the council until 1991. In 1990, Hu became the founding chairman of the Liberal Democratic Federation of Hong Kong (LDF) which consisted of businesspeople to contest against the liberal United Democrats of Hong Kong in the 1991 first direction election. The Federation won three seats in the end and was defeated by pro-democracy camp. The LDF quickly went into decline as the pro-business Liberal Party and pro-Beijing Democratic Alliance for the Betterment of Hong Kong (DAB) were formed in the early 1990s. In 1997, LDF was merged into another pro-business party Hong Kong Progressive Alliance.

During the 1990s, Hu took part in negotiation and preparatory works for the establishment of the Hong Kong Special Administrative Region. He was a member of the Preparatory Committee for the HKSAR and a delegate to the Chinese People's Political Consultative Conference.

Hu married Rose Young Sai-cheung and had two sons. One of his sons, Herman Hu, was also a businessman and politician. Hu Fa-kuang died on 4 June 2022, at the age of 98.
