= China Top Brand =

Chinese mark for well recognized brands

The China Top Brand mark

China Top Brand (Chinese: 中国名牌; pinyin: Zhongguo Mingpai) was a Chinese mark for well recognized brands. It was created in 2001 to promote strong Chinese brand names. In 2010 the General Administration of Quality Supervision, Inspection and Quarantine (AQSIQ) announced that the mark was being phased out.
