= Jose Yu =

Hong Kong pro-Beijing businessman, chairman of the HKI Group

The Honourable Jose Yu Sunsay GBM, GBS, SBS, JP
- 楊孫西

Chair of the HKI Group
- Incumbent
- Assumed office 1969
- Preceded by: Office established

Personal details
- Born: November 1938 (age 87) Shishi, Fujian, Republic of China
- Party: Democratic Alliance for the Betterment and Progress of Hong Kong (DAB)

Jose Yu
- Traditional Chinese: 杨孙西
- Simplified Chinese: 楊孫西
Transcriptions

Jose Yu Sunsay, GBM, GBS, SBS, JP (Chinese: 楊孫西, born November 1938 in Shishi, Fujian) is a Hong Kong pro-Beijing businessman who is the Chairman of the HKI Group. As a member of the pro-Beijing camp, Yu maintained good relations with the Chinese government, and was appointed as a Hong Kong affair advisor in 1993, and a National committee member of the Chinese People's Political Consultative Conference representing Hong Kong, serving in that post from 2003 to 2013. Ho was awarded the Grand Bauhinia Medal, the highest award under the Hong Kong honours and awards system by Chief Executive CY Leung on 1 July 2014.

== Awards ==
- 1998: Justice of the Peace
- 1999: Silver Bauhinia Star
- 2007: Gold Bauhinia Star
- 2014: Grand Bauhinia Medal
