= Wu Chung-yi =

Taiwanese billionaire

Wu "Tony" Chung-yi (Chinese: 吳崇儀) is a Taiwanese billionaire who is the chairman of auto parts firm Fine Blanking. A large portion of his wealth comes from his sale of his former stake in Master Kong. He resides in Taichung, and graduated from the University of California, Los Angeles.

In 2011, Wu was ranked #37 on the Forbes' list of richest Taiwanese people. By 2020, his rank had fallen to #41.
