= Teng Jin-guang =

Chinese structural engineer

- 滕锦光
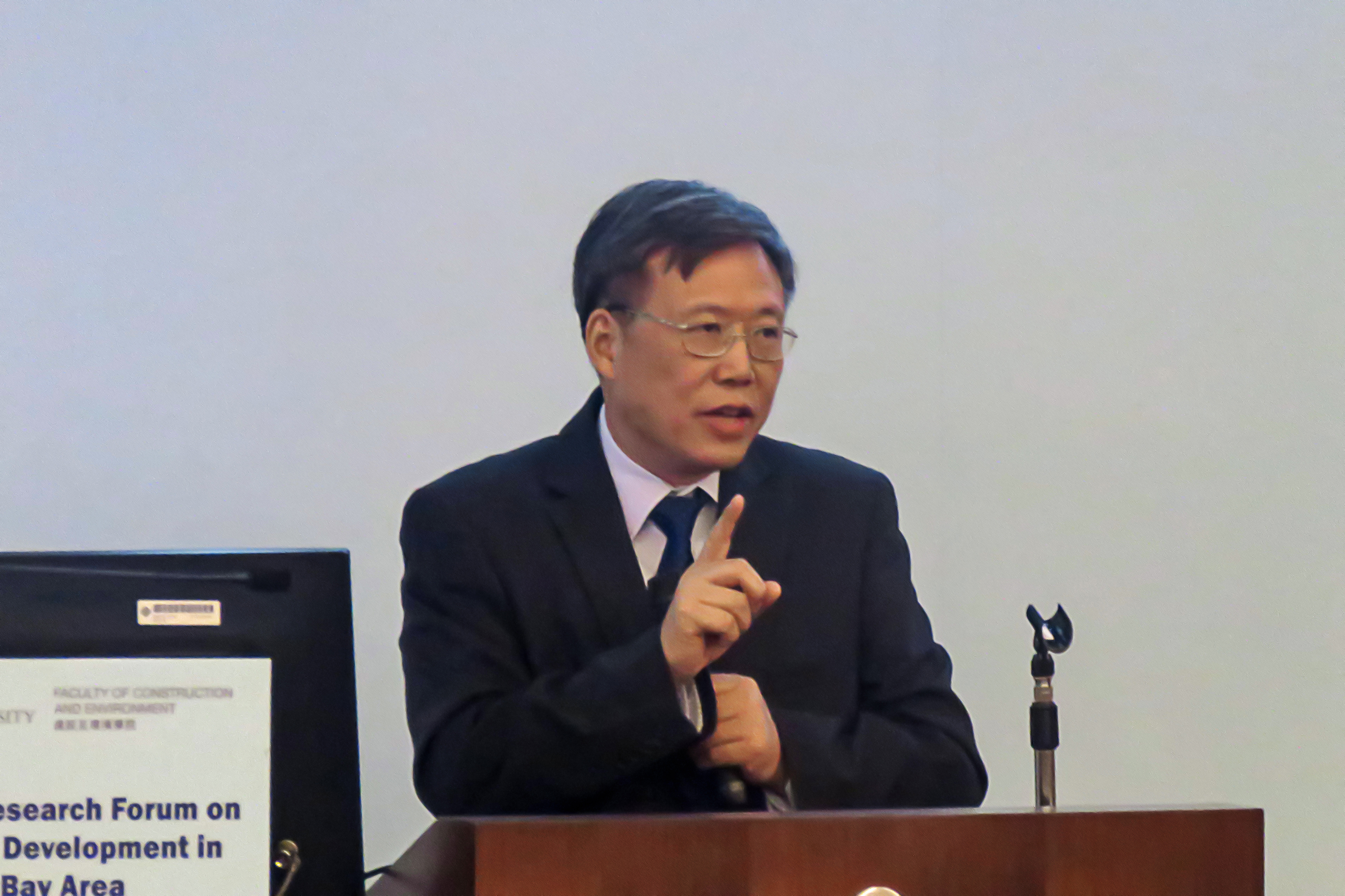
- Teng Jinguang at FCE Translational Research Forum in April 2019.

President of Hong Kong Polytechnic University
- Incumbent
- Assumed office 1 July 2019
- Preceded by: Philip Chan (acting)

Vice-President of Southern University of Science and Technology
- In office April 2018 – August 2019
- Preceded by: Tang Tao
- Succeeded by: Vacant

Personal details
- Born: March 1964 (age 62) Yongjia County, Zhejiang, China
- Education: Zhejiang University (BEng); University of Sydney (PhD)
- Profession: Structural engineering

Chinese name
- Traditional Chinese: 滕錦光
- Simplified Chinese: 滕锦光
Transcriptions
Standard Mandarin
- Hanyu Pinyin: Téng Jǐnguāng
Yue: Cantonese
- Jyutping: tang^{4} gam^{2}gwong^{1}

Teng Jin-guang (Chinese: 滕锦光; born March 1964) is a Chinese engineer and educator, currently serving as the president of the Hong Kong Polytechnic University since 1 July 2019. Previously he served as the vice-president of Southern University of Science and Technology.

== Early life and education ==
Teng was born in Yongjia County, Zhejiang in March 1964. He secondary studied at Laowu High School (now Luofu High School). In 1979 he entered Zhejiang University, where he graduated in 1983. In 1985 he was sent to the University of Sydney to study at the expense of the government. He did post-doctoral research at the University of Edinburgh under the supervision of John Michael Rotter.

== Career ==
In April 1991 he became an instructor at James Cook University. He joined the Department of Civil and Structural Engineering faculty of Hong Kong Polytechnic University in October 1994, becoming associate professor in 1997 and dean and full professor in 1999. In September 2006 he was promoted to become vice-president, a position he held until June 2010. He was dean of the School of Construction and Environment in September 2007, and held that office until June 2013. In April 2018 he became vice-president of Southern University of Science and Technology and dean of its Graduate School.

On 26 March 2019, he was hired as President of Hong Kong Polytechnic University. He officially served as president of PolyU since 1 July 2019. In October 2019, he was criticised for refusing to shake hands with graduates wearing masks in a graduation ceremony.

== Honours and awards ==
- 2015 Fellow of the Royal Society of Edinburgh (RSE)
- November 2017 Member of the Chinese Academy of Sciences (CAS)

Educational offices
Preceded by Andrew Noel Baldwin	Dean of the School of Construction and Environment, Hong Kong Polytechnic University; 2007–2013	Succeeded by Chen Bingquan
Preceded by Tang Tao	Vice-President of Southern University of Science and Technology; 2018–2019	Succeeded by Vacant
Preceded by Philip Chan (acting)	President of Hong Kong Polytechnic University; 2019	Incumbent
