= Ng Hong-mun =

Chinese politician (1926–2026)

The Honourable Ng Hong-mun GBM
- 吳康民

Member of the 9th and 10th National People's Congress
- In office March 2, 1998 – March 2, 2008
- Constituency: Hong Kong

Member of the 4th, 5th, 6th, 7th and 8th National People's Congress
- In office January 3, 1975 – March 2, 1998
- Constituency: Guangdong

Personal details
- Born: 9 April 1926 Hweilai, Guangdong, China
- Died: 18 October 2026 (aged 100)

Ng Hong-mun
- Traditional Chinese: 吴康民
- Simplified Chinese: 吳康民
Transcriptions

Ng Hong-mun GBM (Chinese: 吳康民, 9 April 1926 – 18 October 2026) was a Chinese politician who served as a member of the 4th, 5th, 6th, 7th and 8th National People's Congress representing Guangdong, from 1975 to 1998. Ng then served as a member of the 9th and 10th National People's Congress representing Hong Kong, from 1998 to 2008. He was the longest serving member of the National People's Congress from Hong Kong, serving as member for over 32 years. In addition, Ng was also appointed a Hong Kong affair advisor in 1992 and a member of the Preliminary Working Committee in 1993.

Ng was awarded the Grand Bauhinia Medal, the highest award under the Hong Kong honours and awards system by Chief Executive CH Tung on 1 July 1998. He worked as a columnist for Ming Pao. Ng turned 100 years old in 2026, and a banquet was held in his honor by the Hong Kong Chiu Chow Chamber of Commerce. He died on 18 October 2026, at the age of 100.

== Awards ==
- 1998: Grand Bauhinia Medal

== Controversial Remarks ==
=== Criticizing the Pro-Democracy Camp ===
On 8 March 2014, Ng, as a columnist for Ming Pao, commented that the recent political chaos in Hong Kong has reached a "critical point" (Chinese: 臨界點). He denounced the Occupy Central with Love and Peace movement launched by members of the pro-democracy camp, warning that further moves against the People's Republic of China Government by the general public will result in a "total disaster" for Hong Kong, causing Hong Kong to be totally ungovernable.
