= Andrew Brandler =

Hong Kong businessman

- Born: April 19, 1956 (age 69)
- Occupation: CEO of CLP Group (2000–2013)

Andrew Clifford Winawer Brandler is a British businessman who served as the Chief Executive Officer of Hong Kong utility company CLP Group from 2000 to 2013, and Chairman of Hong Kong General Chamber of Commerce from 2008 to 2010.

== Biography ==
=== Professional career ===
Brandler holds an MA degree from the University of Cambridge and an MBA degree from Harvard Business School. He is a qualified Chartered Accountant.

His background is in Investment banking, having served as Head of Asia-Pacific Corporate Finance of Schroders, in Hong Kong prior to his appointment as Chief Executive Officer of Hong Kong listed utility company CLP Group in 2000. He was CEO of CLP Group from 2000 to 2013.

In May 2008, following the fraud investigation into Lily Chiang, Brandler was elected to replace Chiang as Chairman of the Hong Kong General Chamber of Commerce. He was Chairman of the Chamber from 2008 to 2010.

=== Community positions ===
- Chairman of the Hong Kong General Chamber of Commerce (2008–2010)
- Council Member of the Hong Kong Trade Development Council
- Council Member of the Hong Kong Management Association
- Member of the Operations Review Committee of the Independent Commission Against Corruption
