= Poon Chung-kwong =

Hong Kong chemist, academic, and former president of Polytechnic University

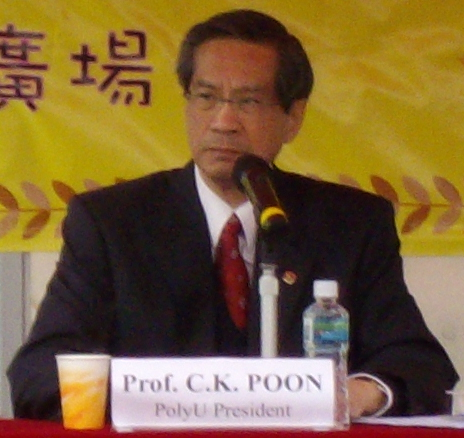
Chung-Kwong Poon at a meeting with HKPU students

Professor Poon Chung-kwong, GBS, OBE, JP (Chinese: 潘宗光, born 1940, Hong Kong) was the President of the Hong Kong Polytechnic University from 1991 to 2008.

He received his secondary education at St. Paul's Co-educational College. Trained as a chemist, he holds doctorates of science and of philosophy from the University College London. He has been a visiting scholar at University of Southern California and at California Institute of Technology. In addition to being the chief administrator of Hong Kong's largest scientific/technical university he is also a member of the National Committee of the Chinese People's Political Consultative Conference.

His late cousin was the singer Leslie Cheung.

== See also ==
- Education in Hong Kong

Academic offices
Unknown	President of the Hong Kong Polytechnic University; 1991–2008	Succeeded by Timothy W. Tong
Order of precedence
Preceded by Chang Hsin-kang; Recipients of the Gold Bauhinia Star	Hong Kong order of precedence Recipients of the Gold Bauhinia Star	Succeeded by Timothy Fok; Recipients of the Gold Bauhinia Star
