= Timothy W. Tong =

Timothy Tong Wai-cheung
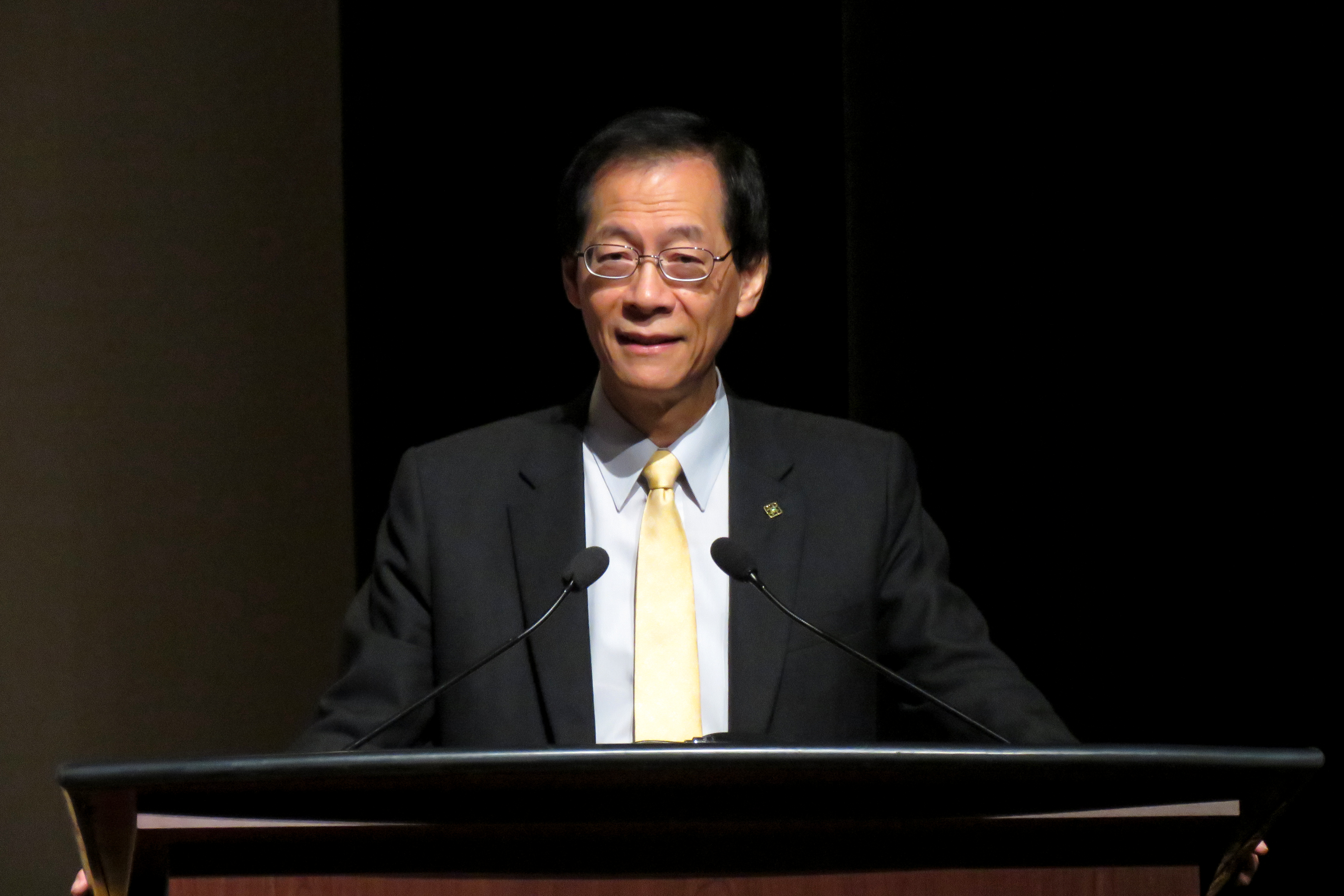
- Timothy W. Tong in August 2018

President of the Hong Kong Polytechnic University
- In office 1 January 2009 – 1 January 2019
- Chancellor: Sir Donald Tsang; Leung Chun-ying; Carrie Lam
- Preceded by: Poon Chung-kwong
- Succeeded by: Philip C. H. Chan (Interim)

Personal details
- Born: 1953 (age 71–72); Hong Kong

Timothy Tong Wai-cheung
- Traditional Chinese: 唐偉章
- Simplified Chinese: 唐伟章
Transcriptions
Standard Mandarin
- Hanyu Pinyin: Táng Wěizhāng
Yue: Cantonese
- Jyutping: Tong4 Wai5 Zoeng1

Timothy W. Tong (Chinese: 唐偉章) (born 1953 in Hong Kong) is a former president of the Hong Kong Polytechnic University. He became President on 1 January 2009, succeeding Poon Chung Kwong. After stepping down, his post was taken over by Philip C. H. Chan as interim President. Prior to obtaining the presidency, Tong was Dean of School of Engineering and Applied Science (SEAS) at George Washington University in the United States.

Tong received his secondary education at Hong Kong Christian College in Hong Kong. He pursued tertiary education in the United States where he received his Bachelor of Science degree in Mechanical Engineering from Oregon State University in 1976 and Master of Science and Doctor of Philosophy in the same discipline from the University of California at Berkeley in 1978 and 1980 respectively.

Tong is famous for his academic achievements in the field of mechanical engineering. He has authored seven books and conference proceedings and published more than 80 technical articles in international journals.

Academic offices
Preceded by Poon Chung-kwong	President of the Hong Kong Polytechnic University; 2009–2018	Succeeded by Philip C. H. Chan (Interim)
