= Tam Sheung-wai =

Hong Kong academic (1934–2021)

- Traditional Chinese: 譚尚渭
- Simplified Chinese: 谭尚渭
Transcriptions
Yue: Cantonese
- Yale Romanization: Tàahm Seuhng waih
- Jyutping: Taam^{4} Soeng^{6} wai^{6}

Tam Sheung-wai (1934 – 1 January 2021) OBE, GBS, JP (Chinese: 譚尚渭) was the President Emeritus of The Open University of Hong Kong. He is widely recognised for his many contributions towards the development of distance education in Hong Kong. He was also the Chairman of the College Council of St. Paul's Co-educational College.

== Early life ==
Tam received bachelor's and master's degrees in science from the University of Hong Kong. In 1964, he obtained a PhD in chemistry from the University of Nottingham.

== Career ==
Tam joined Chung Chi College, part of the Chinese University of Hong Kong (CUHK), as a chemistry lecturer in 1965.

He served as head of the Chinese University's graduate school from 1981 until 1993, and as a pro-vice-chancellor of the university from 1990 to 1994. Tam retired from CUHK in 1995, the same year he was appointed president of OUHK. Tam retired from the presidency in November 2003.

== See also ==
- Education in Hong Kong
