= Lubov Azria =

Ukrainian-born American fashion designer

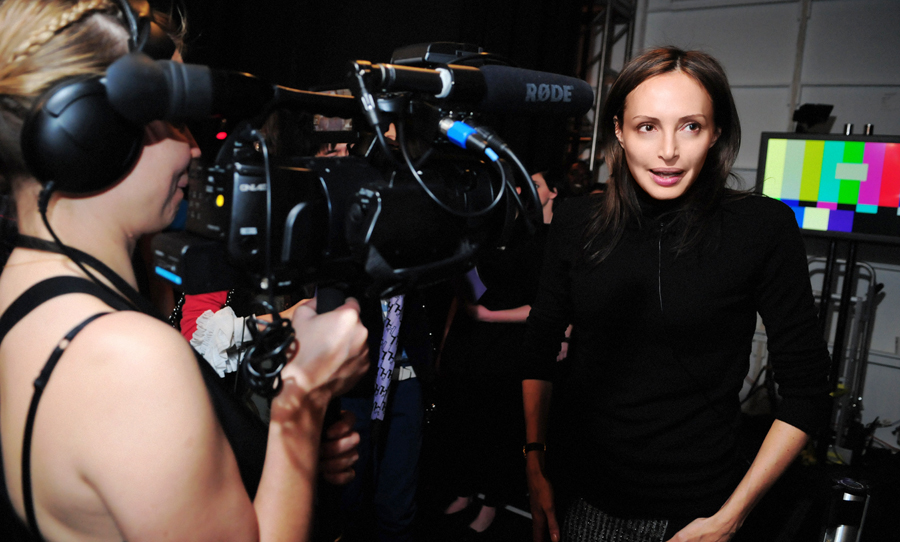
- Azria in 2009
- Born: November 8, 1967 (age 58); Kiev, Ukraine
- Education: FIDM, California
- Labels: BCBG Max Azria; BCBG Max Azria Runway; Hervé Léger by Max Azria; Max Azria; La Boheme
- Spouse: Max Azria (m. 1992; died 2019)
- Children: 3

Lubov Azria (born November 8, 1967) is a Ukrainian-born American fashion designer. She was the Chief Creative Officer of BCBGMAXAZRIA Group, a global fashion house with over 20 brands.

== Biography ==
Lubov Azria was born on November 8, 1967, in Kyiv, Soviet Ukraine. Growing up as an only child, Azria studied ballet from an early age and eventually trained with the renowned Bolshoi Ballet youth division.

In 1980, her parents relocated to San Antonio, Texas, United States, where Azria further explored her passion for the arts and attended Robert E. Lee High School. In 1986, Azria moved to Los Angeles, California, where she obtained a degree from the Fashion Institute of Design & Merchandising.

== Career ==
Azria joined BCBG Max Azria Group in 1991 after a mutual friend referred her to the company's founder, and her future husband, Max Azria. As chief creative officer, Azria led the company's design team and oversaw marketing and merchandising for the group's more than 20 labels, which included the core brand BCBG Max Azria and the high fashion labels BCBG Max Azria Runway, Hervé Léger and Max Azria. Of her close working relationship with her husband, Azria explains, "We're a great combo. Max is the visionary, and I'm more detail-oriented. It creates the perfect balance."

Azria is often called the muse of BCBG Max Azria Group, being the design inspiration for her late husband and even insisting on fitting the pants on herself. She defines style as "grace, confidence and effortlessness," and describes her personal style as "independent, free and chic."

In 2006 Azria and her husband debuted the collection Max Azria, and BCBG Max Azria, in two shows during New York Fashion Week. In February 2008, the couple added the brand Hervé Léger by Max Azria to their lineup, marking the first time in history that an American designer produced three different fashion shows during one New York Fashion Week. Historically after each show, Azria, typically dressed in one of the collection's looks, would join her husband on the runway to address the audience.

Azria partnered with perfumer Sarah Horowitz-Thran to create BCBG Max Azria's first fragrance, called Within, which launched in stores across the United States in November 2009. Azria was involved with the development of the scent, and Horowitz-Thran calls her the inspiration behind it. Azria's image is on the packaging as well as the bottle she says, "because this is something that I feel strongly about. There is a real person behind the vision."

Azria used social media to connect with customers. "You don't always have to be right," she has said, "but you have to be focused on the customers' needs." She maintained a blog with behind-the-scenes information and creative inspiration, and she frequently updated the company's Twitter page. Azria has said that she watches "the TED conference incessantly" and that browsing YouTube is her "favorite part of the day."

In 2010, Azria was recognized for her work as a designer with membership in the Council of Fashion Designers of America (CFDA), inducted as part of its Class of 2010.

BCBG Max Azria Group filed for Chapter 11 bankruptcy protection on February 28, 2017; it was reported that in July 2017 the brand and its sister labels would be taken over by Marquee Brands and Global Brands Group, which bought the intellectual property rights and assets of the company.

Nearly three years after leaving her job as creative director of BCBG, Lubov introduced her new label, La Bohème in 2019.

== Personal life ==
Lubov married Max Azria on July 11, 1992, and remained together for 27 years until his death. He died of lung cancer at a hospital in Houston on May 6, 2019. They had three daughters, Chloe, Anais and Agnes; Azria is also stepmother to Max's three elder children, Michael, Joyce and Marine. Azria lives with her family in Holmby Hills, California, in a 60-room mansion called la Maison du Soleil that Azria decorated along with interior designer Aly Daly, built by architect Paul Williams and valued at 85 million dollars.

Azria is involved with arts and charitable organizations. With her husband, Azria has co-chaired for three consecutive years the annual Art Party Benefit in support of the Whitney Museum of American Art's Independent Study Program. The Azrias co-hosted with Kate Bosworth in 2007, with Rachel Bilson in 2008 and with Camilla Belle in 2009. Azria collaborated with artist E.V. Day In 2008 for an Hervé Léger-inspired sculpture sold at auction during the event, and with artist Mark Fox in 2009 to create a limited edition umbrella celebrating the legacy of Gertrude Vanderbilt Whitney, the museum's founder.

Each October BCBG Max Azria partners with Susan G. Komen for the Cure to raise money for breast cancer awareness through the sale of merchandise. In 2008 the partnership's pink sunglasses and pashminas were featured on The Ellen DeGeneres Show. Through the Max Azria brand, Azria has been a longtime supporter of Help Malawi and sold the label's Help Malawi T-shirt on the company's website. Azria has participated in 2009s Fashion's Night Out event and 2010's Fashion for Haiti effort.
