= Fung Hon-chu =

Hong Kong businessman (1911–1994)

Fung Hon-chu (Chinese: 馮漢柱; Jyutping: fung^{4} hon^{3} cyu^{5}; 27 January 1911 – 9 August 1994) was a Hong Kong businessman and chairman of the Li & Fung, a leading trading firm in Hong Kong.

Fung was born in Canton in 1911 to Fung Pak-liu, the founder of the Li & Fung Limited. He joined the family business as manager and arrived in Hong Kong in 1935 and set up a branch there in 1937. He succeeded his father as the director of the Li & Fung in 1945. In 1975, he became the chairman of the Li & Fung.

He was also president of the Hong Kong Cotton Merchants Association and member of the Federation of Hong Kong Industries. He became a chancellor of the Tung Wah Group of Hospitals in 1951 and became its chairman in 1953. He was also vice-chairman of the Hong Kong Football Association, chairman and president of the South China Athletic Association.

From 1960 to 1966, he was the appointed member of the Urban Council of Hong Kong. He was first appointed as provisional member of the Legislative Council of Hong Kong in 1962, and became the full-time unofficial member of the Legislative Council in 1964 until 1970 when he was succeeded by Oswald Victor Cheung. He was made justice of the peace in 1960 and was awarded the Officer of the Order of the British Empire (OBE) in 1965.

He died on 9 August 1994 in Hong Kong, aged 83. He married Charity Lee Pui-yiu and had two sons, Victor Fung and William Fung, both prominent businessmen in Hong Kong, and three daughters.

Non-profit organization positions
Preceded by Lee Ying Sang	Chairman of the Tung Wah Group of Hospitals; 1953–1954	Succeeded by Seaward Woo
