= Jasmine Trias =

American singer

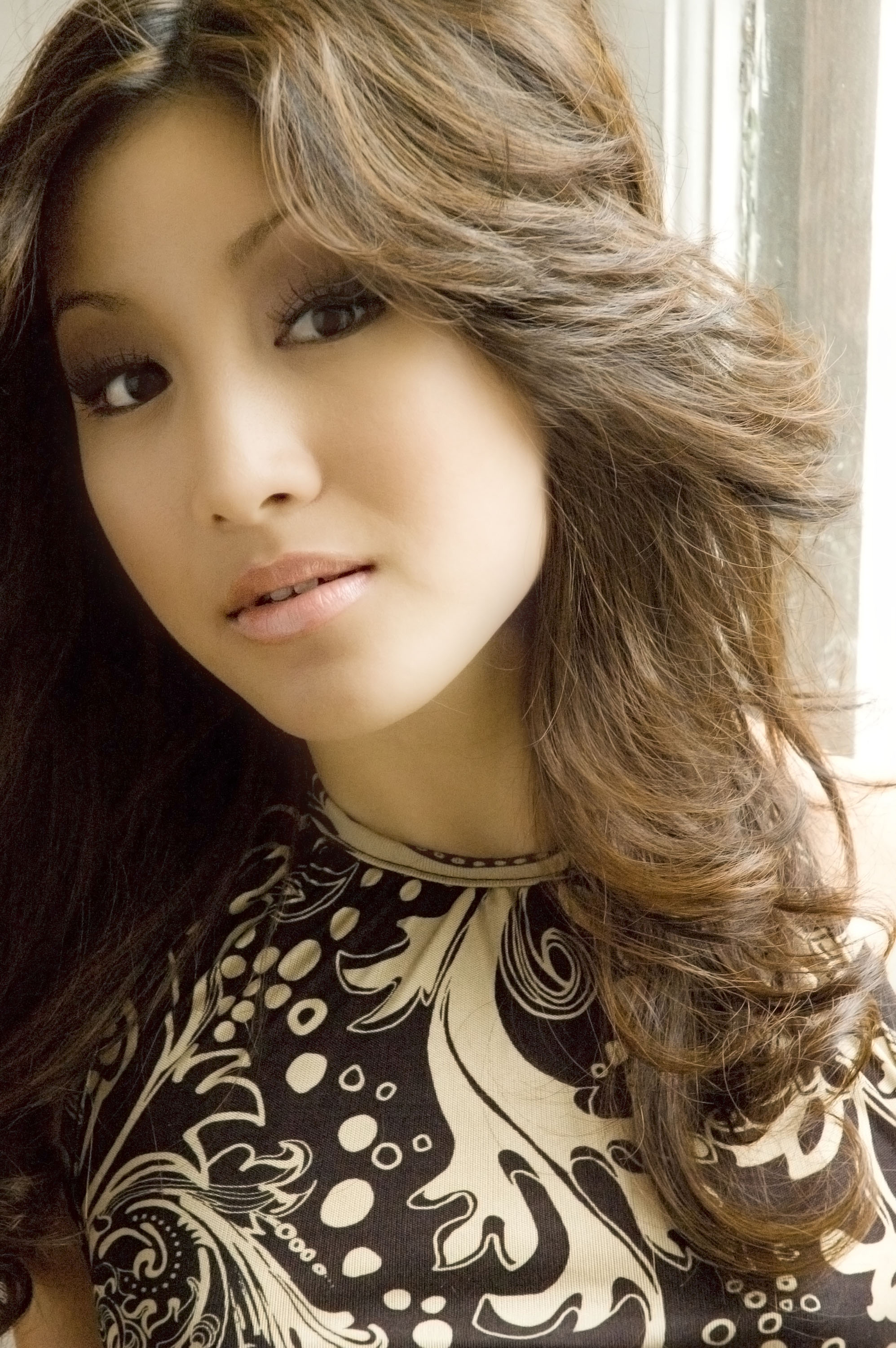

Background information
- Born: Jasmine Trias; November 3, 1986 (age 40); Honolulu, Hawaii
- Origin: Mililani Town, Hawaii, United States
- Genres: Pop, R&B, soul, OPM
- Years active: 2004–present
- Label: Universal Records
- Website: Official site

Jasmine Trias (/ˈtriːəs/; born November 3, 1986) is an American singer who was the third place finalist on the third season of American Idol. She has released one album to date, Jasmine Trias.

== Biography ==
Trias was born in Honolulu, Hawaii, and raised in Mililani Town, Hawaii. She is the eldest daughter of Filipino immigrants to Hawaii from Tanza, Cavite. Trias attended Maryknoll School, a Roman Catholic preparatory school of the Diocese of Honolulu. As a representative of Maryknoll School, she won the Brown Bags to Stardom 2001 state singing competition and the Road to Fame 2003 youth talent competition. Trias graduated from Maryknoll School in June 2004.

== American Idol ==
Trias gained recognition on the third season of American Idol. She auditioned in her home state of Hawaii. Trias made it to the top twelve performers. She received praises on her rendition of "Inseparable" on Top 12 night, with Simon Cowell replying, "Jasmine, it was just superb". Paula Abdul even threw a rose to her on the stage and, together with Randy Jackson, praised her maturity in that performance.

She was able to survive eliminations, despite criticisms on her performances on some instances of the competition. She landed on the bottom 3 with Camile Velasco and Diana DeGarmo. On Top 4 performance night, when she received criticisms for her performance of "It's Raining Men" by The Weather Girls, Cowell suggested that night that she would be eliminated the next day, but she made it into the top 3. On the Top 3 results show, when Ryan Seacrest announced that Trias was eliminated, she had her last message on American Idol: "I wanna thank all my fans for believing in me and for embracing my talents and for making my dreams come true. I mean, this top 3, I cannot ask for more". Trias was the highest-placed Asian-American contestant on American Idol until Jessica Sanchez made it in the eleventh season finale.

=== Performances/results ===
Week #	Theme	Song choice	Original artist	Order #	Result
Top 32/Group 4	N/A	"Run to You"	Whitney Houston	5	Advanced
Top 12	Soul	"Inseparable"	Natalie Cole	11	Safe
Top 11	Country	"Breathe"	Faith Hill	8	Safe
Top 10	Motown	"You're All I Need to Get By"	Marvin Gaye & Tammi Terrell	7	Safe
Top 9	Elton John	"Don't Let the Sun Go Down on Me"	Elton John	3	Bottom 2
Top 8	Movie Soundtracks	"When I Fall in Love"	Celine Dion & Clive Griffin	6	Safe
Top 7	Barry Manilow	"I'll Never Love This Way Again"	Barry Manilow	4	Safe
Top 6	Gloria Estefan	"Here We Are"	Gloria Estefan	5	Bottom 3
Top 5	Big band	"The Way You Look Tonight" "Almost Like Being in Love"	Tony Bennett; Nat King Cole	4; 9	Bottom 2^{1}
Top 4	Disco	"Everlasting Love" "It's Raining Men"	Carl Carlton; The Weather Girls	1; 5	Safe
Top 3	Contestant's Choice; Judge's Choice(Paula Abdul); Clive Davis' Choice	"Saving All My Love for You" "Mr. Melody" "All by Myself"	Whitney Houston; Natalie Cole; Eric Carmen	1; 4; 7	Eliminated

- ^Note 1: When Ryan Seacrest announced the results in the particular night, Trias was in the bottom two, but declared safe when George Huff was eliminated.

== Post Idol career ==
After Trias' appearance on American Idol, her fanbase grew in the United States and in foreign countries where the show was aired: Australia, Hong Kong, Malaysia, Indonesia, Philippines, Singapore, and Taiwan, among others. The Manila Times newspaper captured the mood of her ancestral country in an April headline: "Everybody Wants Jasmine." During the American Idol season, hundreds of internet fan sites from over a dozen countries were established in several Asian and European languages. She also appeared in the fourth season finale and the fifteen season finale of American Idol.

== Trias in the Philippines ==
In the Philippines, Trias has done television commercials and billboard ads for McDonald's, Smart Telecommunications, Hapee Toothpaste, and Bench Clothing. On October 6, 2004, Trias released a promotional single for McDonald's, "Love Ko 'To", (the local translation of McDonald's "i'm lovin' it" slogan). McDonald's restaurants in the Philippines offered a promotional meal called the "Jasmine Trio", which consisted of a Strawberry Float, fries, and the McDonald's exclusive "Love Ko 'To" CD-Single.

Trias also appeared on the reality show Extra Challenge with Ruffa Gutierrez and Donita Rose. She also visited the housemates of Pinoy Big Brother: Celebrity Edition on March 6 and stayed in the house overnight, leaving on March 7.

In 2006, Trias' life story was dramatized in the anthology series Magpakailanman, where she was played by Jolina Magdangal. In 2006 and 2007, Trias starred in two episodes of the music anthology series Your Song which featured two of her songs as the title songs.

== Career ==
Managing Director of Honolulu Ben Lee summarized the mood in Trias' home state of Hawaii by saying, "Jasmine has enough votes in Hawaii to become governor or mayor easily." Lieutenant Governor Duke Aiona, in his capacity as acting governor, declared Jasmine Trias Day by executive order. Trias has also done various commercials in Hawaii discouraging smoking, drinking, and drug use. On February 27, 2005, Trias released a CD single entitled "Flying Home," which was sold exclusively in Pizza Hut and Taco Bell stores in Hawaii. The single was intended to capture her feelings of returning to Hawaii after months of working on tour and on her album.

Trias was a part of the JCPenney and Seventeen "Rock Your Prom" Fashion Show. She performed in Springfield, Missouri and Glendale, California in March 2005.

Musically, some have compared Trias to Michelle Branch and Vanessa Carlton. Trias signed a record deal with Clockwork Entertainment, a company which has worked with Dream and Bad Boy Records (headed by P. Diddy), to record and produce her debut album. She also signed a record deal with Universal Records for the album's release in the Philippines. Her self-titled debut album with Clockwork Entertainment was released on July 12, 2005, in the U.S. It has since sold 14,000 copies in the US alone according to Nielsen SoundScan and a reported 50,000 worldwide. She has since been certified platinum in the Philippines. Trias headlined tours in Manila, San Francisco, Los Angeles, and Guam in 2004. To end her whirlwind visit to the Philippines, dubbed "Jasmania," she met President Gloria Macapagal Arroyo. Trias left Clockwork Entertainment due to poor management and promotion; and is now with Universal Records Philippines. "Excuses," "Sana Lagi," "Too Many Walls" and "DJ Don't Quit" peaked in the Top 10 on a popular Live365 Internet station called Idol Waves. "I'd Rather" managed to reach number one.

Trias was featured in the music video to The Black Eyed Peas single "Bebot," playing apl.de.ap's sister. She was featured as a commentator on MTV/TRL for the sixth season of American Idol. She also filmed a movie in the Philippines titled "Suddenly It's Magic"; it is shelved indefinitely. In addition, she was featured as a guest judge for a children's competition on The Tyra Banks Show and made appearances on three American Idol national follow-up shows: American Idol Extra, American Idol Tonight and It's Your Call with Lynn Doyle.

== Discography ==
=== Albums ===
Year	Album details	Peak positions		Certifications (sales threshold)	Sales
Year	Album details	US Indie	US Heat	Certifications (sales threshold)	Sales
2005	Jasmine Trias: Released: US: July 12, 2005 PH: September 1, 2005 AS: April 6, 2006; Label: Universal/Clockwork; Format: CD	20	11	AS: Platinum; PH: Platinum	US sales: 14,000; Asia sales: 30,000; Philippines sales: 15,000; Worldwide sales: 59,000

=== Singles ===
- 2004: "Love 'Ko To"
- 2005: "Excuses"
- 2005: "Lose Control"
- 2006: "Sana Lagi"
- 2006: "Kung Paano"
- 2006: "I'd Rather"
- 2007: "The Christmas Song"

=== Album appearances ===
- 2005: American Idol Season 3: Greatest Soul Classics
  - "Midnight Train to Georgia"
  - "Ain't No Mountain High Enough" (with the Top 12 finalists)

== Awards and recognitions ==
Year	Award-giving Body	Award	Result
2006	MTV Pilipinas	Favorite Hip-Hop/R&B Video ("Lose Control")	Nominated
2006	Mobile MYX Top Picks	Ringtone of the Week (May) ("Kung Paano")	Won
2006	The Hawaii Academy of Recording Arts Na Hoku Hanohano Awards	Female Vocalist of the Year	Nominated
2006	The Hawaii Academy of Recording Arts Na Hoku Hanohano Awards	Most Promising Artist of the Year	Nominated
2006	The Hawaii Academy of Recording Arts Na Hoku Hanohano Awards	Contemporary Album of the Year	Nominated
2006	PARI's Awit Awards (the Philippine Grammy Awards)	Best R&B Song ("Lose Control")	Nominated
2006	PARI's Awit Awards (the Philippine Grammy Awards)	Best Vocal Arrangement ("Lose Control")	Nominated
2006	Hawaii Music Awards	Pop Album of the Year	Won
2006	Hawaii Music Awards	Best New Artist of the Year	Won
2006	Philippine Hip-Hop Music Awards	Female R&B Artist of the Year	Won
2005	Askmen.com	Singer of the Week (January)	Won
2005	AlohaJoe.com	Artist of the Month (August)	Won
2005	FHM Magazine (Philippines)	Top 100 Sexiest Women (#50)	Won
2005	Hawaii Music Awards	Entertainer of the Year	Won
2004	People Magazine (Asia)	People of the Year Award	Won
2004	Kalayaan Performing Arts	Music Award	Won
2004	Y Style Fashion Awards	Bench Model of the Year	Won
2004	Maryknoll High School	Music Award	Won
2004	Quezon City Chamber of Ngo-Po Inc	Filipino World Class Achiever's Award	Won

== Videography ==
- 2004: "Love 'Ko To"
- 2004: "Kailangan Koy Ikaw" (for Smart IDD)
- 2005: "Excuses"
- 2005: "Lose Control"
- 2005: "Sana Lagi"
- 2006: "Kung Paano"
- 2006: "Bebot", Generations 1 and 2 (by The Black Eyed Peas)
- 2007: "Pinoy Love" (by Honore)

== Filmography ==
=== Television ===
Year	Show	Episode	Role	Notes
2009	Bukas Na Lang Kita Mamahalin	series	Herself	Airs on ABS-CBN
2008	Pacific Groove		Herself (TV host)	
2007	Your Song: Ang Soundtrack ng LoveLife mo!	"I'd Rather," by Jasmine Trias	Joanne	Airs on ABS-CBN
2006	Your Song: Ang Soundtrack ng LoveLife mo!	"Kung Paano," by Jasmine Trias	Charry	Airs on ABS-CBN
