= Convenience Retail Asia =

Hong Kong retail company

Convenience Retail Asia Limited 利亞零售有限公司
- Type: Listed company
- Industry: Retailing
- Founded: 1985
- Headquarters: Hong Kong
- Area served: People's Republic of China; Hong Kong; Macau
- Key people: Chairman: Dr. Victor Fung; CEO: Mr. Michael Tang
- Parent: Li & Fung
- Subsidiaries: Circle K (until 2020), Saint Honore Cake Shop
- Website: Convenience Retail Asia Limited

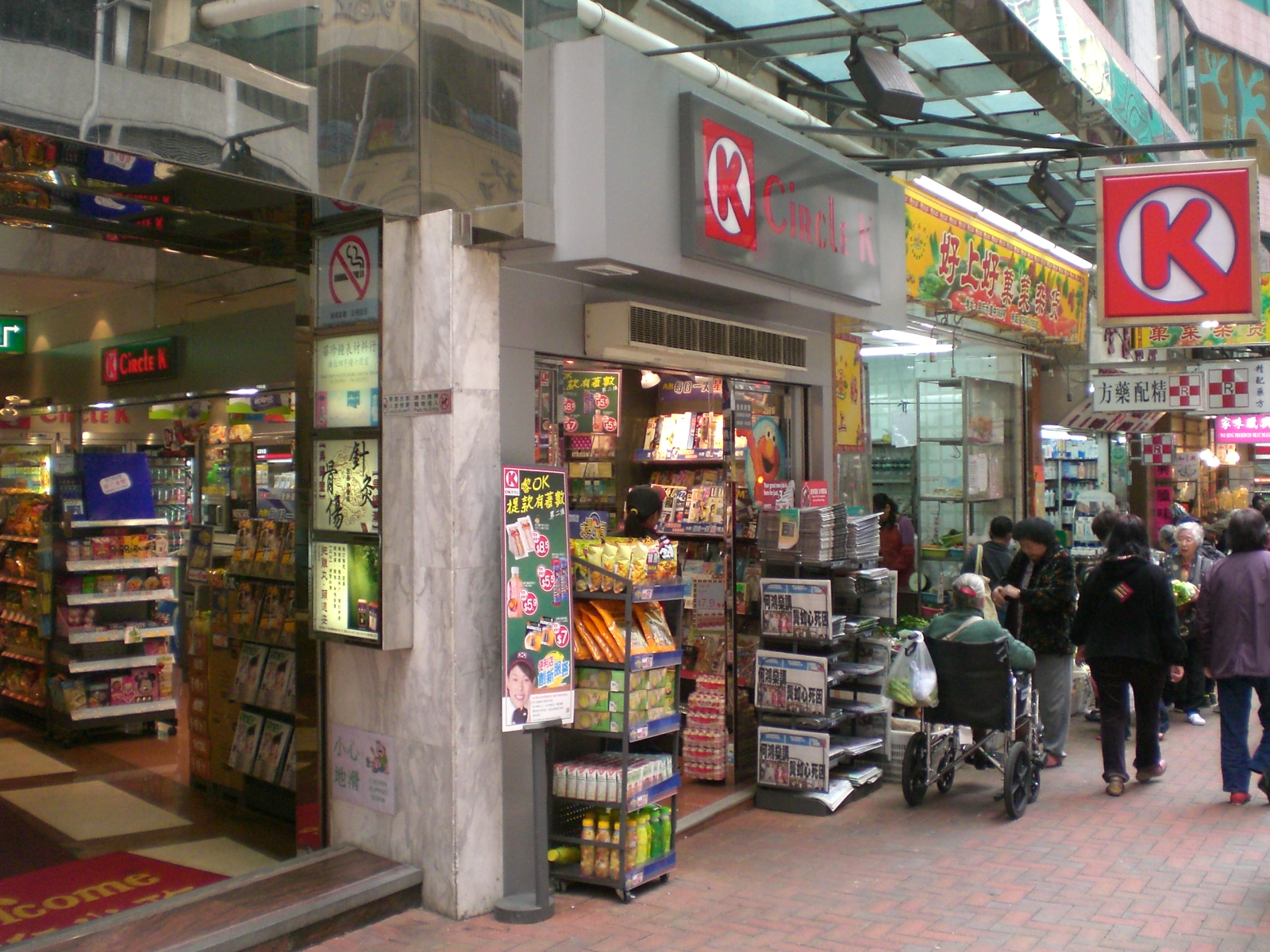
A Circle K convenience store in Sheung Wan, Hong Kong

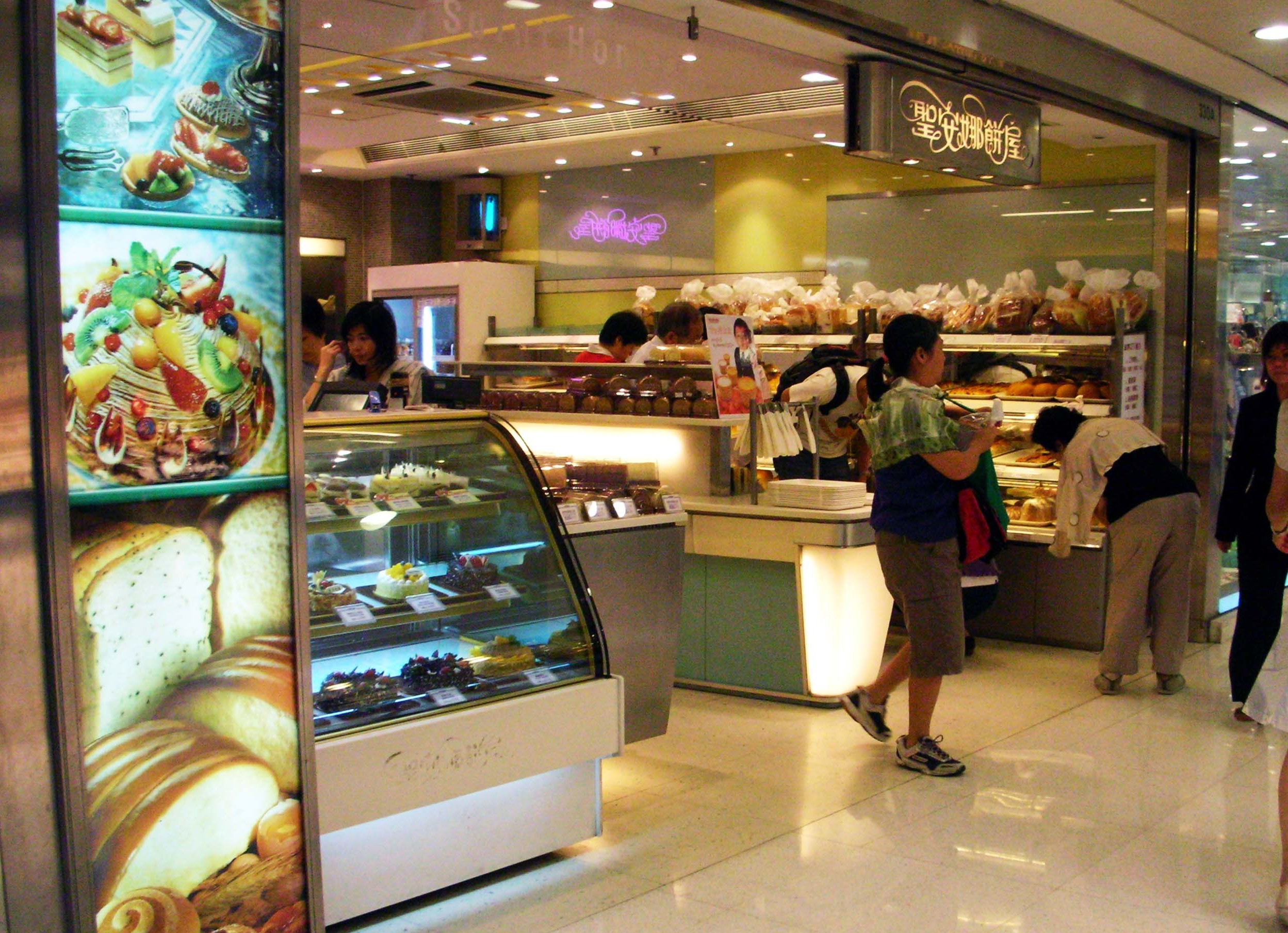
A Saint Honore Cake Shop in Chai Wan, Hong Kong

Convenience Retail Asia Limited (CRA) (SEHK: 831) is a Hong Kong retailer which owns bakeries (Saint Honore Cake Shop, Bread Boutique) in Hong Kong, Macau and mainland China. It previously owned the Hong Kong franchise for convenience store chain Circle K, but sold the chain to the franchise owner in late 2020.

The company was established in 1985 and is headquartered in Hong Kong. It is a subsidiary of Fung Group, one of the largest retailers in Hong Kong.

The company was listed on the Growth Enterprise Market board (stock code: 8052) of Hong Kong Stock Exchange. The company subsequently transferred its listing to the Main Board of the Stock Exchange of Hong Kong (stock code: 831) in June 2011.

== Link ==
- Convenience Retail Asia Limited
