= Honoré =

- Language: French

Origin
- Meaning: from a medieval personal name (Latin Honoratus 'honored')

Honoré, also spelled Honore, is a name of French origin and may refer to:

== Given name ==
=== Sovereigns of Monaco ===
- Honoré I, Lord of Monaco (1522–1581)
- Honoré II, Prince of Monaco (1597–1662)
- Honoré III, Prince of Monaco (1720–1795), also Duke of Valentinois
- Honoré IV, Prince of Monaco (1758–1819), also Duke of Valentinois
- Honoré V, Prince of Monaco (1778–1841), also Duke of Valentinois

=== Other people ===
- Master Honoré (fl. 1288–1318), Parisian secular manuscript illuminator
- Honoré Achim (1881–1950), Canadian politician and lawyer
- Honoré Bailet (1920–2003), French politician and businessman
- Honoré de Balzac (1799–1850), French novelist and playwright
- Honoré Beaugrand (1848–1906), Canadian journalist, newspaper founder and publisher, politician, author and folklorist
- Honoré Bouche (1599–1671), French priest and historian
- Honoré Champion (1846–1913), French publisher
- Honoré Chavée (1815–1877), Belgian linguist
- Honoré Commeurec (1878–1945), French typographer, union activist, printing cooperative leader, politician and World War II French Resistance member
- Honoré Daumier (1808–1879), French painter, sculptor and printmaker
- Honoré Dutrey (c. 1894–1935), American jazz trombonist
- Honoré d'Estienne d'Orves (1901–1941), French Navy and World War II French Resistance member
- Honoré Fabri (1607 or 1608–1688), French Jesuit theologian, mathematician and physicist
- Honoré Flaugergues (1755–1835 or 1830), French astronomer
- Honoré Fragonard (1732–1799), French anatomist
- Honore Gomis (born 1996), Senegalese footballer
- Honoré Jackson (1861–1952), secretary to Louis Riel during the North-West Rebellion
- Honoré Jacquinot (1815–1887), French surgeon and zoologist
- Honoré Mercier (1840–1894), former premier of Quebec, Canada
- Honoré Mercier Jr. (1875–1937), a member of the Legislative Assembly of Quebec, son of the above
- Honoré Mercier III (1908–1988), a member of the Legislative Assembly of Quebec, son of the above
- Honoré Ngbanda (1946–2021), Congolese politician, diplomat and Minister of Defense
- Honoré Willsie Morrow (1880-1940), American author and magazine editor
- Honoré Charles Reille (1775–1860), French soldier, Marshal of France
- Honoré Gabriel Riqueti, comte de Mirabeau (1749–1791), French writer, orator, statesman and a prominent figure of the early stages of the French Revolution
- Honoré Rakotomanana (born 1933), Malagasy politician and judge, former Speaker of the Senate of Madagascar
- Honoré Tournély (1658–1729), French Catholic theologian
- Honoré Traoré (1957–2026), Burkinabé army general and interim head of state of Burkina Faso for one day
- Honoré d'Urfé (1568–1625), French novelist

== Surname ==
- Annik Honoré (1957–2014), Belgian journalist and music promoter
- Bo Honoré, Danish economist
- Carl Honoré (born 1967), Canadian journalist and author
- Caroline Honoré (born 1970), French former triple jumper
- Christophe Honoré (born 1970), French writer and director
- Emile Honoré, African-American politician, Secretary of State of Louisiana in 1877 and member of the Louisiana House of Representatives
- Erik Honoré (born 1966), Norwegian writer, musician, record producer and sound engineer
- Hector Honoré (1905–1983), American auto racer
- Henry Honoré (1824–1916), American businessman
- Henry Honore, Welsh Roman Catholic Dean of Bangor from 1410 until 1413
- Jean Honoré (1920–2013), French Catholic cardinal
- Mikkel Frølich Honoré (born 1997), Danish cyclist
- Philippe Honoré (cartoonist) (1941–2015), French cartoonist killed in the Charlie Hebdo shooting
- Philippe Honoré (violinist) (born 1967), French violinist
- Russel L. Honoré (born 1947), retired US Army lieutenant general
- Suzanne Honoré (1909-2000), French librarian, archivist and historian
- Tony Honoré (1921–2019), British lawyer and jurist

== See also ==
- Saint-Honoré (disambiguation)
- Honorius (disambiguation)
- Honor (given name)
