= Just a Fool (disambiguation) =

"Just a Fool" is a 2012 song by Christina Aguilera and Blake Shelton.

Just a Fool may also refer to:

- "Just a Fool", a 1956 song by Eddie Boyd and His Chess Men
- "Just a Fool", a 1979 song by The Sanford-Townsend Band
- "Just a Fool", a song by Jasmine Trias from Jasmine Trias
- "Just a Fool", a song by Sultans from Sultans (2000)
- "Just a Fool", a song by Suzi Rawn from album Because of Love (2004)
- "Just a Fool", a song by Outlawz from The Lost Songs Vol. 2 (2010)
