= Max Azria =

French-American fashion designer

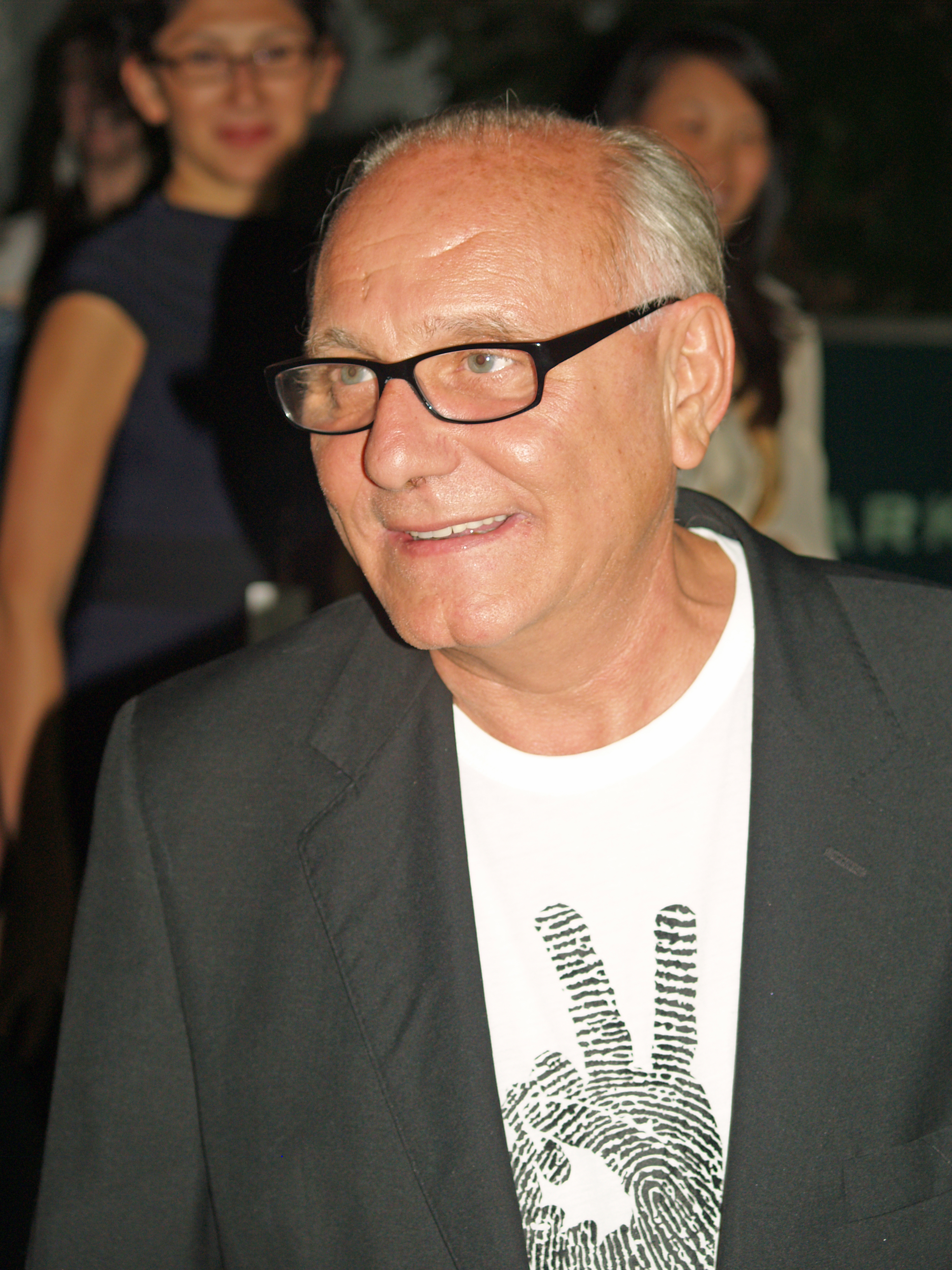
- Azria at Spring 2009 Mercedes-Benz Fashion Week in Manhattan, New York
- Born: January 1, 1949; Sfax, French protectorate of Tunisia (now part of Tunisia)
- Died: May 6, 2019 (aged 70); Houston, Texas, U.S.
- Known for: BCBGMAXAZRIA; Runway; Hervé Léger by Max Azria; Max Azria; BCBGeneration; Miley Cyrus & Max Azria
- Spouse: Lubov Azria (m. 1992)
- Children: 6

Max Azria (January 1, 1949 – May 6, 2019) was a French-American fashion designer who founded the contemporary women's clothing brand BCBG Max Azria. He was also the designer, chairman, and CEO of the BCBG Max Azria Group, a global fashion house which encompassed over 20 brands. He left BCBG in 2016. BCBG Max Azria filed for bankruptcy in 2017 and was sold to Marquee Brands and Global Brands Group.

Later Azria was the CEO of ZappLight.

== Early life and education ==
Max Azria was born in Sfax, Tunisia, the youngest of six children to a family of Tunisian Jews. As a child, he was educated in southeastern France before his family immigrated to Paris in 1963. His brother is Serge Azria, the founder of the women's clothing lines Joie, Current/Elliott, and Equipment which is based in Los Angeles.

== Career ==
After 11 years of designing a line of women's apparel in Paris, Azria moved to Los Angeles in 1981 and launched Jess, a series of new-concept retail boutiques for women's apparel.

In 1989, Azria launched BCBG Max Azria, named for the French phrase "bon chic, bon genre," a Parisian slang phrase which means "good style, good attitude". He was applauded for offering designer fashion at affordable price points and inducted into the Council of Fashion Designers of America (CFDA) in 1998. The BCBG Max Azria Runway collection was first presented at New York Fashion Week in 1996.

Azria maintained two eponymous designer collections, Max Azria Atelier and Max Azria. Launched in February 2004, Max Azria Atelier is a collection of couture gowns created for celebrity clients and red-carpet events. Sharon Stone, Halle Berry, Fergie, and Alicia Keys have worn the label on red carpets. In February 2006, Azria debuted Max Azria, a ready-to-wear collection with a directional aesthetic on the runway at New York Fashion Week. During the 2009 awards season, Angelina Jolie wore Max Azria to the 2009 Screen Actors Guild Awards and the 2009 Critics Choice Awards. In 2006, the company bought out G+G Retail (including the G+G and Rave brands) which had gone bankrupt.

Azria acquired the Hervé Léger fashion house in 1998, marking the first time in history that an American designer had acquired a French couturier. In early 2007, he relaunched the Hervé Léger label with his own designs, which were quickly embraced by celebrities and trendsetters worldwide. In fall 2008, Max Azria presented BCBG Max Azria Runway, Max Azria, and Hervé Léger by Max Azria at New York Fashion Week; this was the first time an American designer produced three major fashion shows throughout a single New York Fashion Week event.

Azria launched a young contemporary collection called BCBGeneration in 2008. In June 2009, he and Miley Cyrus teamed up to create a line for Walmart called Miley Cyrus & Max Azria. Azria designed clothing for Cyrus' 2009 American tour. He left BCBG in 2016 as the company foundered and BCBG Max Azria filed for bankruptcy in 2017. It was sold to Marquee Brands and Global Brands Group in the same year.

On May 31, 2017, ZappLight announced that Max Azria joined ZappLight and its parent co Clean Concept LLC as CEO and partner. "Though fashion and technology are inherently different, they increasingly intersect as both are centered on pushing the boundaries of great design and in inspiring and delighting consumers. I am thrilled to be part of this new and exciting venture to grow ZappLight into a global brand, adopted in homes everywhere to prevent virus-carrying insects," Max Azria said in a statement. Entrepreneurial at heart, it was only natural for the 68 year old to dive into a startup rather than retire. ZappLight is a "2-in-1" LED light bulb and bug zapper. ZappLight is disrupting the bug zapper industry that has been around since the 80's. The ZappLight's new spin is combining an LED light that attracts bugs and mosquitoes and functions as an actual light bulb, along with the zapping technology of old. The ZappLight is a bulb and not an entire fixture, meaning that homeowners can install them in any of their open bulb light fixtures outside.

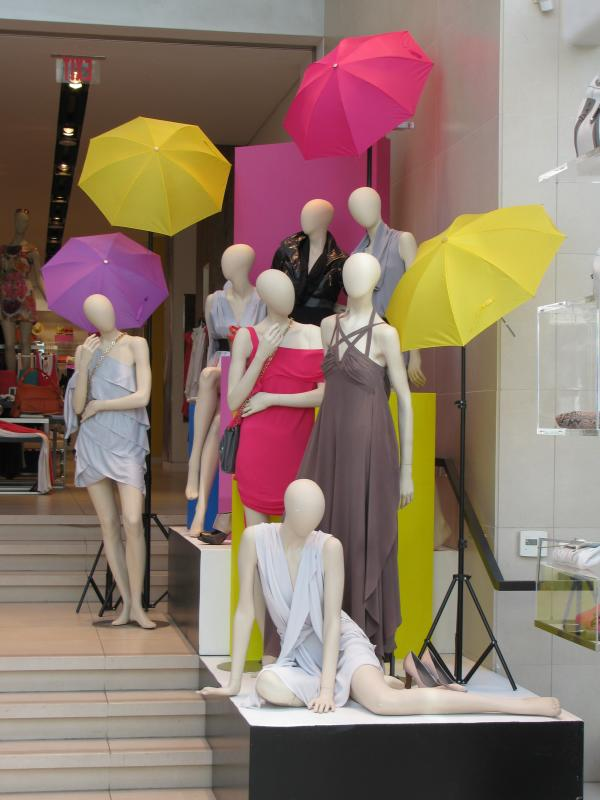
Max Azria's Collection in March 2009, Los Angeles

BCBG Max Azria Group is a global fashion house with a portfolio including more than 20 brands. Max Azria was the CEO, chairman and head designer and his widow, Lubov Azria is the chief creative officer.

As of 2006 there were over 550 BCBG Max Azria boutiques worldwide, including locations in London, Paris, Tokyo; Santiago, Chile; and Hong Kong. Azria's collections are also sold in specialty stores and major department stores across the globe including Nordstrom, Saks Fifth Avenue, Bergdorf Goodman, Lord & Taylor, Bloomingdale's, Macy's, Dillard's, the UK's Harvey Nichols, Hong Kong's Lane Crawford, Taiwan's Mitsukoshi, and Singapore's Takashimaya stores.

BCBG Max Azria Group campaigns regularly feature notable models including Eva Herzigova, Karen Elson, and Jessica Stam. The company frequently works with internationally renowned photographers like Patrick Demarchelier, Paolo Roversi, and David Sims. BCBG Max Azria Group clothing is often featured in major fashion publications such as Vogue, InStyle, and Vanity Fair in addition to online sites including Style.com and iFashion Network.

=== Recent history ===
BCBG Max Azria Group filed for Chapter 11 bankruptcy protection on February 28, 2017; it was reported in July 2017 that the brand and its sister labels would be taken over by Marquee Brands and Global Brands Group, which bought the intellectual property rights and assets of the company. In May 2020, Centric Brands, who licensed the brand, filed for Chapter 11 bankruptcy protection, with BCBG Max Azria being included as an entity, named Centric BCBG LLC. Marquee Brands later brought back the license.

== Personal life ==
Azria was married twice. He was divorced from his first wife with whom he had three children: Michael John Azria (born 1974), Joyce Azria Nassir (born 1981), and Marine Azria (born 1984). Max was married to Lubov Azria, chief creative officer for BCBG Max Azria Group. Lubov was born in Ukraine. Max and Lubov had three children: Chloe (born 1993), Nushi (born 1996), and Agnes (born 1997). Max's daughter, Joyce Azria, became the creative director of BCBGeneration in 2009. Max and his family lived in a mansion designed by Paul Williams in Holmby Hills, a neighborhood in Los Angeles. It was formerly owned by the late Sidney Sheldon, a writer.

=== Death ===
Azria died of lung cancer at a hospital in Houston on May 6, 2019; he was 70.

== See also ==
- Retail apocalypse
- List of retailers affected by the retail apocalypse
