= MagnaReady =

American adaptive clothing company

- Type: Private
- Industry: Retail
- Founder: Maura Horton
- Headquarters: Raleigh, North Carolina, United States
- Area served: Worldwide
- Products: Clothing
- Website: magnaready.com

MagnaReady is an American clothing technology and e-commerce brand based in Raleigh, North Carolina, focused on producing adaptive clothing for those with dexterity issues. It was founded in 2013 by Maura Horton, after her husband, Don Horton, had trouble buttoning his shirts due to Parkinson's disease. MagnaReady develops patented magnetic shirt technology, which has also been licensed as MagnaClick.

== History ==
In 2009, Don Horton, a football coach at North Carolina State University, struggled to button his shirt in the locker room due to Parkinson's disease. His wife, Maura, sewed magnets into her husband's shirts for ease of use. After experimenting with the design she launched the first line of MangaReady shirts online in January of 2013. In 2015, a patent was granted for the technology.

In 2016, PVH Corp. licensed the core technology of MagnaReady as MagnaClick and launched their own line of shirts featuring it. The shirts were to be sold by select retailers in-store and online in the fall of 2016, including Amazon, Belk, J.C. Penney and Kohl's.

In September 2017, the MagnaReady technology was licensed in partnership with LF Americas, a division of Li & Fung, to create a new line of MagnaClick clothing, which was planned to launch in 2018.

In October 2017, a shirt using MagnaReady technology was featured by New York's Museum of Modern Art in the Items: Is Fashion Modern? exhibit as the modern version of a male dress shirt in January 2017.

On July 29, 2021, GBG USA filed for Chapter 11 bankruptcy and put a substantial portion of its assets up for sale, including MagnaReady.
