= Bruce Rockowitz =

Canadian Hong Kong-based businessman (born 1958)

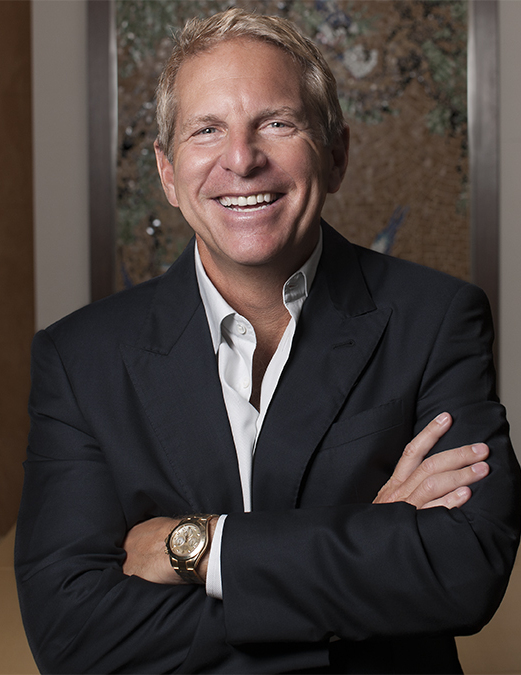
- Born: 1958 (age 67–68)
- Education: University of Vermont
- Occupation: Businessman
- Spouse: Coco Lee (m. 2011; died 2023)
- Children: 2

Bruce Philip Rockowitz (born 1958; Chinese name: 樂裕民) is a Canadian businessman based in Hong Kong. He is the chairman of Rock Media International, co-founder of the Pure Group and a director of technology consultancy firm Step Digital Group.

== Early life ==
Born in 1958, Rockowitz grew up in Boston, Massachusetts. Rockowitz dropped out of the University of Vermont to play tennis professionally in Hong Kong in 1979. He became head tennis coach at the Hong Kong Country Club, where he taught the then-chairman of Li & Fung.

== Career ==
Rockowitz was hired by fellow Canadian immigrant Allan Zeman after a chance meeting in Repulse Bay, Hong Kong. In 1981, he co-founded Colby International with Zeman, and served as CEO and president from 1986 to 2000. In 2000, Victor Fung and Li & Fung acquired Colby for HK$2.2 billion, and Rockowitz was CEO from 2011 to 2014.

In May 2014, Rockowitz became vice chairman and CEO of Global Brands Group, as it was spun off from Li & Fung. At the time, it was manufacturing apparel, shoes, and accessories for brands such as Calvin Klein, Kate Spade, Disney, Coach, and Tommy Hilfiger. He left Global Brands in 2019.

He is the co-founder and non-executive chairman of The Pure Group fitness chain and director of Wynn Macau.

He is the founder and currently chairman of Rock Media International.

Rockowitz is a member of the advisory boards for the Wharton School's Jay H Baker Retailing Center and the Fashion Institute of Technology.

In 2008, Rockowitz was ranked first by Institutional Investor for Asia’s Best CEOs in the consumer category. In 2010 and 2011, he was also recognized as one of the World’s 30 Best CEOs by Barron’s. In the years 2012, 2017 and 2018, he was named Asia’s Best CEO at Corporate Governance Asia’s Excellence Recognition Awards.

== Personal life ==
Rockowitz has two daughters from his first marriage. For his birthday in 2008, then-fiancée Lee hosted a party at Hong Kong's Grand Hyatt hotel, guests included Philip Green, Richard Caring, Solomon Lew, and Marc Ecko, and performers included Dita von Teese, Lionel Richie, Rihanna, Jewel, and David Blaine.

Rockowitz married the Hong Kong singer Coco Lee in October 2011. Performers at the lavish wedding banquet included Bruno Mars, Alicia Keys and Ne-Yo. Lee died in 2023, after twelve years of marriage.

Rockowitz was blamed by some for allegedly cheating on Lee. There were reports saying that Lee and her husband had been separated for some time before she died, and that they were due to sign the divorce papers in July 2023. When asked, "Can you say something to Coco?" on 1 August 2023 outside the crematorium where he was surrounded by paparazzi, Rockowitz said, "I love her. My whole life."
