= Rockowitz =

Rockowitz is a surname. Notable people with the surname include:

- Bruce Rockowitz (born 1958), Canadian businessman
- Glenn Rockowitz (born 1970), American writer, filmmaker, comedian, and voice actor
