= William Fung =

Hong Kong billionaire businessman (born 1949)

- Born: Fung Kwok-lun; 21 February 1949 (age 77); Hong Kong, China
- Citizenship: China; United Kingdom
- Education: Princeton University; Harvard Business School
- Occupation: Businessman
- Spouse: Sylvia Chou Siu Mei
- Children: 1
- Father: Fung Hon-chu
- Relatives: Victor Fung (brother)

William Fung Kwok-lun OBE JP (Chinese: 馮國綸; Jyutping: fung^{4} gwok^{3} leon^{4}; born 21 February 1949) is a Hong Kong billionaire businessman who is the group managing director of Li & Fung Group, one of the largest trading companies in Hong Kong.

== Early life ==
Fung was born in 1949 in Hong Kong. He attended Princeton University in its class of 1970, majoring in electrical engineering. He subsequently earned an MBA from Harvard Business School in 1972.

Fung is one of two sons of Fung Hon-chu, former head of Li & Fung, and grandson of Fung Pak-liu, founder of the family firm. He is the younger brother of Victor Fung Kwok-king, the chairman of the group.

== Career ==
Fung joined the family firm, and helped it expand to Taiwan, South Korea, Singapore and China.

Fung is a non-executive director of HSBC Holdings, CLP Holdings Limited, VTech Holdings Limited, Shui On Land Limited and Singapore Airlines.

Fung served as the international chair of the Pacific Economic Cooperation Council from 1999 to 2001.

== Philanthropy ==
Fund endowed the "Fung Scholarship" at his alma mater, Princeton University. In 2009, he was appointed to the university's board of trustees.

== Personal life ==
Fung is married with one son and holds British citizenship.

== See also ==
- List of Princeton University people
