= Saint-Honoré =

Saint Honoré most often refers to Honoratus of Amiens, a Frankish saint and bishop.

Saint-Honoré or Saint Honoré may also refer to:

== Places ==
=== Canada ===
- Saint-Honoré, Quebec, a city
- Saint-Honoré, Chaudière-Appalaches, Quebec, a former parish municipality, now part of Saint-Honoré-de-Shenley

=== France ===
- Saint-Honoré, Isère, a commune
- Saint-Honoré, Seine-Maritime, a commune
- Saint-Honoré, a former commune of the Finistère department, now part of Plogastel-Saint-Germain
- Rue Saint-Honoré, a street in Paris

== Other uses ==
- Saint Honore Cake Shop, a chain store in Hong Kong
- St Honoré, a fictional island in A Caribbean Mystery

== See also ==
- St. Honoré cake, also known as "Saint-Honoré"
- Saint-Honoré-de-Shenley, Quebec, a municipality
- Saint-Honoré-de-Témiscouata, Quebec, a municipality
- Saint-Honoré-les-Bains, Nièvre department, France
- Saint-Honoré d'Eylau, two churches in Paris
- Rue du Faubourg Saint-Honoré, in Paris
