= Saint Honore Cake Shop =

Bakeries of Hong Kong

Saint Honore Cake Shop Limited 聖安娜餅屋有限公司
- Type: Privately owned company
- Industry: Bakery
- Founded: 1972
- Headquarters: Kowloon, Hong Kong
- Area served: Hong Kong; Macau; PR China
- Key people: CEO: Mr. Michael Tang
- Parent: Convenience Retail Asia
- Website: Saint Honore Cake Shop

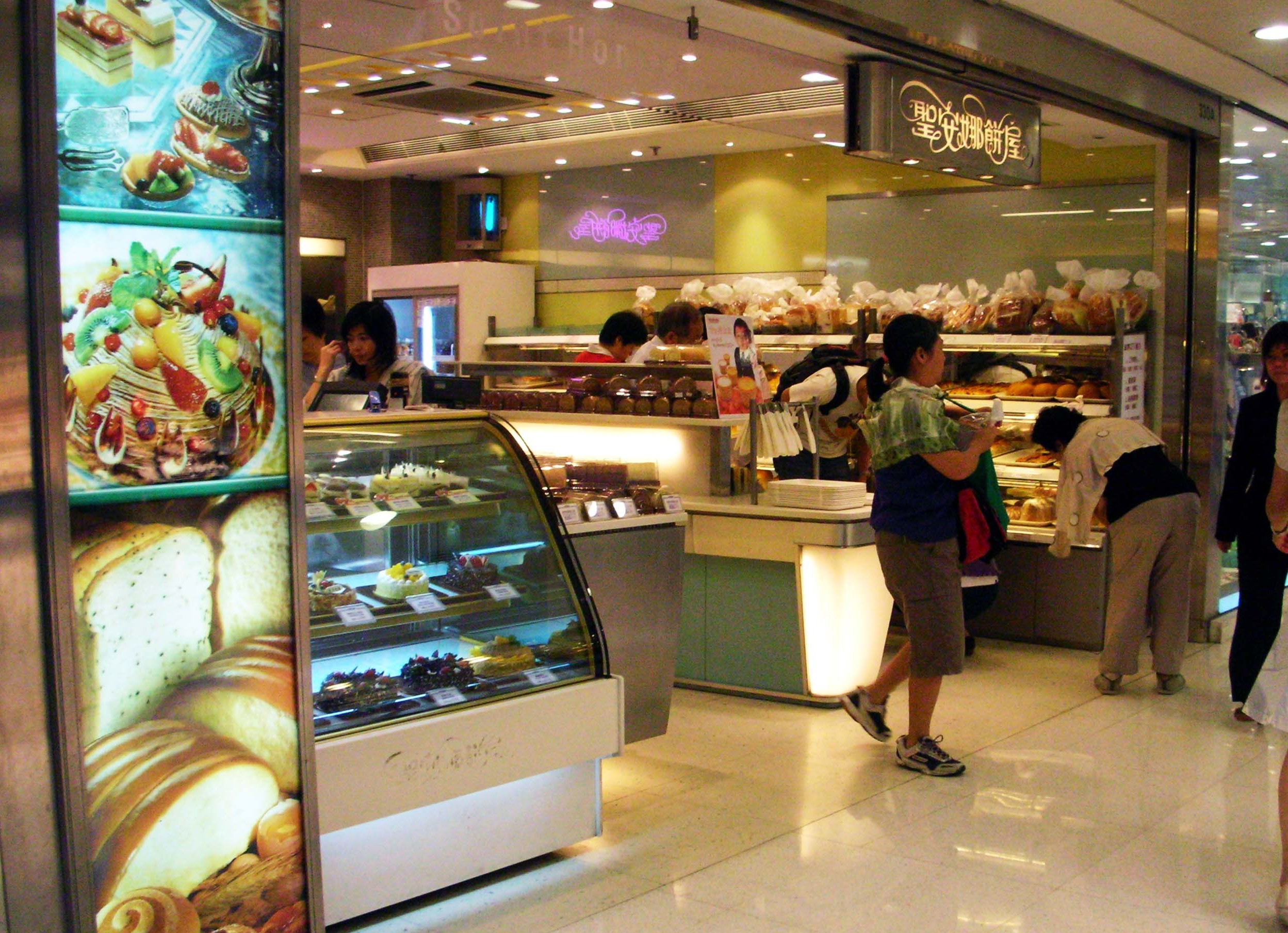
A Saint Honore Cake Shop in Chai Wan, Hong Kong

Saint Honore Cake Shop (Chinese: 聖安娜餅屋; Jyutping: sing3 on1 naa4 beng2 uk1) is one of the largest bakery and cake chain stores in Hong Kong. By 2009, it had over 80 outlets in Hong Kong. It is parented by Convenience Retail Asia Limited, the retailing flagship of Li & Fung.

The chain of stores is named in honour of Saint Honoratus of Amiens (Honoré in French), the patron saint of bakers.

== History ==
- 1972: Saint Honore Cake Shop Limited was established with the first shop set up in Happy Valley, Hong Kong.
- 1991: It was acquired by Hong Kong Catering Management Limited (formerly Yaohan International Caterers)
- 1992: It opened its first outlet in Macau.
- 1993: It established an automated bakery production line in Kowloon Bay.
- 1995: It established an automated manufacturing plant in Shenzhen.
- 1997: It was awarded ISO 9001 certificate.
- 2000: Saint Honore Holdings Limited (Chinese: 聖安娜控股有限公司) (SEHK: 192) was listed on the Hong Kong Stock Exchange.
- 2002: It opened its first outlet in Canton.
- 2007: It was acquired and privatized by Convenience Retail Asia.

== Link ==
- Saint Honore Cake Shop

== See others ==
- Convenience Retail Asia
- Li & Fung
