= Honorius (disambiguation) =

Honorius (384–423) was Roman emperor of the West from 393 to 423.

Honorius may also refer to:

== People ==
- Honorius of Canterbury (Saint Honorius, died 653), archbishop of Canterbury 627–653
- Honoratus of Amiens (Saint Honorius of Amiens), bishop of Amiens
- Pope Honorius I (died 638), Pope 625–638
- Pope Honorius II (died 1130), Pope 1124–1130
- Pope Honorius III (1150–1227), Pope 1216–1227
- Pope Honorius IV (1210–1287), Pope 1285–1287
- Antipope Honorius II (died 1072), 1061–1064
- Honorius of Thebes, dates unknown
- Honorius Augustodunensis (Honorius of Autun, 1080–1151), Christian theologian, 12th century
- Honorius of Kent, died after 1210, Archdeacon of Richmond and canonist

== Other uses ==
- Honorius (plant), a genus of plants
- Honorius, a character in the Bartimaeus Trilogy

== See also ==
- Honoré
