= Jasmine Trias (album) =

2005 studio album by Jasmine Trias

Studio album by Jasmine Trias
- Released: July 12, 2005 (U.S.); September 1, 2005 (Philippines); April 6, 2006 (Asia re-release)
- Recorded: 2005
- Genre: Pop; R&B
- Label: Universal Records; Clockwork Entertainment
- Producer: Vincent Herbert; Peter Stengaard; Alex Mejia; Debbie Hammond; Gary Greenburg; Kathleen Dy-Go; Vehnee Saturno; Ito Rapadas; DJ MOD; N8; Gav Beats; Shane Tsurugi; Anthem; RedEye; 3AM

Alternative covers
- Philippines cover

Alternative cover
- Asia re-released, repackaged edition cover

Professional ratings
Review scores
Source	Rating
Allmusic	4/5 stars

Jasmine Trias is the debut album from the Filipino-American singer Jasmine Trias.

== About the album ==
=== United States release ===
Jasmine Trias was released in the United States on July 12, 2005. The album was released by Clockwork Entertainment throughout the United States although there were many distribution problems in the first few months. In its first week, the album sold 5,000 copies; since then it has had a steady growth in sales. In its first week, it registered at No. 20 on Billboard's Independent Albums chart, No. 11 on Billboard's top heatseekers chart, and at No. 1 on Billboard's heatseekers (Pacific) chart. As of July 2007, the album had sold 14,000 copies in the United States alone according to Nielsen SoundScan. In late 2006, it was confirmed by Clockwork Entertainment, that the debut album had sold approximately 50,000 copies worldwide. On May 20, 2008, the album was finally released digitally onto iTunes and Amazon MP3.

=== Philippines release ===
Jasmine Trias was released in the Philippines on September 1, 2005, under the Universal Records label. This import contained a different track list that contained 2 new songs in Tagalog and 3 new songs in English. After 3 singles, the album was repackaged/re-released with 3 music videos, 3 new songs in English, and a new cover; it was a two-disc set. Charts and album sale information are unavailable for the Philippines. In 2006, the album was certified Platinum by the Philippine Association of the Record Industry (PARI), the Philippine version of the RIAA.

=== Production ===
Jasmine worked with executive producers Debbie Hammond (Dream) and Gary Greenburg; and Producers Vincent Herbert (JoJo, Babyface, Ashley Parker Angel, Toni Braxton, Deborah Cox, Destiny's Child), Peter Stengaard (Donna Summer, George Huff), and Alex Mejia.

== Track listing ==
=== U.S. release ===
1. "Sexy Boy" – 3:21 (produced by N8; written by Tavia Ivey, Nathan V. Walton, Tyrin Turner)
2. "Excuses" – 4:11 (produced by Vincent Herbert; written by Makeba Riddick, Vincent Herbert, Gav Beats)
3. "All I Need" (feat. Fatman Scoop) – 3:17 (original remix produced by Sean "Puffy" Combs, Alex Mejia, N8; Written by Ashford/Simpson)
4. "Whatcha Gon Do" – 4:14 (produced by N8; written by Devin Nimmers, Derric Nimmers, Tavia Ivey, Nathan V. Walton)
5. "DJ Don't Quit" – 3:42 (produced by N8, Alex Meija; written by Tavia Ivey, Devin Nimmers, Derric Nimmers, Nathan V. Walton)
6. "I Still Luv You" – 3:31 (produced by Vincent Herbet, Gav Beats; written by Vincent Herbert, Gav Beats, Chris, Andre Merritt)
7. "Don't Go" – 3:37 (produced by Vincent Herbert, Gav Beats; written by Vincent Herbert, Gav Beats, Chris, Andre Merritt, Cory "Co-P" Peterson)
8. "Just a Fool" – 4:05 (written and produced by Shane Tsurugi)
9. "Silly of Me" – 4:34 (written and produced by Anthem)
10. "I Won't Worry" – 3:50 (produced by RedEye; written by Makeba Riddick)
11. "Can't Hold Back" – 4:24 (written and produced by 3AM)
12. "What U Do to Me" – 2:56 (produced by Vincent Herbert and Gav Beats; written by Makeba Riddick, Vincent Herbert, Gav Beats)
13. "Inseparable" – 2:24 (produced by 3AM; written by Jackson Charles Henry Jr.)
14. "If I Ever See Heaven Again" – 4:14 (produced by Peter Stengaard; written and music by Diane Warren)

=== Philippines release ===
1. "Excuses" – 4:11 (produced by Vincent Herbert; written by Makeba Riddick, Vincent Herbert, Gav Beats)
2. "All I Need" (feat. Fatman Scoop) – 3:17 (original remix produced by Sean "Puffy" Combs, Alex Mejia, N8; written by Ashford/Simpson)
3. "Sana Lagi" – 3:47 (produced by Ito Rapadas; written by Ito Rapadas, John Barnard Borja)
4. "DJ Don't Quit" – 3:42 (produced by N8, Alex Meija; written by Tavia Ivey, Devin Nimmers, Derric Nimmers, Nathan V. Walton)
5. "Once Again" (feat. South Border) – 4:25 (produced by Jay Durias; written by Jay Durias, Sharon Inductivo)
6. "What U Do to Me" – 2:56 (produced by Vincent Herbert and Gav Beats; written by Makeba Riddick, Vincent Herbert, Gav Beats)
7. "Can't Hold Back" – 4:24 (written and produced by 3AM)
8. "Lose Control" – 2:30 (produced and written by DJ MOD)
9. "Don't Go" – 3:37 (produced by Vincent Herbert, Gav Beats; written by Vincent Herbert, Gav Beats, Chris, Andre Merritt, Cory "Co-P" Peterson)
10. "Inseparable" (new mix) – 2:39 (produced by Ito Rapadas; written by Jackson Charles Henry Jr.)
11. "I Still Luv You" – 3:31 (produced by Vincent Herbet, Gav Beats; written by Vincent Herbert, Gav Beats, Chris, Andre Merritt)
12. "Just a Fool" – 4:05 (written and produced by Shane Tsurugi)
13. "Kung Paano" – 4:25 (produced and written by Vehnee A. Saturno)
14. "If Ever I See Heaven Again" – 4:14 (produced by Peter Stengaard; written and music by Diane Warren)

=== Asian re-released, repackaged edition release ===
==== Disc 1 ====
1. "Excuses" – 4:11 (produced by Vincent Herbert; written by Makeba Riddick, Vincent Herbert, Gav Beats)
2. "All I Need" (feat. Fatman Scoop) – 3:17 (original remix produced by Sean "Puffy" Combs, Alex Mejia, N8; written by Ashford/Simpson)
3. "Sana Lagi" – 3:47 (produced by Ito Rapadas; written by Ito Rapadas, John Barnard Borja)
4. "DJ Don't Quit" – 3:42 (produced by N8, Alex Meija; written by Tavia Ivey, Devin Nimmers, Derric Nimmers, Nathan V. Walton)
5. "Once Again" (feat. South Border) – 4:25 (produced by Jay Durias; written by Jay Durias, Sharon Inductivo)
6. "What U Do to Me" – 2:56 (produced by Vincent Herbert and Gav Beats; written by Makeba Riddick, Vincent Herbert, Gav Beats)
7. "Can't Hold Back" – 4:24 (written and produced by 3AM)
8. "Lose Control" – 2:30 (produced and written by DJ MOD)
9. "Don't Go" – 3:37 (produced by Vincent Herbert, Gav Beats; written by Vincent Herbert, Gav Beats, Chris, Andre Merritt, Cory "Co-P" Peterson)
10. "Inseparable" (new mix) – 2:39 (produced by Ito Rapadas; written by Jackson Charles Henry Jr.)
11. "I Still Luv You" – 3:31 (produced by Vincent Herbet, Gav Beats; written by Vincent Herbert, Gav Beats, Chris, Andre Merritt)
12. "Just a Fool" – 4:05 (written and produced by Shane Tsurugi)
13. "Kung Paano" – 4:25 (produced and written by Vehnee A. Saturno)
14. "If Ever I See Heaven Again" – 4:14 (produced by Peter Stengaard; written and music by Diane Warren)

==== Disc 2 ====
1. "Sana Lagi" (music video, directed by Jeffrey Tan)
2. "Kung Paano" (music video)
3. "I'd Rather" (originally sung by Luther Vandross)
4. "Too Many Walls" (originally sung by Cathy Dennis)
5. "I'll Never Get Over You (Getting Over Me)" (originally sung by Exposé)

== Personnel ==
- Jasmine Trias – primary artist
- Uriah Duffy – bass
- Vernon "Ice" Black – guitar
- Debbie Hammond – US executive producer, US A&R executive
- Gary "Sugar Foot" Greenberg – drums, US executive producer
- Tavia Ivey – background vocals
- Vincent Herbert – producer
- Peter Stengaard – producer, engineer, instrumentation
- Alex Mejia – producer, vocal producer, vocal tracking, US A&R executive
- Paul Foley – engineer
- Dexter Browne – US photograph
- Phat EFX – US photograph, US artwork
- Aloha Music International – US distribution
- Kathleen Dy-Go – Philippine executive producer
- DJ MOD – PH producer
- Ito Rapadas – PH producer
- Vehnee Saturno – PH producer
- Mark Nicdao – PH photograph
- Rosario Herrera – PH stylist
- Beinzi Balao – PH logo design
- Jay Saturnino Lumboy – PH album design and layout
- Universal Records – PH marketing and distribution

== Accolades ==
Year	Award-giving Body	Award	Result
2006	MTV Pilipinas Video Music Awards	Favorite Hip-Hop/R&B Video ("Lose Control")	Nominated
2006	Mobile MYX Top Picks	Ringtone of the Week (May) ("Kung Paano")	Won
2006	The Hawaii Academy of Recording Arts Na Hoku Hanohano Awards	Female Vocalist of the Year	Nominated
2006	The Hawaii Academy of Recording Arts Na Hoku Hanohano Awards	Most Promising Artist of the Year	Nominated
2006	The Hawaii Academy of Recording Arts Na Hoku Hanohano Awards	Contemporary Album of the Year	Nominated
2006	PARI's Awit Awards (the Philippine Grammy Awards)	Best R&B Song ("Lose Control")	Nominated
2006	PARI's Awit Awards (the Philippine Grammy Awards)	Best Vocal Arrangement ("Lose Control")	Nominated
2006	Hawaii Music Awards	Pop Album of the Year	Won
2006	Hawaii Music Awards	Best New Artist of the Year	Won
2006	Philippine Hip-Hop Music Awards	Female R&B Artist of the Year	Won
2005	Askmen.com	Singer of the Week (January)	Won
2005	AlohaJoe.com	Artist of the Month (August)	Won

== Charts and certifications ==
=== Weekly charts ===
Chart (2005)	Peak Position
U.S. Billboard Top Heatseekers	11
U.S. Billboard Independent Albums	20

=== Certifications ===
- Summer 2006 – PARI: Jasmine Trias (Asian Repackaged Edition) certified Platinum (30,000 copies shipped)
- February 2006 – PARI: Jasmine Trias (Philippine Import) certified Gold (15,000 copies shipped)
