= Honoré Commeurec =

French politician and activist

Honoré Commeurec (12 December 1878 - 13 February 1945) was a French typographer, union activist, printing cooperative leader, city councillor, politician and resistance member. He was arrested during the Vichy government, tortured and transported by the Nazis to Neuengamme concentration camp in Hamburg, where he died.

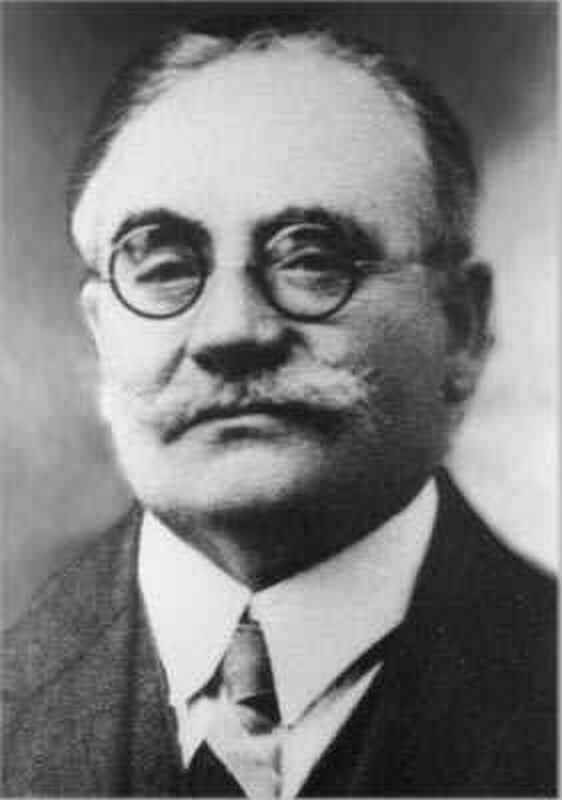
Honoré Commeurec, c.1935

== Biography ==
He was born in Rennes to Marie Lavigne, a labourer, and François Marie Commeurec, a shoemaker. They married a few days after he was born. He gained his higher primary certificate at school and apprenticed as a typographer from age 12 at the long-established Caillot printers, publisher of L'Avenir d'Ille-et-Vilane. On 1 March 1899, he joined the 78th section of the Fédération du Livre union, becoming its secretary. On 16 October 1903, he married his cousin, Marie Boucherie. In 1904, he joined Oberthür printers in Rennes, which served several public bodies including the Postes, télégraphes et téléphones (France). In 1905, his wife Marie gave birth to a son - also named Honoré. After the 1906 campaign for a nine-hour working day, the council of Ille-et-Vilane voted through a change in tendering practices: organisations providing services to the council must adhere to the new Millerand-Colliard law for working hours. Commeurec protested because some local printers, whose services were previously selected through an auction process, were against this. Oberthür, the usual supplier, ignored this so Commeurec managed to get the contract terminated. In retaliation, the company sacked him and ten of his colleagues in 1908. That year, he was one of six socialists elected to Rennes city council (he was a municipal councillor until 1935). He worked briefly at Saffray printers in Fougères and then the Arts et Manufactures printers in Rennes under the leadership of M. Crépin-Leblond, who became his friend. His wife died in 1909. In 1910, with some colleagues, he founded a workers' production cooperative in Rennes, L’Imprimerie nouvelle. On 10 September 1910, he married a primary-school teacher, Julia Délalandes. In 1911, he was one of the founders of the Maison du Peuple in Rennes. In 1913, he was a socialist candidate for the canton of Rennes south-east. He was the deputy secretary of the Rennes Section française de l'Internationale ouvrière (SFIO) (French Section of the Workers' International) in 1914. He was a socialist candidate in the legislative elections of 1914 for Saint-Malo. When World War I began his military service at Guingamp. He was at the front throughout the war in the 75e régiment territorial and was taken prisoner by the Germans in September 1918.

After the war ended, Crépin-Leblond retired and sold his company to eleven former co-operative staff of L’Imprimerie nouvelle. The new co-operative, with Commeurec as director (until his arrest in 1944), was renamed Imprimies Reunités. The Semeur d'Ille-et-vilaine and the Aurore d'Ille-et-Vilaine (paper of the SFIO from 1922) were edited at the co-operative (Commeurec was the manager of the newspaper from 1926 to 1928). He was a socialist candidate again in 1928 for the canton of Rennes north-west. In 1934, he was elected as district councillor for the canton of Rennes south-west. He continued his union work with the Confédération générale du travail committees and in particular that of the Semeur d'Ille-et-vilaine. He was president of the Chambre syndicale des ouvriers du livre de Rennes, a leader of the mouvement coopératif ouvrier, administrator of the Fédération nationale des coopératives de France and president of the Fédération des coopératives de l’Ouest.

After the armistice of 1940, Imprimies Reunites was a centre of the French Resistance in Rennes, printing and distributing underground papers as part of Libération Nord, including Libération, le Patriote, la Flamme and le Populaire (the latter had been a daily until the German invasion but was printed clandestinely from 1942). Commeurec was the leader of the socialist party in Rennes. From 1941, he made false documents for escaped soldiers with the typographer Marcel Besnard, from models by Gache and Dehalay. In August 1943, he became liaison officer for the Bordeaux-Loupiac network having been recruited by André Heurtier. He was chairman of the departmental Clandestine Liberation Committee and retrieved weapons parachuted in by the British. On 8 February 1944 he was arrested by the Gestapo and tortured at Jacques-Cartier prison. On 29 June, he was transferred to Fronstalag-122 internment camp at Royallieu-Compiègne and then taken from France with 147 others to the Neuengamme concentration camp network centred in south-eastern Hamburg on Transport No. 415. He was given the registration number 40160. On 13 February 1945, he died of exhaustion aged 66 at Stalag X-B, a satellite camp of Neuengamme at Sandbostel, where prisoners suffering from epidemics were often taken. His body was repatriated and reinterred in 1946 at the Cimetière du Nord in Rennes.

== Legacy ==
The city of Rennes honoured their son in July 1949 by renaming the Place de la Halle-aux-Blés to Place Honoré Commeurec in July. He was posthumously awarded the médaille de la résistance and made a knight of the légion d'honneur. He was recognised by decree as "Dead for France". His friend, fellow Rennes deputy and resister Albért Aubry, who was also transported to Neuengamme but survived, insisted that his eulogy be printed by Imprimies Reunités.
