= Victor Fung (businessman) =

Hong Kong–American businessman (born 1945)

The Honourable Victor Fung Kwok-king GBM GBS CBE
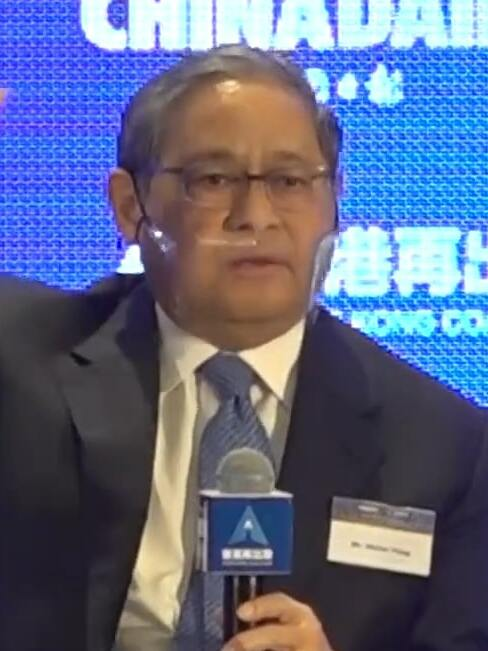
- Born: Fung Kwok-king; 16 October 1945 (age 81); British Hong Kong
- Citizenship: United States
- Education: Massachusetts Institute of Technology; Harvard School of Business
- Occupations: Engineer, businessman
- Spouse: Julia Shen Nai-kee
- Children: 3
- Parents: Fung Hon-chu (father); Lee Pui-yiu (mother)
- Relatives: William Fung (brother)

Chinese name
- Traditional Chinese: 馮國經
- Simplified Chinese: 冯国经
Transcriptions
Standard Mandarin
- Hanyu Pinyin: Féng Guójīng
Yue: Cantonese
- Jyutping: fung4 gwok3 ging1

Victor Fung Kwok-king GBM GBS CBE (Chinese: 馮國經; Jyutping: fung^{4} gwok^{3} ging^{1}; sometimes Victor K. Fung; born 16 October 1945) is the Group Chairman of Li & Fung group of companies. Together with his brother William, he owns a controlling stake of 32% in the business, which was founded by his grandfather.

He has held a number of public and other offices, including chairman of the Airport Authority Hong Kong, Hong Kong University Council and the Greater Pearl River Delta Business Council. The University of Hong Kong conferred an honorary Doctor of Laws degree on him in 1997, declaring "Our community has no dearth of captains of commerce; in Dr Victor Fung Kwok-king we have a veritable admiral or five-stargeneral of commerce and entrepreneurship."

== Education ==
Fung has Bachelor of Science and Master of Science degrees in electrical engineering from MIT. After earning a PhD in business economics from Harvard Business School, he stayed there as a professor of finance. For his early education, he enrolled in King George V School in Hong Kong.

Fung was the eldest son of Fung Hon Chu and his mother, Lee Pui Yiu, was a prominent member of the Western District Women's Welfare Association. Fung was the third generation of the Fung family in the Li & Fung Group. He attended the Primary Section of Ling Fung Secondary School in Happy Valley (he entered Primary One in 1951, which was opened in 1951) and graduated from King George V School (Secondary Section) in 1962. He passed the University of London Entrance Examination in 1962, obtaining a distinction in six out of nine subjects and a good grade in three subjects; he went to the Massachusetts Institute of Technology from the same year onwards for a Bachelor's Degree in Industrial Management, and obtained a Master's Degree in Electrical Engineering in 1966. In 1966, he obtained a Master's degree in Electrical Engineering. In 1970, he obtained a PhD in Business Economics from Harvard University, where he was a professor, and returned to Hong Kong in 1974 to join the family-owned Li & Fung Group.

== Career ==
Victor Fung became Group Chairman of Li & Fung Group, and his brother William Fung Kwok-lun the Group managing director. The business was founded by their grandfather, Fung Pak-liu, in 1906 and subsequently led by their father, Fung Hon-chu.

Fung is chairman of the Hong Kong-Japan Business Co-operation Committee and co-chair of France-based The Evian Group at IMD forum and think tank. He has been chairman since 2008 of the International Chamber of Commerce. He was formerly chairman of the Hong Kong Trade Development Council (1991–2000) and chairman of Airport Authority.

In 2008, Fung was appointed by Donald Tsang, the Chief Executive of Hong Kong, to be the member of "Task Force on Economic Challenges" to evaluate the situation and identify new opportunities during the 2008 financial crisis. The company laid off employees to cut costs, for which he was publicly criticised.

== Personal life ==
Fung is married with three children and holds American citizenship.

== See also ==
- William Fung
- Antony Leung
- Politics of Hong Kong
- Executive Council of Hong Kong

Political offices
Preceded by Lydia Dunn	Chairman of the Hong Kong Trade Development Council; 1991–2000	Succeeded by Peter Woo
Political offices
Preceded by Wong Po-yan	Chairman of the Hong Kong Airport Authority; 1999–2008	Succeeded by Marvin Cheung
Academic offices
Preceded by Dr T. L. Yang	Chairman of the Council of the University of Hong Kong; 2001–2009	Succeeded by Dr Leong Che-hung
