= Global Brands Group =

Chinese apparel, footwear, brand management company

Global Brands Group Holding Limited
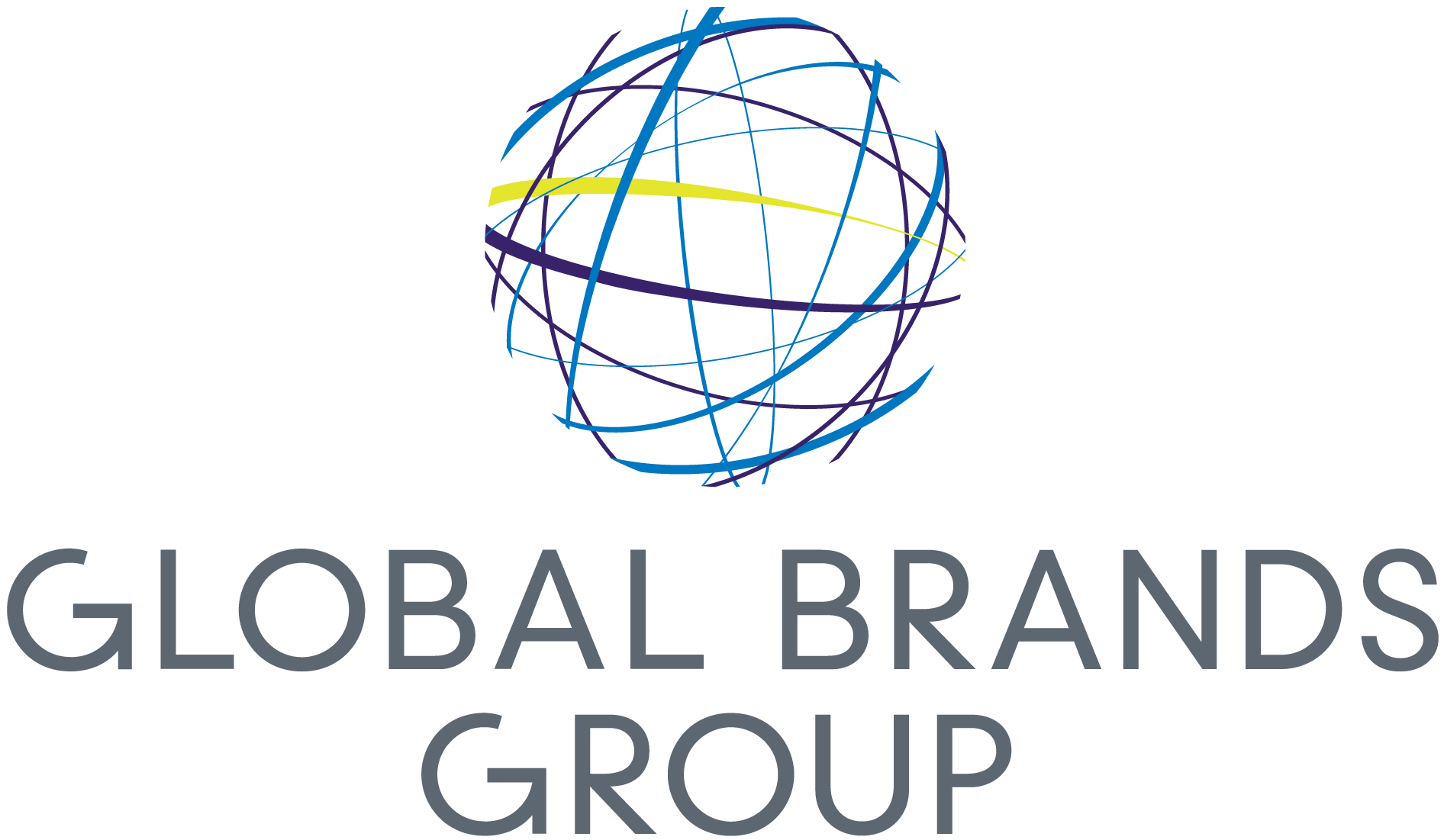
- Native name: 利標品牌有限公司
- Type: Public company
- Traded as: SEHK: 787
- Industry: Consumer
- Founded: December 2013
- Founder: William Fung
- Headquarters: Hong Kong
- Area served: Global
- Key people: Chairman: William Fung; CEO: Richard Nixon Darling
- Products: Apparel, Footwear, Accessories and Brand Management.
- Number of employees: Approximately 2,000
- Parent: The Fung Group
- Website: www.globalbrandsgroup.com

Global Brands Group Holding Limited (Chinese: 利標品牌有限公司) is a bankrupt holding company that has its own brand of apparel and footwear, as well as being a brand management company.

The company designed, developed, marketed and sold products under a diverse array of owned and licensed brands, such as Spyder.

In June 2021, despite a series of asset sales, the company's liabilities still exceeded its asset value. Trading in the shares of the entity was halted by the Hong Kong Stock Exchange due to its inability to file annual results. In 2022 Creative Artists Agency took full ownership of CAA-GBG Global Brand Management Group.

== Background ==
Global Brands Group was founded in 2005 when Li & Fung Limited established a wholesale business focusing on private label and branded apparel in order to broaden its relationships with existing and new retailer customers. On December 4, 2013, in preparation for the spin-off from Li & Fung and Listing, Global Brands Group was incorporated in Bermuda. On 1 December 13, 2013, it became a wholly owned subsidiary of Li & Fung.

On July 9, 2014, Global Brands Group was listed on the Main Board of the Hong Kong Stock Exchange by way of introduction as a result of a spin-off from Li & Fung. Its business is now separate and independent from Li & Fung's trading and logistics businesses.

On December 3, 2014, Global Brands Group, together with David Beckham, announced the launch of a joint venture, Seven Global, to drive the continued development of all consumer product categories around David Beckham.

On June 15, 2016, Global Brands announced a joint brand management business venture with Creative Artists Agency, called CAA-GBG, which instantly became global but would post serious financial losses in subsequent years.

On September 7, 2016, Global Brands announced a new joint venture with Katy Perry to expand the Katy Perry brand into new consumer product categories with footwear being the first category to launch.

In October 2018, Bruce Rockowitz stepped down as CEO after the sale of the company's North American assets to Nasdaq-listed Differential Brands Group at US$1.2 billion. Richard Nixon Darling was appointed CEO and presided over the beginning of the end of the company.

In 2020 the company posted a loss of US$584 million, up nearly US$200 million from US$388 million in 2019. The board has allowed CEO Richard Nixon Darling's remuneration to increase more than 12-fold during this period, from US$516,000 in 2019 to US$6,592,000 in 2020.

On June 17, 2021, the sale of Spyder to a Korean investor netting US$19.5 million was completed but at the same time the company issued a warning to investors over its ability to continue to trade.

On July 21, 2021, trading on the Hong Kong stock exchange was halted after the company was unable to submit its year-end results. Its shares were at HKD 0.189 at the time of suspension, equating to a market capitalization of HKD 194.4 million, or about $25 million.

On July 29, 2021, GBG USA initiated voluntary Chapter 11 proceedings and put its apparel and footwear brands up for sale with help from a $16 million bankruptcy loan. It owed $6 million to Kenneth Cole in unsecured trade debt, roughly $3.6 million to ABG, $2 million to Sequential Brands, and $860,000 to Marquee Brands. The company has a $17.3 million stalking horse bid for its Aquatalia brand and is also looking to sell "a substantial portion of its remaining assets" in bankruptcy, including Ely & Walker, Airband, MagnaReady, Yarrow, B New York, and Juniper unltd. The bankruptcy comes after the company sold off assets and inventory related to the Frye and Spyder brands. The brands' owner, Authentic Brands, recently reassigned those licenses to new operating partners.

In 2022, Creative Artists Agency took full ownership of CAA-GBG Global Brand Management Group.

== Management ==
- William Fung (chairman)
