= Li & Fung =

Supply Chain Management Company

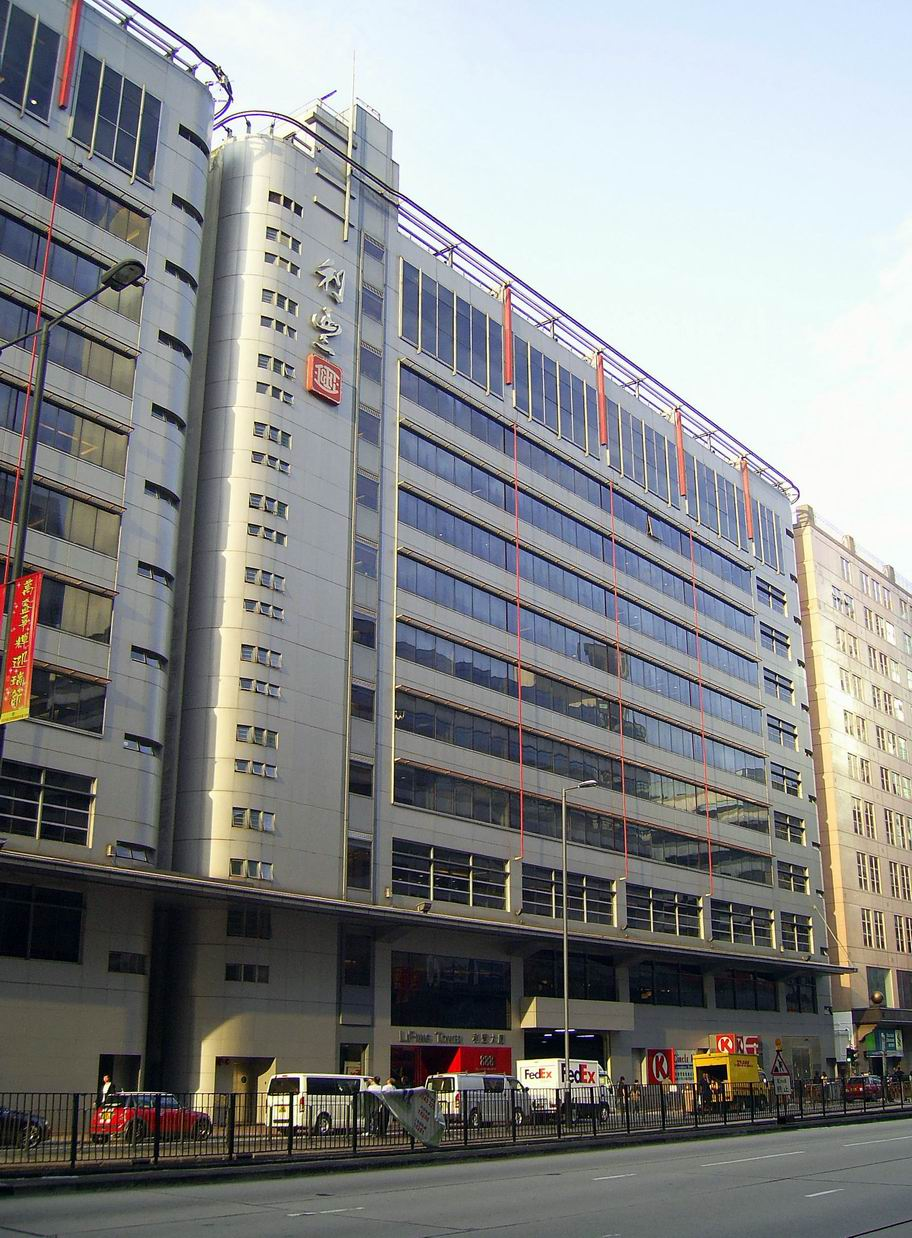
- Lifung Tower in Cheung Sha Wan in November 2008, the head office
- Type: Private
- Industry: Supply chain management
- Founded: 1906; 120 years ago
- Founder: Fung Pak-liu(馮柏燎) and Li To-ming(李道明) (Li&Fung)
- Headquarters: Hong Kong
- Key people: Spencer Fung, Group Executive Chairman; Joseph Phi, Group CEO; Ed Lam, Board Director, Li & Fung; CEO, LFX
- Products: Apparel, household goods, furnishings, toys, health and beauty products
- Revenue: $11.413 billion (2019)

Chinese name
- Traditional Chinese: 利豐公司
- Simplified Chinese: 利丰公司
Transcriptions
Standard Mandarin
- Hanyu Pinyin: Lì fēng gōngsī
Yue: Cantonese
- Jyutping: Lei6 fung1 gung1 si1
- Website: www.lifung.com

Li & Fung Limited is a Hong Kong–based supply chain management company. Established in 1906, the company became publicly traded in 1973 and has since played a significant role in manufacturing apparel, toys, and various consumer goods for major North American and European retailers. Significant growth occurred after its public listing, reaching a peak market capitalization in 2011, but the rise of platforms like Alibaba and Amazon, which directly connect manufacturers with consumers, created an increasingly challenging environment for the company.

In response to challenges, including the US–China trade tensions and the COVID-19 pandemic, Li & Fung announced privatization plans in March 2020 and was subsequently delisted from the Hong Kong Stock Exchange. The move was aimed at expediting the restructuring and technology investments needed to adapt to the changing market.

Founded by Fung Pak-liu and Li To-ming, the company initially engaged in exporting porcelain before diversifying into other products and establishing itself as an exporter from Hong Kong in the 1970s. The company evolved from a traditional broker to offering services from design to logistics.

Throughout the 1990s and 2000s, Li & Fung pursued an aggressive acquisition strategy, significantly expanding its global presence and service offerings. This period of rapid expansion was followed by a strategic focus on core competencies in sourcing, trading, and logistics in the 2010s, in response to the shifting retail landscape and the challenges posed by e-commerce. The establishment of LFX in 2021 marked Li & Fung's continued adaptation to the digital era.

Throughout its history, Li & Fung has navigated through various criticisms and controversies, including labor issues and challenges related to its growth strategy. Notably, the company has engaged in initiatives to improve factory safety standards and working conditions, particularly in the aftermath of incidents in Bangladesh. Amid its strategic development, the company has also faced allegations of non-payment to suppliers. Despite these challenges, Li & Fung remains a key player in the global supply chain management sector, continuously adapting to the ever-changing landscape of global trade and retail.

== History ==
=== 1906–1970: Founding and the early years ===
Li & Fung was founded in 1906 in Guangzhou by Fung Pak-liu, an English teacher, and Li To-ming, a local merchant whose family owned a porcelain shop. The company name, derived from the founders' surnames, signifies "profit" (Li) and "plentiful" (Fung), reflecting the founders' aspirations. During the early 1900s, Li & Fung emerged as the first company in the export sector to be entirely owned by Chinese stakeholders.

Initially focusing on porcelain, the company diversified into fireworks, jade, and ivory handicrafts, and silk, targeting the US market through a partnership with Ignaz Strauss & Company, a New York–based sourcing agent for upscale retailers.

In 1937, the company expanded into British Hong Kong, establishing its first branch office outside mainland China. Despite Li divesting his shares in 1946, the company retained its original name despite prevalent regional corporate norms. Shortly after, the Guangzhou branch was closed, and the employees were relocated to the company's main office in Hong Kong. By the late 1940s, Li & Fung was responsible for exporting 30% of Hong Kong's rattan furniture.

The 1950s brought significant changes with the United Nations trade embargo on China, promoting Hong Kong's shift to manufacturing textiles, plastics, electronics, clocks, watches, and toys. This shift was fueled by industrialists from mainland China who brought technology and capital, alongside factors such as an influx of mainland Chinese, low taxation, economic stability, minimal restrictions, and a port infrastructure catalyzed the burgeoning export sector. The textile industry, in particular, saw rapid growth, making Hong Kong a leading exporter of textiles by the 1960s. Despite the societal challenges that surfaced in the mid-1960s, the export sector, including, Li & Fung's garment export business, continued to thrive, solidifying the company's position as a key player.

=== 1970–1989: The first public listing ===
During the late 1960s and early 1970s, Li & Fung's main competitors were British firms Dodwell & Co. and the Swire Group. Targeting the USA market, the company achieved a notable growth rate of 28% from 1969 to 1973.

William and Victor Fung, the sons of Fung Hon-chu, joined the company after completing their education at Harvard University – William with his MBA in 1972 and Victor with his doctorate in 1973. They soon restructured the company by establishing Li & Fung, Ltd with six subsidiaries.

In April 1973, Li & Fung went public, listing on the Hong Kong Stock Exchange. However, the 1973 Organization of Arab Petroleum Exporting Countries (OAPEC) oil embargo on the United States triggered a global recession that lasted through 1975, adversely affecting Li & Fung's financial performance until a recovery in 1976.

In the 1970s, Western retailers began importing directly from Asian manufacturers. In response, Li & Fung shifted from playing the traditional broker role to becoming a manufacturing partner. The strategic pivot involved offering services that included design, identifying suppliers for fabrics and manufacturing, inspection, packaging, and logistics, boosting the company's standing among Western retailers and with suppliers in China. By the early 1980s, Li & Fung's clientele included The Gap and The Limited, with the company also serving as a distributor of handbags, belts, shoes, scarves, and other fashion accessories from Korea, Thailand, and Taiwan.

The late 1980s marked Li & Fung's entry into the toy industry and retail, adopting its supply chain model in collaboration with Toys R’ Us. Li & Fung's diversification continued across other sectors such as real estate, warehousing, shipping, finance, and insurance through strategic joint ventures, acquisitions, and investments.

In May1987, the Gap, a major client, established a merchandising office in Hong Kong. On October 19, 1987, stock markets around the world crashed, highlighting the interconnectedness of financial markets. Amid these setbacks, Li & Fung moved to privatize the company; the management buyout was completed in January 1989.

=== 1990s–2013: The second public listing: Growth through acquisitions ===
Li & Fung's decision to go public in 1973 was aimed at enabling family members to gain financially from the company's success without direct involvement in its operations, while still retaining the majority of the shares (75%). In 1989, the Fung Brothers initiated a management buyout to privatize the company, a move intended to consolidate control and cultivate a corporate environment that would attract and retain talent.

The same year marked the introduction of the Three Year Plan, where executives set three-year goals reflecting the anticipated business environment. This strategic planning framework was designed to maintain consistent objectives, even as tactics might adapt over time. A Harvard Business School study in 2014 posited that this strategy may have led to the acquisition of underperforming companies, noting that Li & Fung acquired approximately 50 companies between 2008 and 2013.

Following its relisting on the Hong Kong Stock Exchange in 1992, under the leadership of the Fung Brothers, Li & Fung embarked on a series of strategic acquisitions aimed at expanding its global footprint and service offerings. This included the acquisition of Inchcape Buying Services (formerly known as Dodwell & Co.), a UK-based sourcing company, in 1995, which extended Li & Fung's sourcing network to the Indian subcontinent, the Mediterranean, and the Caribbean. In 1999, Li & Fung acquired two of its major competitors: Swire & Maclaine, a UK-based logistics company, and Camberley Enterprises.

Further expansion through acquisitions continued through the early 2000s, such as the purchase of the Colby Group, and the appointment of Bruce Rockowitz, to the board of directors, later becoming president of Li & Fung (Trading) Limited, the Group's principal trading subsidiary. The company further diversified its portfolio through acquisitions in various sectors, including fashion, logistics, and retail, notably acquiring Tommy Hilfiger's global sourcing operations in 2007.

Li & Fung's aggressive acquisition strategy was supported through various financial strategies, including share placements and investments from significant shareholders like Temasek Holdings, which bought 4.62% of Li & Fung for HK$3.88 billion, enabling the company to fund more acquisitions.

=== 2014–2019: Transition, digitalization, and market challenges ===
The global retail landscape revolution that began in 2010 intensified in the latter half of the decade. The rapid expansion of e-commerce and changes in consumer behavior led to rapid shifts. The period, referred to by some as the "retail apocalypse" saw traditional retail facing unprecedented challenges. In response, Li & Fung embarked on a series of strategic moves and investments in technology. Nonetheless, the impact on Li & Fung's business led to a 95% loss in market value between 2011 and 2020.

In 2014, Spencer Fung was appointed Group CEO, succeeding Victor Fung, with Marc Compagnon taking on the role of Group President. That year, Li & Fung executed a strategic division of its operations, spinning off its global brands and licensing business through a stock split. Bruce Rockowitz assumed the role of Chief Executive for the newly independent Global Brands Group, listed on the Hong Kong Stock Exchange in July 2014. The move was aimed at focusing on the company's core competencies in sourcing, trading, and logistics, a pivot from the company's previous growth strategy focused on mergers and acquisitions.

To expand its logistics operations, in 2014, the company acquired China Container Line, a freight forwarding company. In 2015, Li & Fung sought to expand its retail presence in China through a joint venture with Beijing Wangfujing Department Store Group Co. Ltd. and Shanghai Bailian Group Co. Ltd., with plans to open 300 stores. In 2016, Li & Fung divested its LF Asia Distribution, its consumer and healthcare distribution business, to Dah Chong Hong for US$350 million. By the end of the company's 2014-2016 strategic plan, the company experienced a decline in revenue and profit for three consecutive years with a notable 47% decrease in profit in 2016.

In 2017, following its removal from the Hang Seng Index, Li & Fung sold three business units—Whalen, Cobalt Fashion, and MEIYUME—to Hony Capital for $1.1 billion, a transaction that involved substantial write-downs and an accounting loss of US$610 million.

The years 2018 and 2019 witnessed a downturn in Li & Fung's core operating profit, with a 20% reduction in 2018, exacerbated by a 22% decline in 2019 due to store closures, customer bankruptcies, and margin pressures. Despite these challenges, in 2019, Singapore-based Temasek Holdings invested US$300 million for a 21.7% stake in LF Logistics, valuing the company at an estimated US$1.38 billion. Concurrently, the market capitalization of Li & Fung was around US$1.25 billion.

=== Since 2020: Navigating challenges and strategic transformations ===
In 2020, the Fung Family completed the privatization of Li & Fung, acquiring it at a value notably lower than its historical peak. This transition was followed by a comprehensive restructuring of the company, which involved a significant reduction in its global workforce. These layoffs led to public protests and allegations of unlawful dismissals, as reported by several sources. Subsequently, Li & Fung received a US$100 million investment from the e-commerce giant, JD.com, signaling a strategic partnership and financial reinforcement.

In April 2021, a separate and new company called LFX was announced with the CFO of Li & Fung taking the helm in the new company. The new company would focus on offering digital services across the consumer goods supply chain.

In December 2021, LF Logistics, a subsidiary of Li & Fung, was acquired by the global container shipping company Maersk for US$3.6 billion in an all-cash transaction. This deal raised questions among some of Li & Fung's former minority shareholders, who sought an investigation by the Securities and Futures Commission into the sale's valuation, which was substantially higher than the valuation at which Li & Fung was privatized.

In September 2022, Moody's Investors Service announced a review of Li & Fung Limited's credit rating for a potential downgrade. More recently, S&P Global Ratings affirmed its 'BB' credit rating in April 2025, noting improving EBITDA, strong cash reserves, and strategic progress in realigning the business toward more stable and diversified channels.

== Charity ==
=== Li & Fung Foundation ===
The Li & Fung Foundation, originally established as the Fung Foundation in 2006 on the centennial of its parent company, has been an active contributor to the communities where the Fung Group operates. The foundation's charter is to promote sustainable development and improve the lives of the individuals in these communities. With a focus on education, healthcare, and environmental sustainability, the foundation has been instrumental in supporting a wide range of global organizations and initiatives.

Since its inception, the foundation has engaged in a wide array of philanthropic activities, supporting numerous organizations worldwide. Notable partnerships include the Asian University for Women (AUW), Business for Social Responsibility (BSR), Captivating International, Crossroads, Habitat for Humanity, Junior Achievement, Movember Foundation, Red Cross/Red Crescent, Room to Read, The Women's Foundation (TWF), World Vision, World Wide Fund for Nature, and various cancer research funds.

Specific educational initiatives sponsored by the foundation include:

- The establishment of a $100 million scholarship in 2006 to support up to 100 Hong Kong undergraduates to study abroad and students from mainland China to study in Hong Kong.
- Collaboration with Captivating International, a Hong Kong–based charity that focuses on helping schools that serve children living in poverty. Through this partnership, the Li & Fung Foundation provided sewing machines and matched employee contributions to the Seng Girls Vocation School Program in Tibet, enabling the school to teach girls how to make clothes and bags.
- Partnering with the Cambodian Children's Fund whose mission is to transform the lives of impoverished children through education.
- Supporting House of Heart to provide shelter for abandoned children and education for impoverished women.

The foundation also provides disaster relief through the Red Cross and UNICEF, and supporting the annual "Get Redressed Month," Hong Kong's largest clothing drive that aims to create awareness for fashion waste.

Central to the Li & Fung Foundation's strategy is its commitment to partnering with local charities that share its mission.

=== Victor & William Fung Foundation ===
A separate philanthropic organization, the Victor & William Fung Foundation promotes leadership through scholarships and fellowships. The Fung Scholars program supports more than 6,000 scholars and fellows across 31 universities worldwide.

=== COVID-19 response ===
In February 2020, in response to widespread shortages, Circle K stores gave away 100,000 surgical masks to Hong Kong residents 65 years and older. Circle K at the time was operated by CRA Convenience Retail Asia Limited, a subsidiary of Li & Fung; the company sold its 340 Circle K stores in November 2020.

In June 2020, the Sourcing Journal reported a rumor that Li & Fung dismissed 70 Percent of procurement staff. The next day, the same publication reported that Li & Fung admitted that COVID-19's impact on global retail was forcing the company to adjust staffing levels but that the total percentage across all units in all countries wouldn't be anywhere near 70%.

== Criticism and controversies ==
=== Labor ===
In November 2012, a fire occurred at the Tazreen Fashions Factory in Bangladesh, resulting in the death of 112 workers. The factory's customers included Walmart, C&A, and Li & Fung. Following the incident, Li & Fung acknowledged having contracts with Tarzeen valued at $175,000 and committed to providing compensation of US$1200 to each of the victims' families. Additionally, the company also announced initiatives to support the affected families further, including the establishment of an education fund for the victims' children. In January 2014, the company announced it would provide factories with consulting services, financing, and insurance to help meet safety standards.

In 2013, the collapse of the Rana Plaza building, which housed five garment factories also led to loss of life. Li & Fung noted that it had neither operations nor orders with any of the factories located at Rana Plaza at the time of the collapse. The two incidents, however, drew global attention to the working conditions in the garment industry, particularly in Bangladesh, and highlighted the complex challenges of ensuring safety and fair labor practices in global supply chains.

In response to the growing concerns over safety standards in the garment industry, Li & Fung expanded their vendor compliance division with a Safety Task Force (STF) team comprising fire safety experts, electrical and structural engineers to inspect and upgrade their factories to global safety standards. They also became a signatory of the Accord and Alliance for Safety in Bangladesh RMG, initiatives aimed at improving factory conditions. These agreements were part of a collective effort by industry stakeholders to address systemic issues in the sector but ceased operations on December 31, 2018. Since many have forgotten about the incident, Li & Fung too is no longer signatory of the Accord and Alliance for Safety in Bangladesh RMG.

Criticism has been directed towards Li & Fung and similar companies over their negotiation practices, which some argue contribute to cost-cutting measures by factories that compromise safety and labor conditions. Additionally, activists have criticized the company for its role in perpetuating low wages in developing countries and for alleged shortcomings in conducting thorough inspections of factory conditions.

=== Financial ===
Li & Fung has faced criticism for its growth by acquisition strategy. A 2014 Financial Times opinion piece highlighted that from 2006 to 2014, the company's acquisition-related expenditures reached approximately US$7 billion. While revenue grew from US$4 billion to US$16 billion within this period, the increase in revenue was criticized as insufficient relative to the investments, noting only a 30% growth in the top line. Peter Guy of the South China Morning Post further criticized the company's strategy, suggesting that the anticipated synergies from acquisitions failed to materialize and advocated for a return to focusing on the core competencies of Li & Fung.

Concerns were also raised by SimplyWallSt in 2019 regarding the compensation of Li & Fung's CEO, suggesting that it was excessive compared to other executives in companies of similar market capitalization.

In 2020, the Inland Revenue Department of Hong Kong examined Li & Fung Trading (LFT) for two primary issues: The first concern was whether the profits derived from goods sourced outside of Hong Kong, mainland China, and Macau should be exempt from the profits tax. The second issue examined was whether the deduction of a marketing commission paid to its holding company in the British Virgin Islands from onshore profits violated anti-avoidance regulations stipulated in sections 61 and 61A of the Inland Revenue Ordinance. The Board of Review decided in Li & Fung's favor in the first issue, and for the Commissioner in the second; the case was settled.

On May 12, 2020, 97.1% of the minority shareholders approved of the company's privatization plan. Li & Fung Shareholders who opposed the deal filed a complaint with Hong Kong's Securities and Futures Commission (SFC) to investigate whether Li & Fung's May 12 shareholders meeting was conducted in accordance with regulations.

== See also ==
- List of trading companies
