= List of vice-chancellors of the University of Hong Kong =

This is a list of vice-chancellors of the University of Hong Kong.

No.	Portrait	President	Took office	Left office	Note
1		Sir Charles Eliot	1912	1918	
2		G. P. Jordan	1918	1921	Acting
3		Sir William Brunyate	7 April 1921	18 February 1924	
4		Sir William Hornell	18 February 1924	28 October 1937	
5		Duncan Sloss	28 October 1937	April; 1949	
6		Sir Lindsay Ride	April; 1949	November; 1964	
7		W. C. G. Knowles	19 November 1964	30 June 1965	
8		A. J. S. McFadzean	1965	1965	Acting
9		Kenneth Robinson	October; 1965	1972	
10		Rayson Huang	September; 1972	1986	Resigned and retired
11		Wang Gungwu	1986	1995	
12		Patrick Cheng	1996	6 September 2000	Resigned after Pollgate
13		Ian Rees Davies	10 November 2000	2002	Acting from July 2000
14		Tsui Lap-chee	1 September 2002	31 March 2014	
15		Sir Peter Mathieson	1 April 2014	31 January 2018	
–		Paul Tam	1 February 2018	16 July 2018	Acting
16		Xiang Zhang	17 July 2018	Incumbent	
