= Roland Chin =

Prof Roland T. Chin BBS, JP
- 錢大康

5th President and Vice-Chancellor of the Hong Kong Baptist University
- In office 1 September 2015 – 31 January 2021
- Chancellor: Leung Chun-ying; Carrie Lam
- Preceded by: Albert Chan
- Succeeded by: Alexander Wai

Provost and Deputy Vice-Chancellor of the University of Hong Kong
- In office 26 January 2010 – 3 July 2015
- President: Lap-Chee Tsui; Peter Mathieson
- Chancellor: Donald Tsang; Leung Chun-ying
- Provost: Clayton Mackenzie
- Preceded by: Richard Wong
- Succeeded by: Paul Tam

Vice-President for Academic Affairs (Deputy to the President) of the Hong Kong University of Science and Technology
- In office 1 September 2006 – 26 January 2010; Acting until 10 September 2007
- President: Chu Ching-wu; Tony F. Chan
- Chancellor: Donald Tsang; Leung Chun-ying
- Preceded by: Yuk Shee Chan
- Succeeded by: Shiu-Yuen Cheng (Acting); Wei Shyy

Vice-President for Research and Development of the Hong Kong University of Science and Technology
- In office June 2003 – 1 September 2006
- Preceded by: Otto C.C. Lin
- Succeeded by: Tony Eastham

Personal details
- Born: 1952 (age 73–74) Macao
- Education: University of Missouri

Professor Roland Chin Tai-hong, BBS, JP (Chinese: 錢大康; born 1952) is a former President of the Hong Kong Baptist University (HKBU). Before that he was the Provost and Deputy Vice-Chancellor as well as the Chair Professor of Computer Science in the University of Hong Kong (HKU).

== Career ==
After receiving the bachelor and PhD degrees specialising in Electrical Engineering at the University of Missouri, Columbia in 1975 and 1979 respectively, Chin had spent two years in the Goddard Space Flight Center of NASA in Greenbelt, Maryland. He subsequently pursued a teaching career and commenced it at the Department of Electrical and Computer Engineering in the University of Wisconsin–Madison in Madison, Wisconsin where he had stayed for about one and a half decade from 1981 to 1995.

Chin then served in Hong Kong and joined the Hong Kong University of Science and Technology (HKUST) as the Chair Professor of Computer Science at HKUST. With the course of time he started to undertake crucial role in the institution, getting to serve as Vice-President for Research and Development (2003–2006) and then as Deputy President and Provost (Acting: 2006–2007; Permanent: 2007–2010).

In 2010 he was unanimously agreed by the selection committee in the final stage to be appointed Provost and Deputy Vice-Chancellor of the University of Hong Kong.

In May 2015 he accepted the appointment at HKBU and assumed the office later in September that year after his provostship at HKU.
