= Richard Wong =

Hong Kong economist and academic administrator (born 1952)

Richard Wong SBS JP
- 王于漸
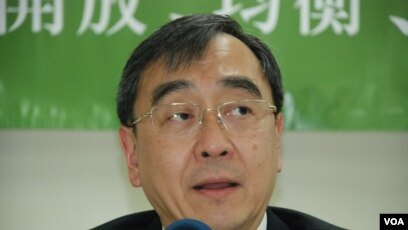

Provost and Deputy Vice-Chancellor of the University of Hong Kong
- Incumbent
- Assumed office 1 April 2019 (Note: Wong was moved to the post of Vice President and Pro-Vice-Chancellor (Institutional Advancement) from 28 May 2024. He was restored to the provostship by September 2024.)
- President: Xiang Zhang
- Preceded by: Paul Tam
- Succeeded by: Vivian Yam (Note: Yam served as Provost from 28 May 2024 to September 2024.)
- In office 12 June 2004 – 26 January 2010
- President: Lap-chee Tsui
- Preceded by: Cheung Yau Kai (acting, 2000)
- Succeeded by: Roland Chin

Dean of the Faculty of Business and Economics, the University of Hong Kong
- In office 2001–2007
- Preceded by: Position established
- Succeeded by: Gary C. Biddle

Director of the School of Business, the University of Hong Kong
- In office 1997–2001
- Preceded by: Position established
- Succeeded by: Eric C. Chang

Vice President and Pro-Vice-Chancellor (Institutional Advancement) of the University of Hong Kong
- In office 28 May 2024 – September 2024
- Preceded by: Norman Tien Chihnan (July 2021)

Personal details
- Born: 20 June 1952 (age 74) Shanghai, China
- Party: Path of Democracy
- Spouse: Jane Chan
- Children: 2
- Education: Tak Sun School; Wah Yan College, Kowloon
- Alma mater: University of Chicago (AB, AM, PhD)
- Occupation: Economist, educator, academic administrator

Richard Wong
- Chinese: 王于漸
Transcriptions

Richard Wong Yue-Chim SBS JP (Chinese: 王于漸; born 20 June 1952) is a Hong Kong economist, university professor, and academic administrator currently serving as Provost and Deputy Vice-Chancellor of the University of Hong Kong since 2019, a position he previously held from 2004 to 2010. Wong served as the founding dean of HKU's Faculty of Business and Economics from 2001 to 2007 and is Chair of Economics and Philip Wong Kennedy Wong Professor in Political Economy.

Prior to taking up the provostship for a second time in 2019, Wong was Head of the Hong Kong Academy of Politics and Public Policy, served on Path of Democracy's Board of Governors, was a member of a number of statutory bodies, and served as an advisor to Our Hong Kong Foundation, a pro-Beijing Hong Kong think tank.

== Early life and education ==
Wong was born in Shanghai and grew up in Hong Kong, where he attended Tak Sun School and Wah Yan College, Kowloon. After graduating, Wong attended the University of Chicago, where he was president of the university's Chinese students' association. He graduated with AB and AM degrees in economics in 1974.

== Academic career ==
=== Chinese University of Hong Kong ===
Wong returned to Hong Kong in 1976 to teach at the Department of Economics of the Chinese University of Hong Kong, initially as an Assistant Lecturer. He was subsequently promoted to Lecturer in 1981 after obtaining his PhD from the University of Chicago the same year. During his time at CUHK, Wong served as a member of the University Senate from 1981 to 1992, and as Dean of Students of New Asia College from 1981 to 1983. Wong actively participated in the founding of Shaw College, serving as a founding fellow and trustee of the College in the 1980s and 90s. Following his appointment as Senior Lecturer in 1987, Wong became a visiting fellow at the Hoover Institution on War, Revolution and Peace at Stanford University, and founded the Hong Kong Centre for Economic Research in 1988, where he remains Director.

=== University of Hong Kong ===
In 1992, Wong joined the School of Economics and Finance (now part of the Faculty of Business and Economics) of the University of Hong Kong as a reader, subsequently becoming a full professor in 1995.

In 1997, he was appointed Director of the newly founded School of Business, a merger of the former Department of Management Studies and the old Business School. When the School of Business was amalgamated with the School of Economics and Finance in 2001 to form the Faculty of Business and Economics, Wong went on to serve as its founding Dean, first in an acting capacity from 2001 until 2002, when he was formally appointed Dean. During his tenure, the School of Business introduced a series of new double-degree undergraduate programmes, including the Bachelor of Business Administration (Law) and Bachelor of Laws programme and the Bachelor of Engineering in Computer Science/Bachelor of Business Administration (Information Systems) programme. He served as a member of the university's governing council from 2003 to 2006.

Wong continued to serve as acting Dean until 2007 when he was appointed Provost and Deputy Vice-Chancellor in 2004. He retired from the provostship in 2010 and was appointed Philip Wong Kennedy Wong Professor in Political Economy in 2011.

In 2015, Wong unsuccessfully sought to return to the HKU Council, the university's governing body, losing the election by 179 votes.

Wong took up the provostship for a second time in April 2019, when he was appointed on an interim basis to succeed interim Provost Paul Tam, who had unexpectedly resigned. At the time of his appointment, staff and students expressed concern over his "pro-government" and "pro-China" stance, which they feared would affect the university's ability to defend its autonomy and freedom of speech. He was viewed as an "ally" and "right-hand man" of university president Zhang Xiang during his tenure, and later was simultaneously appointed as acting Executive Vice President (Administration and Finance) in January 2024 to take up the duties of Professor Wei Pan, who had resigned before completing his term.

==== HKU Council controversy ====
At a meeting of the HKU Council, HKU's governing body, on 28 May 2024, Council chairman Priscilla Wong bypassed President and Vice-Chancellor Zhang Xiang to reshuffle the university's senior management team, with Richard Wong moved to the lesser role of Vice President and Pro-Vice-Chancellor (Institutional Advancement). He was succeeded as Provost and Executive Vice President by Vivian Yam and Norman Tien respectively.

Following an intervention by John Lee, the Chief Executive of Hong Kong and the ex-officio chancellor of the university, a government task force was set up to handle the conflict, with Wong subsequently restored to his previous role of Provost and Deputy Vice-Chancellor in September 2024.

== Public service and politics ==
Wong has served as a member of many public bodies, including the University Grants Committee, the Exchange Fund Advisory Committee, the Housing Authority, the Industry and Technology Development Council, the Central Policy Unit, the Chief Executive's Commission on Innovation and Technology and the Hospital Authority.

Wong supported Tung Chee-hwa's re-election in 2002, and is known as a moderate pro-establishment figure. In 2015, Wong became an advisor to Our Hong Kong Foundation, a pro-Beijing think tank set up by former Chief Executive Tung Chee-Hwa. Wong was a "vocal critic" of the 2014 Occupy Central protests.

In 2018, Wong was one of 38 economists who issued a statement supporting the Lantau Tomorrow Vision reclamation project that Chief Executive Carrie Lam proposed in her October 2018 policy address.

== Honours and awards ==
- Justice of the Peace (2000)
- Silver Bauhinia Star for contributions to education, housing, industry and technology development (1999)

== Publications ==
- Fixing Inequality in Hong Kong, Hong Kong University Press, Hong Kong, February 2017
- Diversity and Occasional Anarchy: On Deep Economic and Social Contradictions in Hong Kong
- Hong Kong Land for Hong Kong People: Fixing the Failures of Our Housing Policy
