= Paul Tam =

Hong Kong surgeon

Professor Paul Tam Kwong-hang JP
- 譚廣亨

Provost and Deputy Vice-Chancellor of University of Hong Kong
- In office 3 July 2015 (Note: Acting period inclusive) – 1 April 2019
- President: Peter Mathieson; Himself (acting); Xiang Zhang
- Chancellor: Leung Chun-ying; Carrie Lam
- Preceded by: Roland Chin
- Succeeded by: Richard Wong (interim)

Acting Vice-Chancellor and President of University of Hong Kong
- In office 1 February 2018 – 16 July 2018
- Chancellor: Carrie Lam
- Chairman: Sir David Li
- Provost: Himself
- Preceded by: Peter Mathieson
- Succeeded by: Xiang Zhang

Personal details
- Children: 2 daughters
- Education: MBBS (HKU); FRCS (RC SEd); FRCS (RCPSG); FRCS (RCSI); ChM (ULIV); MA Status (Oxon.)
- Alma mater: University of Hong Kong
- Awards: Best paper for Basic Science
- Website: hub.hku.hk/

Paul Tam Kwong-hang JP (Chinese: 譚廣亨) is a Hong Kong surgeon who served as provost and deputy vice-chancellor of the University of Hong Kong (HKU) from 2015 to 2019. Before his provostship, Tam has been chair of paediatric surgery at the university since 1996 and Li Shu-Pui Professor in Surgery since 2013.

== Biography ==
=== Early career ===
Tam obtained his medical degree from the University of Hong Kong (HKU) in 1976. For the following ten years, he worked in the university's department of surgery, during which he received his FRCS qualifications in RC SEd, RCPSG and RCSI. He obtained his master of surgery degree at the University of Liverpool in 1984 and his master of arts at the University of Oxford in 1990. He also earned the qualifications of paediatricians at the Royal College of Paediatrics and Child Health. He then commenced his teaching career in the United Kingdom as senior lecturer at the University of Liverpool in 1986 to 1990 and subsequently as Reader and director of paediatric surgery at the University of Oxford in 1990 to 1996.

=== University of Hong Kong ===
In the 2000s, Tam became part of the senior management team at the HKU. He assumed the office of vice-president and pro-vice-chancellor (research) in 2003, overseeing the strategies and development regarding researches of HKU. He was appointed associate dean of the graduate school in 2010 and was successively promoted dean of graduate school in 2014. His successor, Nirmala Rao, took over the post on 1 May 2016.

== Academic achievement ==
Tam holds four patents and has authored over 700 publications. His internationally refereed journals have almost 20,000 citations.

=== Research interests ===
Tam specialises in developmental biology, paediatric surgery, immunology, and genomics.

== Awards and honours ==
- 30 June 2017: Justice of the Peace
- 2018: Asian Scientist 100, Asian Scientist

== External Websites ==
- HKU Scholars hub
