= Edward Chen =

Edward Chen may refer to:

- Edward Chen (actor) (born 1996), Taiwanese actor and singer
- Edward Chen (politician) (born 1945), Hong Kong politician and academic
- Edward M. Chen (born 1953), American federal judge
- Edward I-hsin Chen (1950–2022), Hong Kong-born Taiwanese politician and academic
- Eddy Chen (born 1993), a member of the duo TwoSet Violin
