= Peter Mathieson =

Peter Mathieson may refer to:

- Peter Mathieson (nephrologist) (born 1959), English nephrologist and Vice-Chancellor and Principal of the University of Edinburgh
- Peter Mathieson (swimmer) (1914–1986), New Zealand swimmer

== See also ==
- Peter Matheson (disambiguation)
- Peter Matthiessen (1927–2014), American novelist, naturalist
