= Chan Yuk-shee =

Professor Yuk-shee Chan SBS, BBS, JP

President of the Lingnan University
- In office 1 September 2007 – August 2013
- Preceded by: Edward Chen
- Succeeded by: Leonard Cheng

Vice-President for Academic Affairs of the University of Science and Technology
- In office 2001–2006
- Succeeded by: Roland Chin

Dean of the Business School of the University of Science and Technology
- In office 1993–2001
- Succeeded by: Ceajer Chan

Personal details
- Education: Chinese University of Hong Kong; University of California at Berkeley
- Occupation: Chair Professor of Finance (Lingnan); Professor Emeritus of the Business School (HKUST)

Professor Chan Yuk-shee, SBS, BBS, JP (Chinese: 陳玉樹) (1954 – 22 May 2017) was the President of Lingnan University of Hong Kong from September 2007 to August 2013. Prior to joining Lingnan University, he was the vice-president for Academic Affairs of the Hong Kong University of Science and Technology (HKUST).

Professor Chan received his BBA from The Chinese University of Hong Kong, and his MBA, MA and PhD from the University of California at Berkeley. He was an assistant professor and later associate professor of finance at the Kellogg School of Management of Northwestern University, and was Justin Dart Professor of Finance at USC's Marshall School of Business.

He returned to Hong Kong to help establish the business school of the HKUST in 1990. He was appointed the Founding Dean of the business school in 1993 and then the vice-president of Academic Affairs of the university in 2001.

He was awarded an Honorary Fellowship by the Open University of Hong Kong in 2006 and an Honorary Doctorate in Law (LLD) by the Hong Kong University of Science and Technology in 2012.
