= Leonard Cheng =

Prof Leonard K Cheng BBS, JP
- 鄭國漢
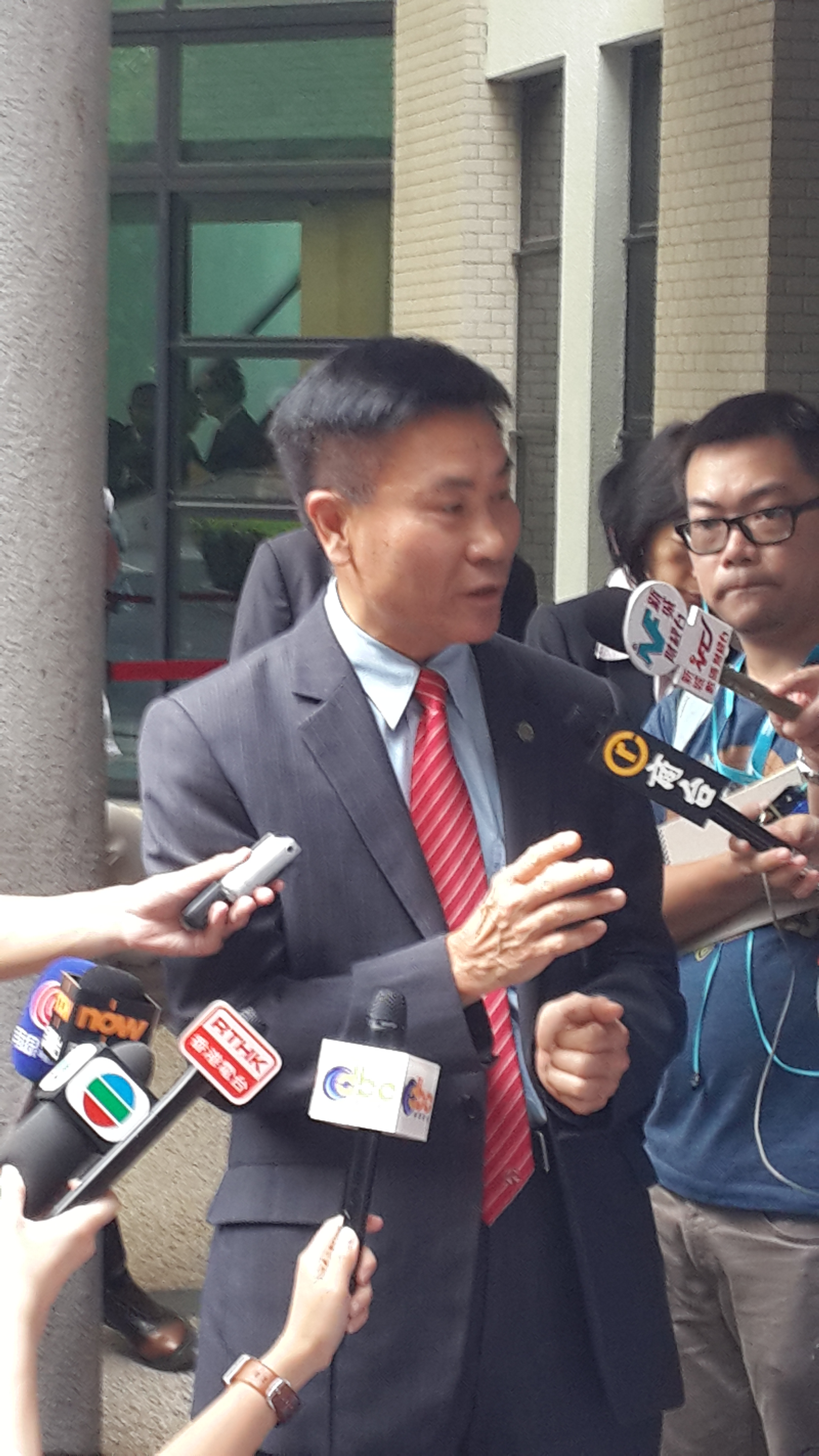
- CHENG Kwok Hon

3rd President of Lingnan University of Hong Kong
- Incumbent
- Assumed office 1 September 2013
- Chancellor: Leung Chun-ying; Carrie Lam
- Vice President: Prof Joshua Mok
- Preceded by: Prof Yuk-shee Chan

Personal details
- Born: November 1952 (age 73)
- Children: 2 daughters
- Education: Chinese University of Hong Kong (BSocSc); University of California, Berkeley (MA, PhD)
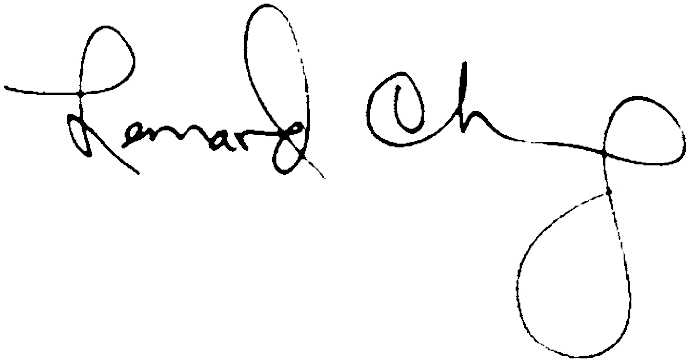
- Signature

Leonard Cheng
- Traditional Chinese: 鄭國漢
- Simplified Chinese: 郑国汉
Transcriptions
Standard Mandarin
- Hanyu Pinyin: Zhèng Guóhàn
Yue: Cantonese
- Jyutping: zeng6 gwok3 hon3

Professor Leonard Cheng Kwok-Hon, BBS, JP (Chinese: 鄭國漢; born November 1952) is the current president of the Lingnan University of Hong Kong. Before that he was appointed Dean of the School of Business and Management of the Hong Kong University of Science and Technology from 2009 to 2013.

Cheng graduated with first-class honours in Social Science in Economics at Chinese University of Hong Kong. He then went to the United States and obtained his MA and PhD degrees in Economics from the University of California, Berkeley. After earning his doctorate he pursued a teaching career in University of Florida for 12 years and subsequently returned to Hong Kong. In July 1992 he was one of the founding members of his department at Hong Kong University of Science and Technology where he stayed until he assumed his office at Lingnan University. During his capacity as Head of Economics he successively undertook several leading positions in the School of Business and steered different collaboration projects one of which, i.e. the joint EMBA Programme in Asia with the Kellogg School of Management of Northwestern University. The programme was launched in 1997 and was ranked the best in the world by the Financial Times consecutively from 2009 to 2012.

In September 2013 Cheng became the third President of Lingnan University of Hong Kong and also the Chair Professor of Economics.
