= Chen Bidi =

Chinese nutritionist

- Betty Chandler

Chinese People's Political Consultative Conference
- In office June 1983 – 3 May 2006

Personal details
- Born: Betty Chandler; May 6, 1915 Winnipeg, Canada
- Died: May 3, 2006 (aged 90)
- Education: University of Oregon; Lingnan University

Betty Chandler (6 May 1915 - 3 May 2006), commonly known in China as Chen Bidi (Chinese: 陳必弟, Pinyin: Chén Bìdì) was a Canadian-born Chinese nutritional scientist and teacher. She was a member of the Chinese Communist Party, and was a member of the Chinese People's Political Consultative Conference between 1983 and her death in 2006.

== Biography ==
Betty Chandler was born on 6 May 1915 in Winnipeg. At age 7, she moved to the United States, and graduated from the University of Oregon. In 1936, she went to Lingnan University as an exchange student. Her husband is Zhang Jizheng, a doctor.
