= Peter Matheson =

Peter Matheson may refer to:

- Peter Matheson, character in List of Person of Interest episodes
- Peter Matheson (animator) on Anastasia (1997 film)

== See also ==
- Peter Mathieson (disambiguation)
