= Yiu-Chung Cheng =

Professor Cheng Yiu-chung CBE JP

Vice-Chancellor of the University of Hong Kong
- In office March 13, 1996 – September 6, 2000
- Preceded by: Wang Gungwu
- Succeeded by: Ian Rees Davies

Vice-Chancellor of the City University of Hong Kong
- In office August 1, 1989 – March 12, 1996
- Preceded by: David Johns
- Succeeded by: Chang Hsin-kang

Personal details
- Born: February 9, 1939 (age 87)

Patrick Cheng Yiu-chung CBE, JP (Chinese: 鄭耀宗, born February 9, 1939) is a physicist, material scientist, electronic engineer who served as the former Vice-Chancellor of the University of Hong Kong and of the City University of Hong Kong.

Academic offices
Preceded by Wang Gungwu	Vice-Chancellor and President of the University of Hong Kong; 13 March 1996 – 6 September 2000	Succeeded by Ian Rees Davies
