= S. Joe Qin =

President of Lingnan University since 2023

Professor S.Joe Qin

4th President of Lingnan University
- Incumbent
- Assumed office 1 July 2023
- Preceded by: Leonard Cheng Kwok-Hon

Personal details
- Born: August 1963 (age 63) Rizhao, Shandong province, China
- Education: Tsinghua University; University of Maryland

Professor S. Joe Qin (Chinese: 秦泗釗) currently holds the position of Wai Kee Kau Chair Professor of Data Science and serves as the President of Lingnan University in Hong Kong.

== Career ==
From 1992 to 1995, Professor Qin served as a Principal Engineer at Emerson Process Management. He subsequently transitioned to academia, holding various positions at the University of Texas at Austin from 1995 to 2007, including assistant professor, associate professor, and professor. From 2003 to 2007, he held the Paul D. and Betty Robertson Meek and American Petrofina Foundation Centennial Professorship in Chemical Engineering.

From 2007 to 2019, he was the Fluor Professor at the Viterbi School of Engineering at the University of Southern California (USC), during which he took a three-year leave to serve as Vice President and Presidential Chair Professor at The Chinese University of Hong Kong, Shenzhen. From January 2020 to June 2023, he served in Hong Kong as the inaugural Dean of the School of Data Science and the Chair Professor of Data Science at the City University of Hong Kong.

== Education ==
Professor Qin possesses a diverse educational background encompassing multiple disciplines. He obtained his B.S. and M.S. in Automatic Control from Tsinghua University in Beijing, China, in 1984 and 1987, respectively. He then continued studying for his PhD in Automation at Tsinghua University until 1989. In 1989, Qin moved to the United States to pursue a PhD in Chemical Engineering at the University of Maryland, College Park, which he completed in June 1992.

== Honors and awards ==
=== Honors ===
- Fellow of the Institute of Electrical and Electronics Engineers (IEEE), 2011
- Fellow of the International Federation of Automatic Control (IFAC), 2014
- Fellow of the American Institute of Chemical Engineers (AIChE), 2018
- Fellow of the U.S. National Academy of Inventors (NAI), 2020
- Fellow of the Hong Kong Academy of Engineering (HKAE), 2023
- Member of the European Academy of Sciences and Arts (EASA), 2023
- Process Automation Hall of Fame (Control Global), 2026

=== Awards ===
- Halliburton/Brown & Root Young Faculty Excellence Award, 1999
- DuPont Young Professor Award, 1999-2002
- U.S. National Science Foundation CAREER Award, 2000
- NSF China Outstanding Young Investigator Award (2003-2006)
- IFAC Best Paper Prize for a model predictive control paper published in Control Engineering Practice (2005)
- MOE China Changjiang Professorship (2006-2009)
- Northrop Grumman Best Teaching Award, Viterbi School of Engineering, University of Southern California, 2011
- World's Top 2% Scientists by Stanford, 2019–present
- CAST Computing in Chemical Engineering Award from the American Institute of Chemical Engineers (AIChE), 2022
- IEEE CSS Transition to Practice Award, 2022
- Distinguished Lecturer of the IEEE Systems, Man, and Cybernetics Society, 2025
- Liaoning Provincial 2nd Class Natural Science Award, 2025
- Gold Award, Global AI Challenge for Building E&M Facilities, 2025
- Silver Award Geneva International Exhibition of Inventions, 2025

== Research ==
Professor Qin's research interests encompass data science and analytics, machine learning, process monitoring, model predictive control, system identification, smart manufacturing, smart cities, energy efficiency, and predictive health maintenance.

Qin held 12 U.S patents as of 2023. He has a prolific publication record of over 470 international journal papers, book chapters, conference papers, and presentations. His h-indices for Web of Science, SCOPUS, and Google Scholar are 71, 77, and 90, respectively. His work has garnered over 43,000 citations on Google Scholar (as of November 2025).

=== Editorial/Professional activities ===
- Editor for Control Engineering Practice (IFAC), 1999-2005
- Member of the Editorial Board for the Journal of Chemometrics (1999-2020)
- Senior Editor for the Journal of Process Control, 2015-2018
- Associate Editor for Journal of Process Control (2005-2015; 2019–present)
- Associate Editor for several other international journals, including IEEE Control Systems Magazine (2011-2013)
- National Organization Chair of the 10th IFAC Symposium on Advanced Control of Chemical Processes ADCHEM 2018 in Shenyang
- National Organization Chair of the 13th IFAC Symposium on Advanced Control of Chemical Processes ADCHEM 2027 in Hong Kong
