= Lingnan University Library =

Library at the campus of Lingnan University in Hong Kong

Coordinates: 22.41°N 113.983°E

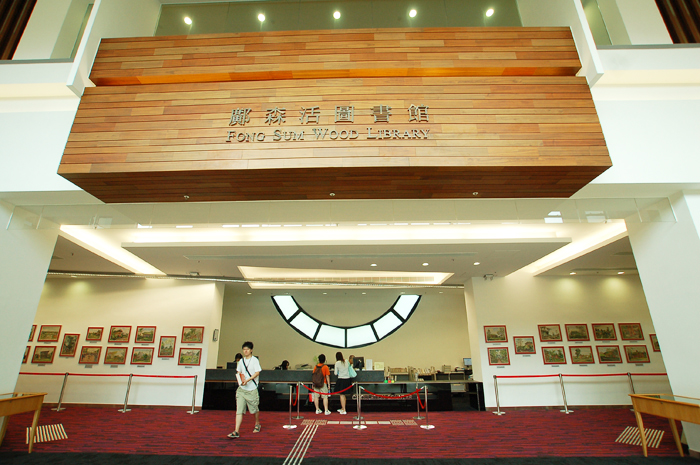
The counter of the Lingnan University Library

The Lingnan University Library, named after the late benefactor Fong Sum Wood in 1998, is located in the Main Building of Lingnan University, Hong Kong.

== Collections ==
The Library contains more than 530,000 volumes of books and 1,162 print journals. The Library also subscribes to over 270 online databases such as the Tuen Mun Heritage Image Database, Lingnan Newsletter, Lingnan Publications, Theses and Dissertations, and the Lingnan University Examination Database, and contains more than 177,000 items of media resources, including audio and video tapes, Blu-ray discs, DVD, laser discs, multimedia packages, and microforms.

== Services ==
The Library has a YouTube channel with video subjects including user guides, workshops, talks and seminars, and an Online Library Guide including a full tour of the facilities.

Additionally, the library has a website which offers a comprehensive catalogue, details on library programs, research assistance, the library's history, and facility booking information.

The library has been fully automated since 1994.

== Timeline ==
- 1967: Opening of the original Library in Stubbs Road, Wan Chai
- 1995: Opening of the current Library in Tuen Mun
- 2005: Construction of 3/F and 4/F and completion of the building
- 2008: Renovation of 1/F and 2/F
- 2009: Establishment of two study rooms on 3/F
- 2011: Completion of the LC Re-Classification Project
- 2012: Opening of the Lingnan University Archives

== Collaborations ==
The library has participated in resource sharing with libraries in Hong Kong, mainland China, Taiwan and Macau.

In 1993, the library established the Pearl River Delta Collection Project with the City University of Hong Kong Library. In 1996, the library started to cooperate with all Hong Kong academic libraries on Chinese cataloging.

In 1998, the library organized Joint Symposium on Library & Information Services.

In 1999, the library established the Hong Kong Chinese Authority (Name) database (HKCAN).

In 2012, the library organized the JULAC Libraries Forum.
