= Gregory Paul Jordan =

Vice-Chancellor of the University of Hong Kong

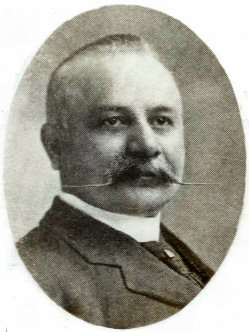
- Gregory Paul Jordan
- Born: 20th century Hong Kong
- Occupation: Businessman
- Organization: Armenian community of Hong Kong
- Known for: Armenian community leadership in Hong Kong
- Notable work: Community and philanthropic activities

Gregory Paul Jordan (died 4 December 1921) was a British-Indian doctor and educator of Armenian descent. He served in various medical positions throughout colonial British Hong Kong, and was involved with various medical and educational institutions in the territory.

== Early life and education ==
Gregory Paul Jordan was born in Calcutta (now Kolkata), a nephew of British-Indian property magnate Paul Chater.

Jordan graduated from Edinburgh University in 1880 with a Bachelor of Medicine, Master of Surgery degree. He then studied in Vienna and Paris, before receiving a Diploma of Member of the Royal College of Surgeons (MRCS) in 1884.

== Colonial career ==
After receiving his diploma, Jordan travelled to British Hong Kong and entered into a partnership with W. S. Adams which would eventually become Anderson & Partners. Around this time, he became colonial surgeon of Hong Kong.

Once the colonial surgeon post was abolished, Jordan took over from Adams as Port Health Officer, in addition to running his own medical practice. He remained in the post of Port Health Officer until his death. In 1887, he helped found and served as a consulting surgeon for the Alice Memorial Hospital. As he was earning income from his own private practice, Chinese patients treated at the Alice Memorial Hospital received free treatment from Jordan and his fellow doctors.

He became surgeon-superintendent to the police during World War I.

Alongside Patrick Manson and James Cantlie, Jordan helped to found the Hong Kong Medical College. He served in various faculty positions for the college, and in 1915 was appointed Professor of Tropical Medicines at its successor, the University of Hong Kong.

From 1913, he served as Pro-Vice-Chancellor for the University of Hong Kong, and from 1918 also served as Acting Vice-Chancellor. In January 1921, William Brunyate arrived to relieve Jordan of the office of Vice-Chancellor.

In his later years, he was granted the degree of Legum Doctor.

== Personal life ==
Jordan died on 4 December 1921 in London. He was married, and a member of the Freemasons.

== Legacy ==
Jordan was the namesake of Jordan Valley in New Kowloon. After Jordan's death, his uncle Paul Chater founded a library in his name within the Students' Union of the University of Hong Kong, which was opened the following September by his widow.

Academic offices
Preceded by Charles Eliot	Vice-chancellor of the University of Hong Kong (acting); 1918–1921	Succeeded by William Brunyate
