= Duncan Sloss =

Vice-chancellor of the University of Hong Kong

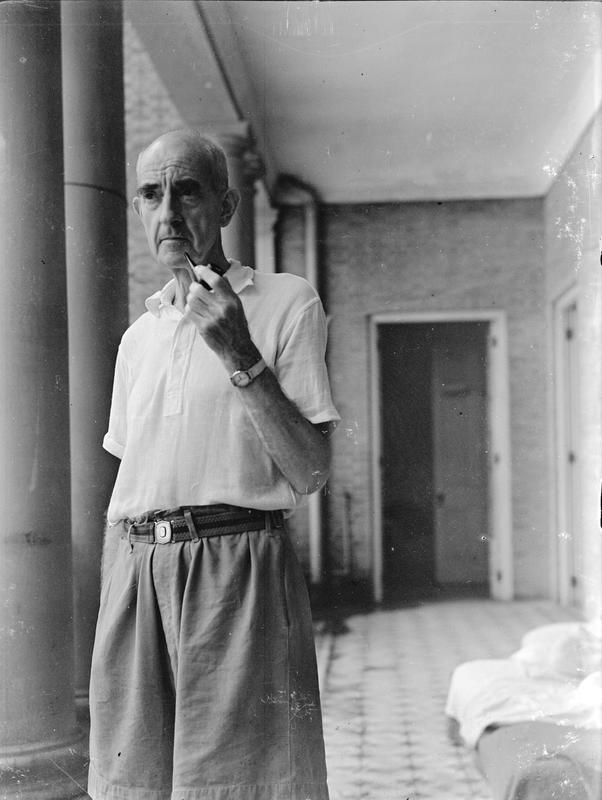
Sloss in 1945 at the liberation of Hong Kong

Duncan John Sloss CBE (19 June 1881 – 29 July 1964) was a British scholar. Vice-chancellor of the University of Hong Kong from 1937 to 1949, Sloss was praised for reviving the university after the Japanese invasion, during which he was interned.

== Early career ==
Sloss was educated at Culton School at Liverpool before entering the University of Liverpool. After concluding his early career as a school master and inspector of schools in England, he went to Maharajah College in Travancore, British India in early 1910s, before working in the Indian Education Service from 1920. He became the principal of the University College, Rangoon in 1923. For his contributions he was awarded Commander of the Order of the British Empire in 1925 Birthday Honours.

== Hong Kong ==
Nine months after his retirement from Burma in 1936, he agreed to continue his teaching career. He went on become vice-chancellor of the University of Hong Kong on 28 October 1937, succeeding the retiring principal William Hornell. He was for several years a member of the Executive Council.

Japan invaded Hong Kong in December 1941. Days after Hong Kong surrendered and occupied, on 31 December 1941, the Senate decided at an emergency meeting to confer war-time degrees to students whose study was interrupted by the war.^{:171} Further war-time degrees were also awarded to students in early 1942. Sloss also made a special arrangement with the occupying forces that the university residents would be interned at the university compound for the first few weeks. At the end of January he was transferred to the Stanley Internment Camp.^{:158-9} He held the post of Chief Censor at the outbreak of the war. After the surrender of Japan in August 1945, he was appointed publicity officer by Franklin Charles Gimson to hold daily press conferences to explain British policies to the population. To clear the alleged favouritism being shown by the authorities to the ex-internees, he informed the readers that the administration was "working ceaselessly to ensure the well-being of the people of all races".

He took a leading role in the decision to rebuild the University of Hong Kong after the war. He retired and left Hong Kong on 8 April 1949, receiving acclamations for his 12-year services, especially in the "revival and resurrection" of the university. The Duncan Sloss School of Engineering and Architecture opened in 1950 was named after Sloss.

== Death ==
Sloss died in Oxford on 29 July 1964.

== See also ==
- List of vice-chancellors of the University of Hong Kong

Academic offices
Preceded by Sir William Hornell	Vice-Chancellor of the University of Hong Kong; 1937–1949	Succeeded by Sir Lindsay Tasman Ride
