= Lindsay Tasman Ride =

Hong Kong academic

Brigadier Sir Lindsay Tasman Ride CBE

Vice-Chancellor of the University of Hong Kong
- In office April 1949 – November 1964
- Preceded by: Duncan John Sloss
- Succeeded by: William Charles Knowles

Personal details
- Born: Lindsay Tasman Ride; 10 October 1898 Newstead, Victoria, Australia
- Died: 17 October 1977 (aged 79) British Hong Kong
- Children: 4
- Education: Scotch College, Melbourne; Ormond College; New College, Oxford

Sir Lindsay Tasman Ride (10 October 1898 – 17 October 1977) was an Australian physiologist, soldier, and vice chancellor of the University of Hong Kong.

== Early life ==
Ride was born in Newstead, Victoria. He was the fifth child of Australian-born parents William Ride and Eliza Mary (née Best). His father was a pioneering Presbyterian missionary and his mother the daughter of a stonemason.

== Education and WWI ==
Ride attended three state schools in the country before being awarded a scholarship to Scotch College, Melbourne. There, he excelled in sport and won a senior government scholarship. On 14 February 1917, Ride enlisted in the AIF. Early in 1918, he joined the 38th Battalion on the Western Front. He was twice wounded, once seriously. Subsequently, on 24 April 1919, he was 'invalided out' of the army.

== Medical studies ==
Ride enrolled in medicine at the University of Melbourne where he was resident at Ormond College. There he took an active interest in sport by participating in rifle shooting, athletics, rowing, cricket and football. He was the president of the Students' Representative Council from 1921 to 1922. Ride was elected Victorian Rhodes scholar for 1922. At New College, Oxford, 'Blue' Ride as he was known, became captain of boats and steward of the junior common-room. With only mediocre academic results, authorities were nevertheless impressed to the point that they rated him 'a good Rhodes Scholar' and a 'first rate fellow'.

=== Becoming a surgeon ===
He worked at Guy's Hospital and qualified as a member of the Royal College of Surgeons, as well as a licentiate of the Royal College of Physicians, London.

== Marriage ==
On 30 June 1925, in Church of Scotland tradition, Ride married Canadian Mary Margaret Louise Fenety at St Columba's Church, Chelsea, London.

== Life in Hong Kong ==
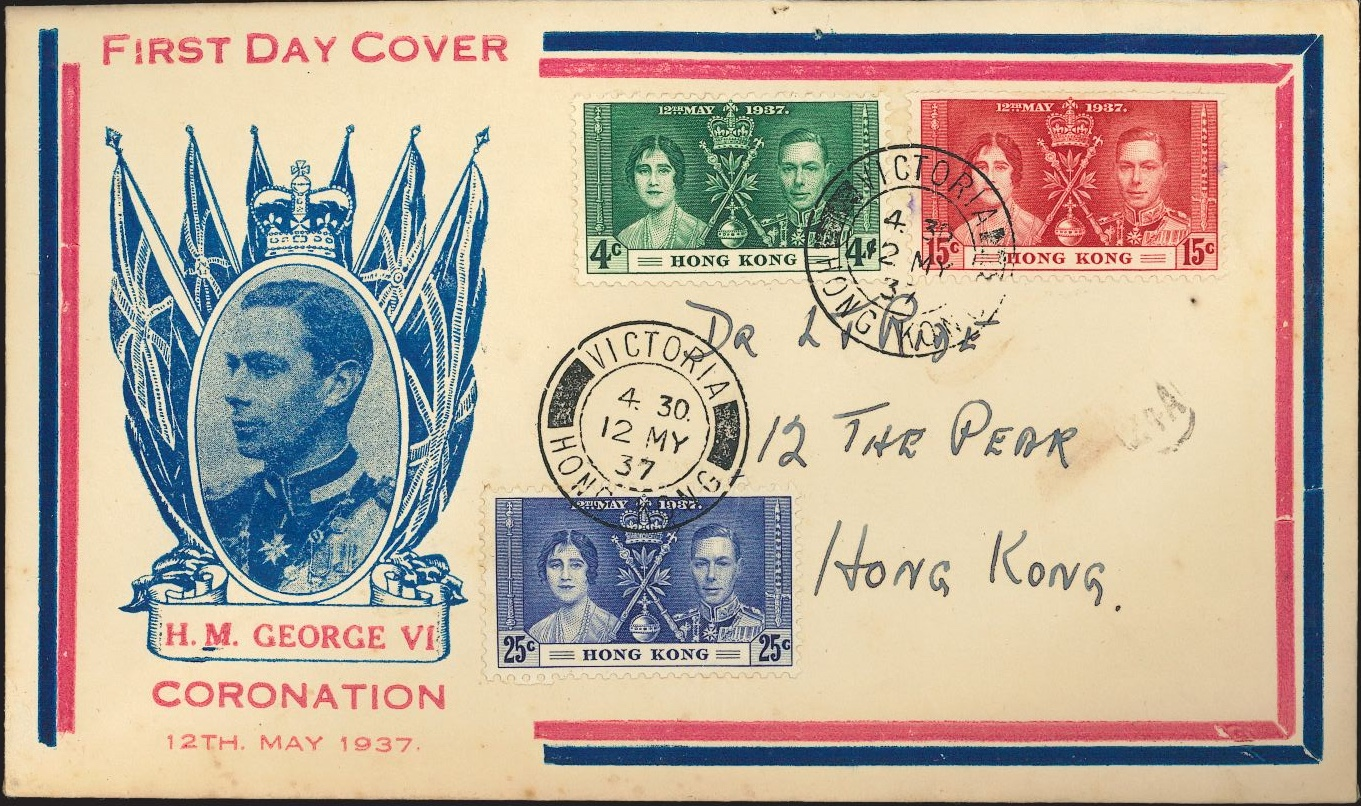
The first day cover (FDC) of KGVI Coronation (12 May 1937) Dr. L.T. Ride sent to himself, when he was the Head of Department of Physiology of HKU and the Dean of Medicine

Perhaps because of his natural ability for medical research, he was appointed professor of physiology at the University of Hong Kong on 21 October 1928. There, "Doc Ride", as he was known, investigated the blood groups of the peoples of the Pacific. In 1938, he wrote Genetics and the Clinician, published in Bristol, England. Ride was commissioned in the Hong Kong Volunteer Defence Corps and was appointed a justice of the peace. He was a keen rower and played for the Hong Kong Cricket Club. Ride became an elder in the Union Church. Possessing the voice of a baritone, he helped to found the Hong Kong Singers in 1934.

=== WWII and the Battle of Hong Kong ===
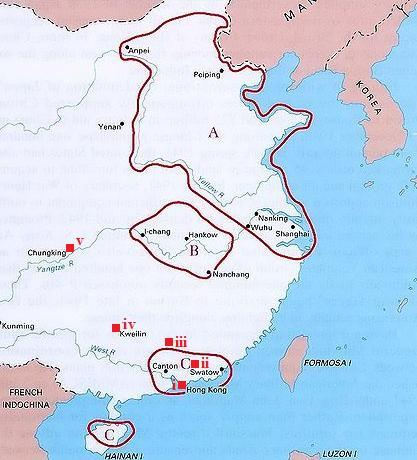
Lindsay Ride escaped from Japanese-occupied Hong Kong (i) on 9 January 1942. He reached Huizhou (ii), Kukong (iii), Guilin (iv), and finally arriving at Chongqing (v) on 17 February 1942. The red boundaries denote the Japanese-occupied area in China as of late 1941.

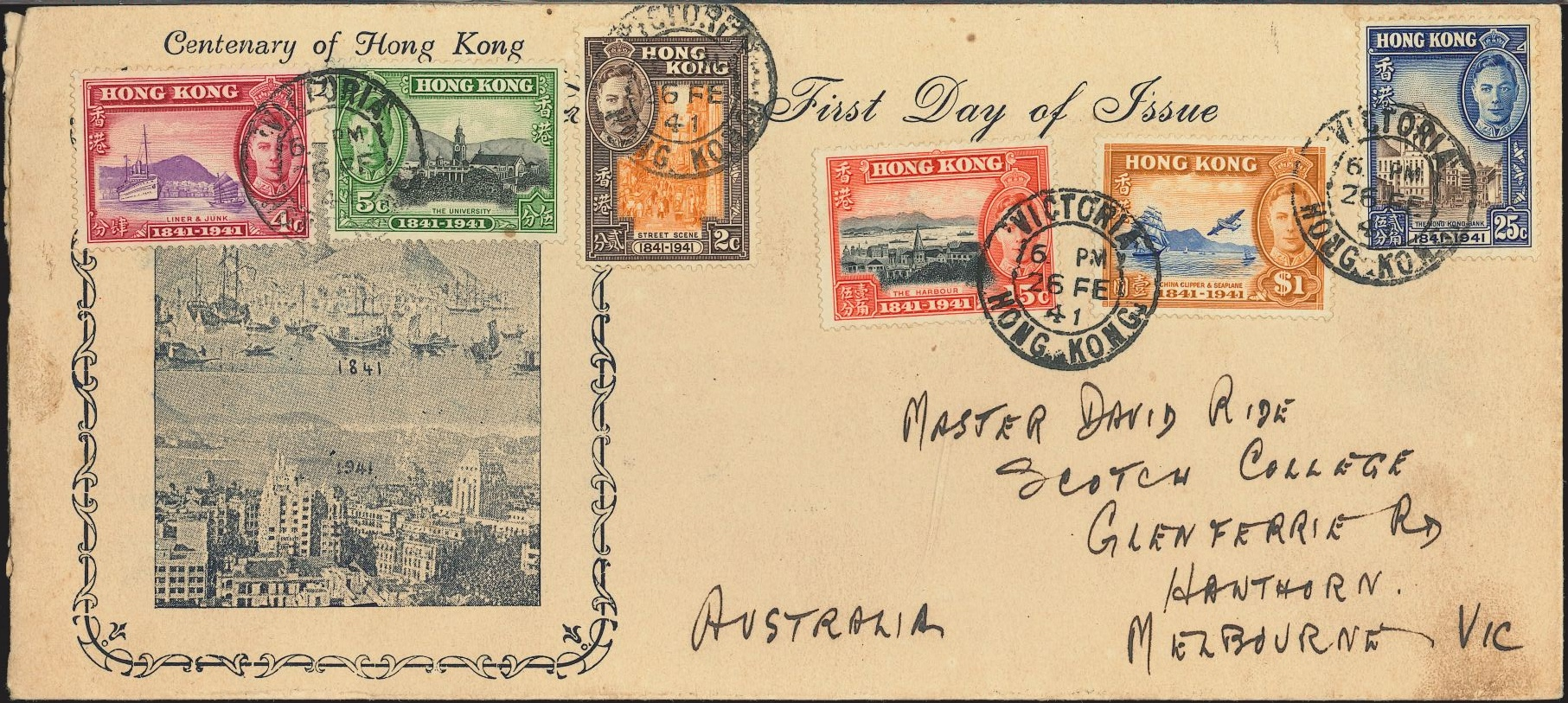
The first day cover (FDC) of 1841-1941 Centenary (26 Feb. 1941) Dr. L.T. Ride sent to his son Master David William Ride, who was attending Scotch College in Melbourne, Australia (David William Ride was sent to Australia in 1938 in anticipation of a Japanese invasion into the British colony.)

Ride sent his wife and children to Australia in 1938 in anticipation of a Japanese invasion into the British colony. In 1941, Ride commanded the Hong Kong Field Ambulance. He became a POW and was held in the prison established by the Japanese at the Sham Shui Po Barracks after Hong Kong capitulated on Christmas Day 1941.

On 9 January 1942, with the help of Hong Kong guerilla forces, he managed to escape to unoccupied Chungking, a feat for which he was appointed O.B.E. in 1942. While a colonel in the Indian Army, Ride formed and commanded the British Army Aid Group, headquartered in Guilin, Guangxi. This MI9 unit provided help, medical and otherwise, to POW escapees from Hong Kong while gathering intelligence. Due to his outstanding leadership after escaping, 'The Smiling Tiger' as he was nicknamed, was elevated to C.B.E. in 1944. From the formation in 1949 of the Royal Hong Kong Defence Force Ride was appointed commandant, first with the rank of Colonel, subsequently promoted to the rank of Brigadier in 1956, until his retirement in 1967.

=== Life as Vice Chancellor ===
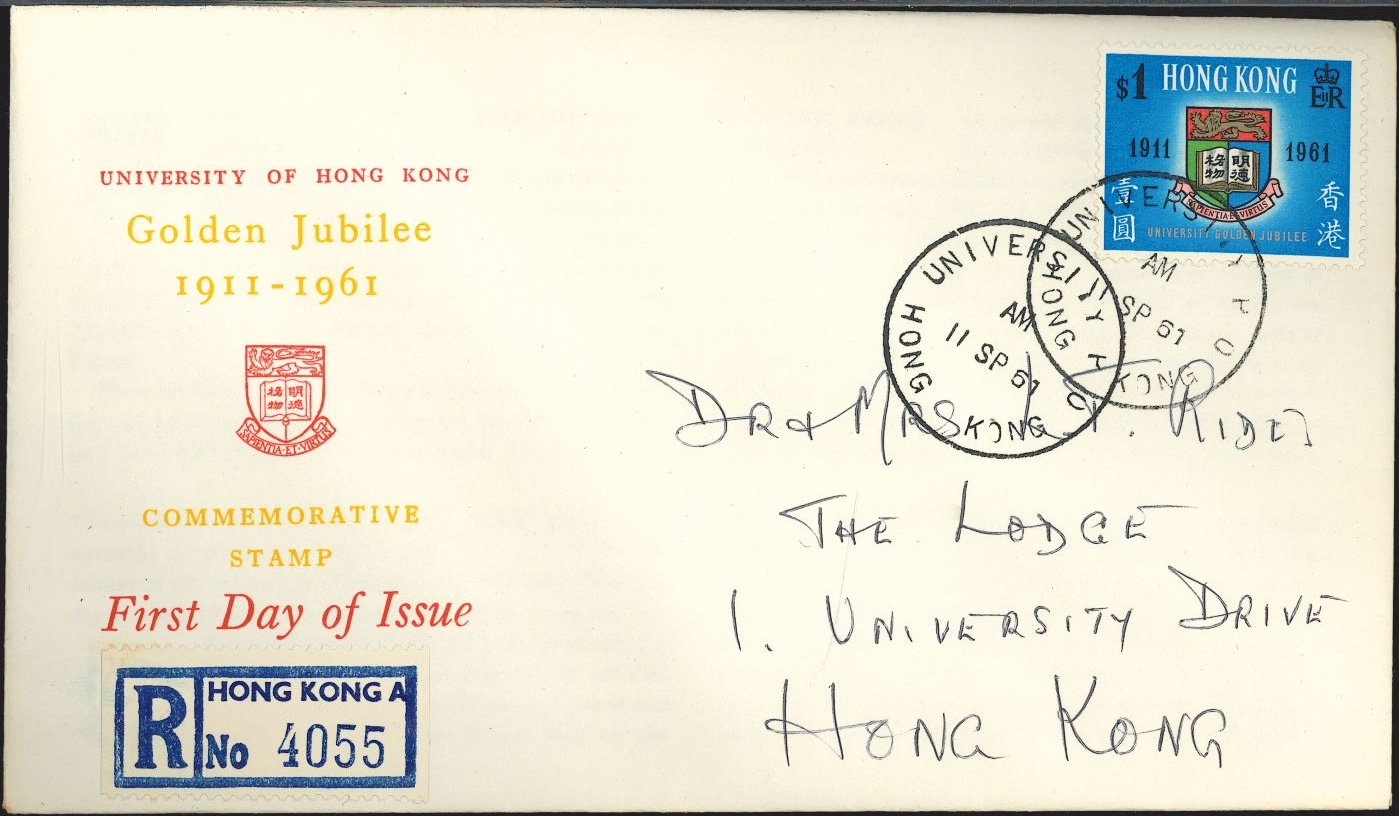
The first day cover (FDC) of HKU Golden Jubilee (11 Sept 1961) Dr. L.T. Ride sent to “Dr. and Mrs. Ride”

Ride was appointed vice-chancellor to a dilapidated, post-war University of Hong Kong in April 1949. 22 new buildings were erected and student numbers increased threefold in the 15 years after his appointment. He had been described as decisive, genial and authoritarian all at the same time. Ride enjoyed unwavering support among older staff but his paternalistic tendencies failed to endear him to staff who were appointed in later years. His HKU papers are available at the University of Hong Kong Archives.

== Honours and public duties ==
- Appointed OBE in 1942
- Made CBE in 1944
- Knight Bachelor in 1962

=== Education ===
- Honorary doctorates in Law from the University of Toronto, the University of Melbourne, the University of London and The University of Hong Kong

=== Singing ===
- Honorary Member of the Royal Academy of Music, London (1962)
- President and conductor of the Hong Kong Singers
- He was chairman of the Hong Kong Music Society

=== Military ===
- Honorary Colonel of the Hong Kong Regiment

=== Others ===
In 1967, Ride was a member of the 1967 commission of inquiry into the 1966 Kowloon riots. Together with his wife, Mary, he was also the author of A Monumental Survey of the Old Protestant Cemetery in Macau

== Personal life ==
Ride's marriage to his first wife Mary ended because of WWII. He married for the second time on 12 November 1954 at the Union Church in Hong Kong. Violet May Witchell, his second wife, had been his secretary before the war and had been interned in Stanley camp in Hong Kong during the war.

== Death ==
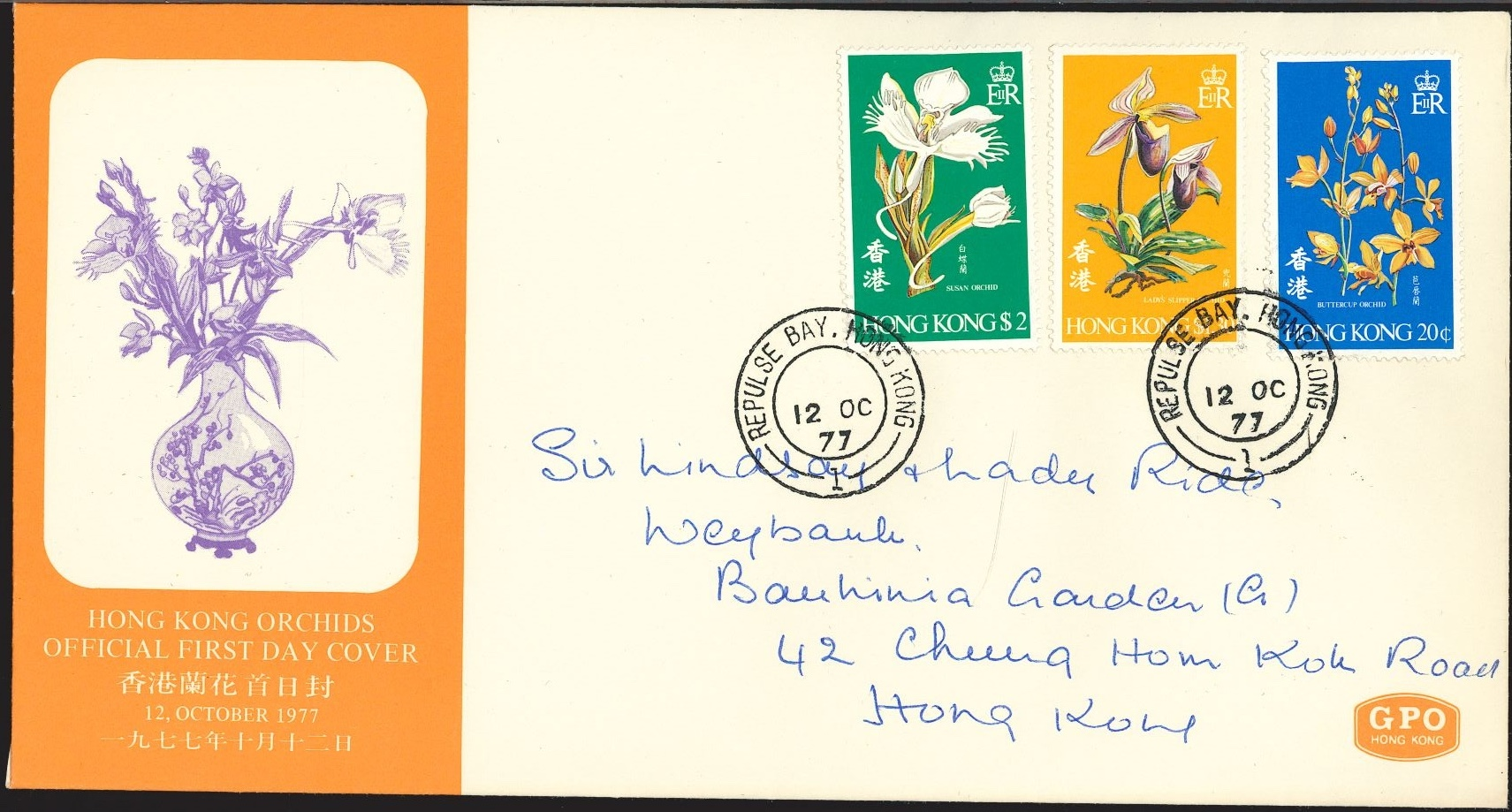
The first day cover (FDC) of HK Orchids (12 Oct 1977) Lady Ride sent to “Sir Lindsay and Lady Ride” (probably the last FDC of them as Sir Lindsay passed away one week later)

Sir Lindsay died on 17 October 1977 in Hong Kong and was cremated. He was survived by his widow, and his children (two sons and two daughters) from his first marriage. His ashes were deposited in the Protestant Cemetery of Macao (Cemitério Protestante Macau).

His son was the noted zoologist William David Lindsay Ride. His grandson is the writer, curator, and academic Peter Ride.

The Ming-Ai (London) Institute interviewed Ride's daughter as part of the British Chinese Armed Forces Heritage project.

== Notes ==
Academic offices
Preceded by Duncan Sloss	Vice-chancellor of the University of Hong Kong; 1949–1964	Succeeded by W. C. G. Knowles
