= Edward Chen (politician) =

- 陳坤耀
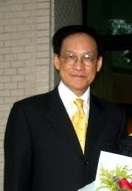

President of Lingnan College, then University
- In office 1 September 1995 – 31 August 2007
- Succeeded by: Chan Yuk-shee

Member of the Executive Council
- In office 1992–1997
- Appointed by: Chris Patten

Member of the Legislative Council
- In office 9 October 1991 – 7 October 1992
- Appointed by: David Wilson

Personal details
- Born: 14 January 1945 (age 81) British Hong Kong
- Education: University of Hong Kong (BEcon, MSSc); University of Oxford (DPhil)

Edward Chen
- Traditional Chinese: 陳坤耀
Transcriptions
Yue: Cantonese
- Yale Romanization: Chàhn Kwān yiuh
- Jyutping: Can^{4} Kwan^{1} jiu^{6}

Edward Chen Kwan-yiu (Chinese: 陳坤耀), CBE, GBS, JP (born 14 January 1945, Hong Kong) was the President of Lingnan University of Hong Kong.

He is now an Honorary Professor and Distinguished Fellow of the Centre of Asian Studies at the University of Hong Kong (HKU). He is a non-executive director of Wharf Holdings. He graduated with a Bachelor of Economics degree from HKU in 1967. He then pursued further studies at Linacre College, Oxford, where he earned his M.Phil and D.Phil degrees in economics. He returned to HKU to be an Assistant Lecturer and then Chair Professor from 1970 to 1995. He left HKU to take on the role of President of Lingnan University in 1995 until he retired in 2007.

He was a member of the Legislative Council of Hong Kong and the Executive Council of Hong Kong. He was a member of the Hong Kong Basic Law Consultative Committee and the chairman of the Hong Kong Consumer Council.

Political offices
| Preceded by Martin Lee | Chairman of Hong Kong Consumer Council; 1991–1997 | Succeeded by Anna Wu |
Order of precedence
| Preceded by Philip Wong; Recipients of the Gold Bauhinia Star | Hong Kong order of precedence Recipients of the Gold Bauhinia Star | Succeeded by James Kung; Recipients of the Gold Bauhinia Star |
