= Timothy O'Shea =

British computer scientist and academic

Sir Timothy O'Shea
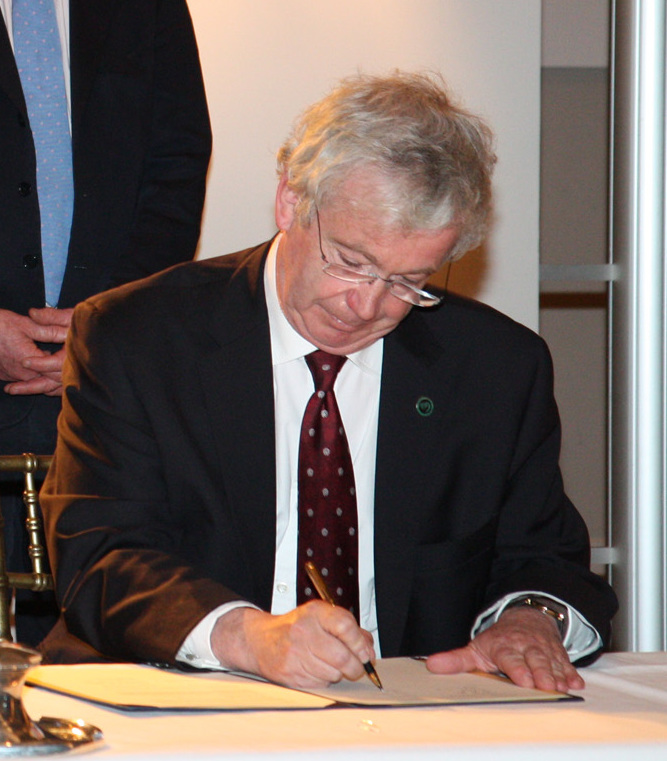
- O'Shea signing an agreement between Peking University and Edinburgh University in 2012

Vice-Chancellor and Principal of the University of Edinburgh
- In office 2002–2018
- Chancellor: Prince Philip, Duke of Edinburgh; Anne, Princess Royal
- Preceded by: The Lord Sutherland of Houndwood
- Succeeded by: Peter Mathieson

Master of Birkbeck, University of London
- In office 1 January 1998 – 31 December 2002
- Chancellor: Anne, Princess Royal
- Preceded by: The Baroness Blackstone
- Succeeded by: David Latchman (as Vice-Chancellor)

Personal details
- Born: 28 March 1949 (age 77) Hamburg, Germany
- Education: University of Sussex; University of Leeds

Sir Timothy Michael Martin O'Shea FRSE (born 28 March 1949, Hamburg, Germany) is a British computer scientist and academic. He was the Master of Birkbeck, University of London from 1998 to 2002 and subsequently Vice-Chancellor and Principal of the University of Edinburgh from 2002 to 2018.

== Biography ==
O'Shea grew up in London, attended the Royal Liberty School, in Romford, Essex. A computer scientist, he was Master of Birkbeck College from 1998 to 2002 and Pro-Vice-Chancellor of the University of London from 2001.

A graduate of the Universities of Sussex and Leeds, he has worked in the United States and for the Open University where he founded the Computer Assisted Learning Research Group and worked on a range of educational technology research and development projects, later becoming Pro-Vice-Chancellor there. He was a Research Fellow at the University of Edinburgh, Department of Artificial Intelligence, from 1974 to 1978.

The most translated of his ten books is Learning and Teaching with Computers, co-authored with John Self and his most recent 2007 book, In Order to Learn, published by Oxford University Press, was co-edited with Frank Ritter, Josef Nerb and Erno Lehtinen.

O'Shea became Principal of the University of Edinburgh in October 2002. Since his appointment he has sat on various boards including the Boards of Scottish Enterprise, the Intermediary Technology Institute Scotland Ltd, the British Council, the Governing Body of the Roslin Institute and has been Convenor of the Research and Commercialisation Committee of Universities Scotland and Acting Convener of Universities Scotland.

In 2004 he was elected Fellow of The Royal Society of Edinburgh.

He was knighted in the 2008 New Year Honours.

O'Shea received an Honorary Doctorate from Heriot-Watt University in 2008

On 21 June 2016, it was announced that O'Shea would step down from his position as Principal and Vice-Chancellor of the university in September 2017. He was elected a Fellow of the Royal Academy of Engineering in 2017.

== Boards and Committees ==
Since January 2008, O’Shea has been Chair of Jisc (formerly the Joint Information Systems Committee). He is also Chair of the Scottish Institute for Enterprise, was Chair of the board of directors of the Edinburgh Festival Fringe from 2012 to 2021, and the Board of Newbattle Abbey College Trust. He sits on the Council of the Confucius Institute Headquarters, and is currently a member of the German Initiative for Excellence, or 'Excellenzinitiative'.

Academic offices
Preceded by The Lord Sutherland of Houndwood	Principal of the University of Edinburgh; 2002–2018	Succeeded by Peter Mathieson
