= Edward I-hsin Chen =

Taiwanese politician (1950–2022)

- 陳一新
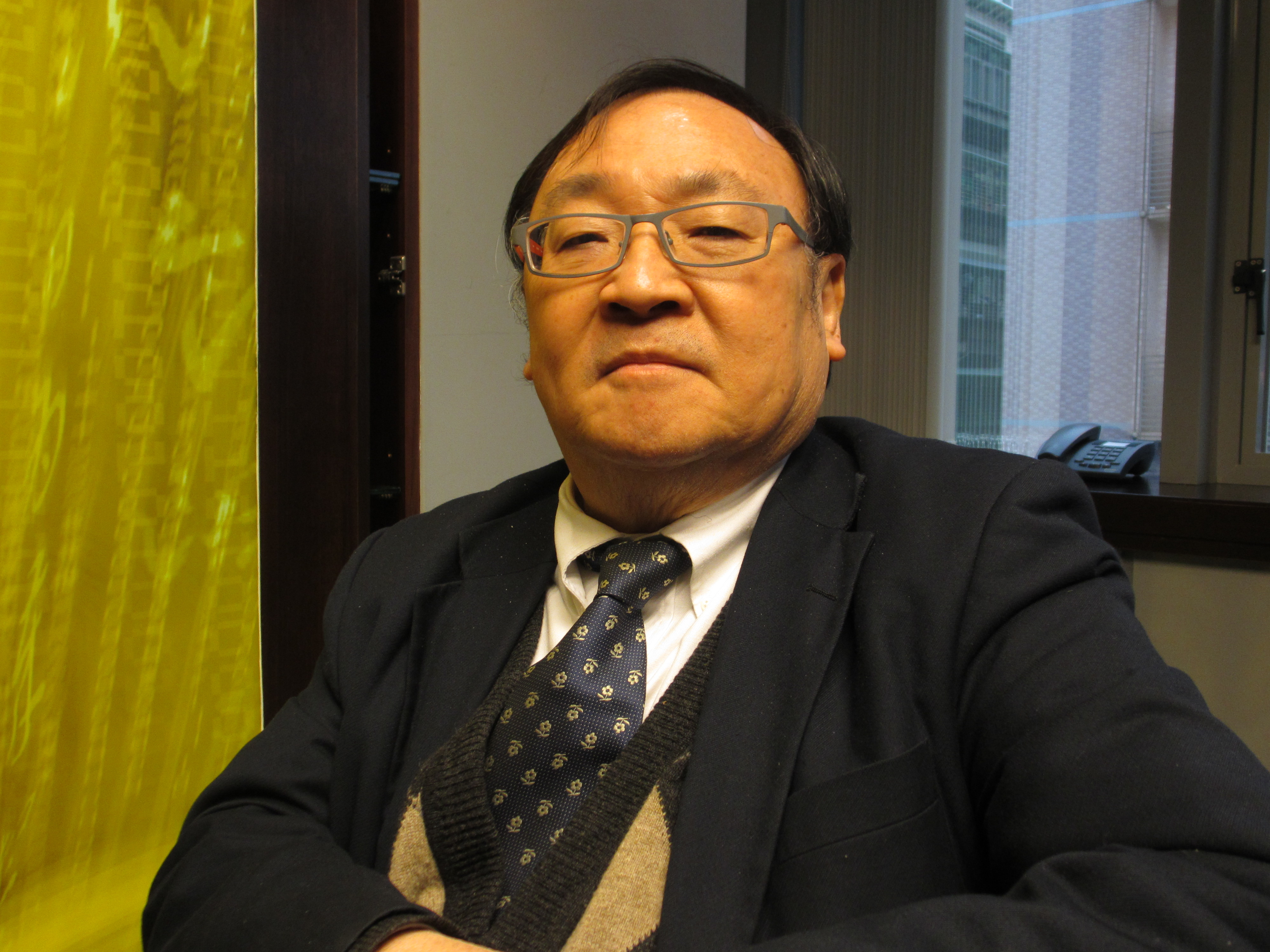
- I-hsin Chen in 2014

Member of the 3rd Legislative Yuan
- In office 1 February 1996 – 31 January 1999

Personal details
- Born: 5 February 1950 British Hong Kong
- Died: 31 December 2022 (aged 72) United States
- Political party: New Party
- Education: Tamkang University (BA, MA); Columbia University (MPhil, PhD)

Chen I-hsin (Chinese: 陳一新; 5 February 1950 – 31 December 2022), also known by his English name Edward I-hsin Chen, was a Hong Kong-born Taiwanese political scientist, politician, and academic. He served as a member of the Legislative Yuan from 1996 to 1999 from the New Party.

== Life ==
Chen was born in British Hong Kong on 5 February 1950 to parents from Hunan. He later emigrated to Taiwan.

Chen graduated from Tamkang University with a Bachelor of Arts (B.A.) specializing in the French language in 1972 and a master's degree in American studies in 1975, writing his master's degree thesis (Chinese title: 美國參議院外交委員會之研究) on the United States Senate Committee on Foreign Relations. He then completed doctoral studies in the United States, where he earned a Master of Philosophy (M.Phil.) in political science in 1982 and his Ph.D. in political science in 1986, both from Columbia University. His doctoral dissertation was titled, "The Evolution of Post-Mao Class Policy in a Comparative Perspective".

Chen was a professor in the Department of Diplomacy and International Relations at Tamkang University and the director of the university's Graduate Institute of Americas from 2001 until 2005. He specialized in Taiwan–United States relations, Cross-Strait relations, globalization studies, international relations, and international political economics.

== Death ==
Chen died in the United States on 31 December 2022, at the age of 72. He was survived by his wife, Nan Nan Huo, and two daughters. His funeral was held in Old Bridge, New Jersey.
