= Otto C.C. Lin =

Chinese chemist (born 1938)

- 林垂宙
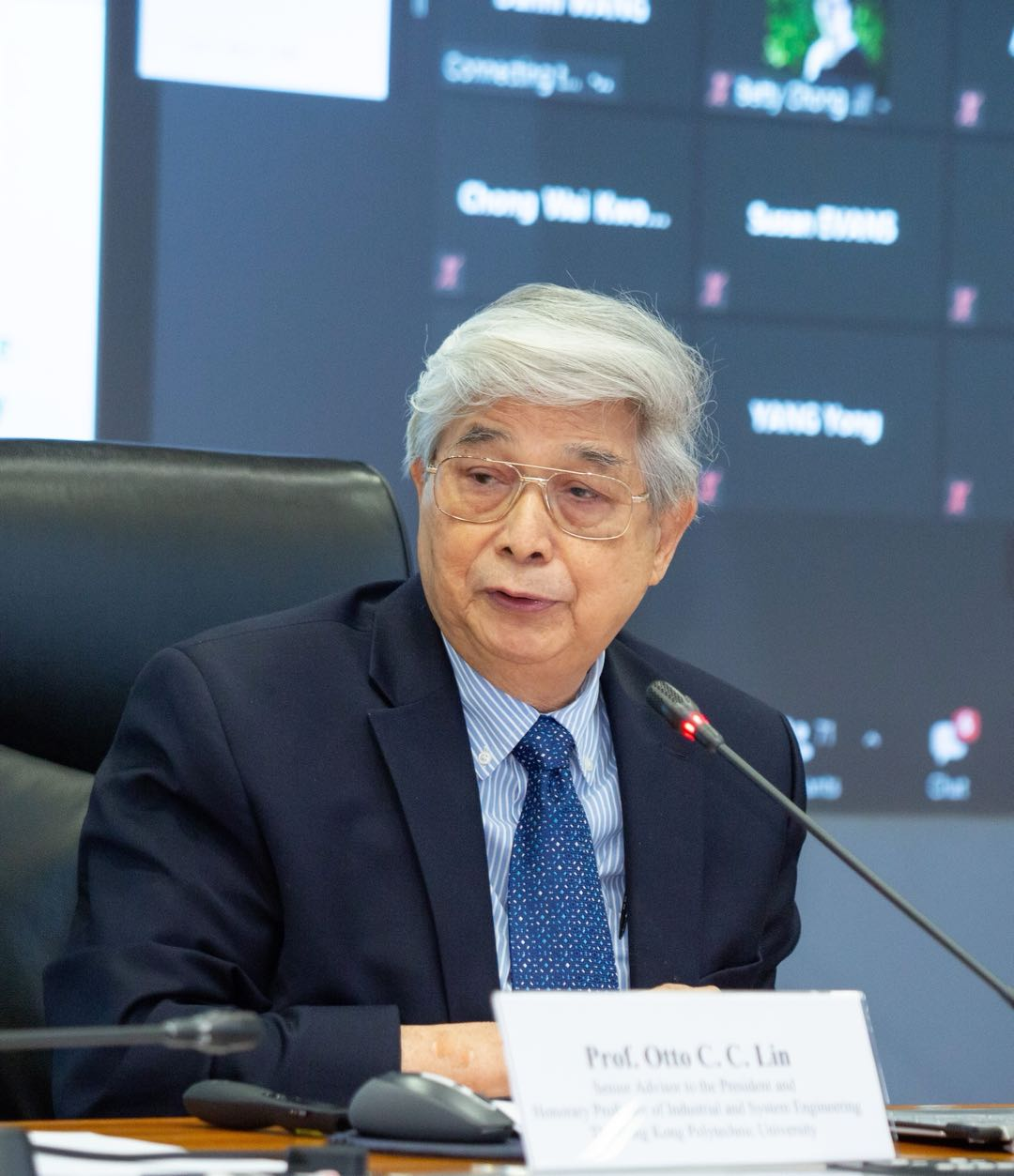
- Born: 1938 (age 87–88); Shantou, Guangdong, China
- Education: National Taiwan University (BS); Columbia University (MA, PhD)

Otto Chui Chau Lin (Chinese: 林垂宙; born 1938) is a Taiwanese chemist.

== Early life and education ==
Otto Lin was born in Shantou, Guangdong, China, in 1938. He came to Hong Kong as a refugee and went to Taiwan in 1953. He attended National Taiwan University and graduated with a Bachelor of Science in chemical engineering in 1960. After serving in the ROTC, he was admitted to the University of Illinois at Champaign-Urbana for post-graduate studies. Later he transferred to Columbia University in New York City, receiving a PhD in 1967 in chemistry. His doctoral research was on the relationship of macromolecular conformation and hydrodynamic properties of DNA.

== 1967: working at Du Pont on innovations in polymer rheology ==
Lin was recruited by Du Pont de Nemours and Company in Wilmington, Delaware to explore the role of rheology in polymer coatings. Working at both Marshall Laboratory in Philadelphia and the Experimental Station in Wilmington, he focused on developing polymer coating systems in compliance with air pollution control regulations gradually being introduced in the United States. His assignment was multi-faceted involving coordinating technical studies in polymer science, rheological design, application engineering and field services. Later the assignment was broadened to include electronic circuit products.

The Du Pont experience gave him insights on the pursuit of innovation in many leading U. S. corporations such as General Motors, General Electrics, IBM, AT&T, and Boeing. All were clients he would call to resolve application issues involving innovative Du Pont-trademarked materials. Later in 1987, when he attended the Advanced Management Program (AMP, Class 101) at the Harvard University Graduate School of Business, he expounded the value of multi-disciplinary collaboration in problem-solving even for companies of competing interests.

== 1979–1982: building technology infrastructure in Taiwan ==
In 1979, Lin went to Taiwan on a sabbatical leave and was appointed professor and dean of the school of engineering at National Tsing Hua University in Hsinchu. At the request of the National Science Council, chaired by Shien-Shiu Shu, he chaired an expert committee to lay out a blueprint for the development of polymer science and engineering which was a part of the industrial strategy to upgrade the productivity of the petrochemical clusters in Taiwan.

Concurrently, he was charged with managing the Tsing-Hua development of experimental electric vehicles, a pioneering R&D program aimed at lifting Taiwan's fuel efficiency and environmental protection in its petroleum-driven economy. Embarking on EV development in the early 1980s reflected the vision of the leadership of Chiang Ching-Kuo and his technocrat teams including Yuen-Hsuan Sun, Shien-Shiu Shu, and Kuo-Ting Li. The EV effort was later aborted due to the deficiency of lead acid battery technology and divergent social priorities. Nevertheless, it has paved Lin's research interests in a national innovation system where universities, technology institutes, business groups and national and regional government agencies collaborate for overall economic development.

He also played the role of advisor to the Hsinchu Science Based Industrial Park which was at its planning stage under the NSC. The park was designed to attract domestic and foreign entrepreneurs to implement their innovations. In the end, it has become the cradle of Taiwan's high-tech industry. By the year 2000, over 65% of the world production of microelectronic chips was manufactured by companies based at the Science Park.

== 1983: leading a new research lab in materials science ==
In 1982, the new Materials Research Laboratories (MRL) was established under the Industrial Technology Research Institute (ITRI) and Lin was appointed as its founding director. But an illness kept him from coming on board until 1983, when he resigned from Du Pont and moved his family (wife Ada and 2 school-age children, Ann and Gene, and later Dean) to Hsin-Chu. He started thorough planning for MRL to position it as the future center of excellence in materials science and engineering for Taiwan. It consisted of 7 technical divisions: metallurgy, polymers, fine ceramics, opto-electronics, corrosion protection, sensor materials and systems, materials characterization and selection. Additionally, a large technical service group was established for services to the industries. He instituted programs in recruitment, international exchanges and training.

Since most of the technology fields were new in Taiwan, Lin established collaborative programs globally, including in the U.S. (MIT, University of California, University of Washington), Japan (NIRIM, Hitachi, Toshiba) and Germany (IZFT). He was elected president of the Chinese Society of Materials Science (Taiwan). He led CSMS to participate in the Materials Research Society (International), where working relationships with counterparts from mainland China were established.

== 1988–1994: leading ITRI ==
Lin was appointed executive director and president of ITRI in 1988, succeeding Morris Chang who took charge as CEO of the Taiwan Semiconductor Manufacturing Corporation (TSMC), the largest spin-off company of ITRI.

He was elected a foreign member to the Royal Swedish Academy of Engineering Sciences (IVA), member of the Hong Kong Academy of Engineering Sciences, president of the Asia Pacific Confederation of Chemical Engineering (APCChE), and received the TWNSO Technology Award of the Third World Academy of Sciences, Drexel University Industrial Leadership Award, CIE-USA Award of Outstanding accomplishments, among other honors.

== 1995–2000: international engagements in innovation and entrepreneurship ==
Lin retired from ITRI in 1995 after serving two terms of his presidency. He rejoined Tsing-Hua University at Hsinchu as Professor of Industrial Engineering and Engineering Management and was soon offered the position of senior vice president and CTO of the Westlake Group of Companies in Houston, a petrochemical business. After a short stay, he accepted an appointment as a visiting professor at the National University of Singapore. He helped establish the cooperation in education and research between NUS and MIT which later became a collaboration between Singapore and MIT.

He participated actively in global innovation organizations. He was twice invited speaker at the Six Country Conference and repeatedly, the Salzburg Global Seminar in Austria and USA.

== 1997–2007: Hong Kong University of Science and Technology ==
In April 1997, Lin joined the new Hong Kong University of Science and Technology (HKUST) as Vice President-Research and Development. At the juncture of Hong Kong returning to Chinese sovereignty, Lin, like many of his peers born in the time of the Sino-Japanese War, felt it a duty to contribute to this historic transition by working in Hong Kong. At the university, he placed a focus on establishing research infrastructure, research strategy and university-societal outreach.

An oral history conducted in 2007–2009 by the Bancroft Library, University of California-Berkeley, under a grant from the Kauffman Foundation, has documented Lin's work on promoting innovation and entrepreneurship, and his efforts on education.
