= William Brunyate =

English civil servant

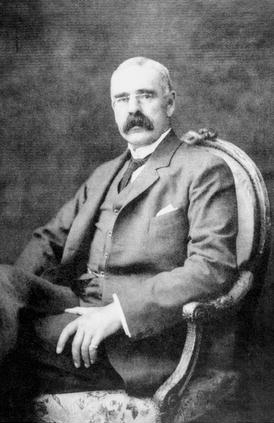
William Brunyate

Sir William Edwin Brunyate KCMG (12 September 1867 – 1943) was an English civil servant who served as legal adviser to the Ministry of Justice, Egypt, during its British protectorate, and was the second vice-chancellor of the University of Hong Kong.

== Early life ==
Brunyate was the second son of the Rev. Wesley Brunyate, of Landsdown, Bath, and Anne Tombleson. He received his education at Kingswood School, Bath, and Trinity College, Cambridge, where he graduated bachelor of arts in 1888 and master of arts in 1892. An exceptional mathematician, he was Proxime Accessit (second wrangler) to the Senior Wrangler at Cambridge in 1888. He was president of the Cambridge Union for Lent, 1890.

Brunyate was called to the bar at Lincoln's Inn in 1894. He married American Bertha Maud Vipond in 1896.

== Egypt ==
Brunyate began Egyptian government service in 1898, ultimately serving 23 years. He was Legal Adviser from 1903 and it was in this role that he contributed to the drafting of the British Protectorate of 1914.

He was Judicial Adviser from 1916 to 1919, and also acting Financial Adviser from 1917 to 1919. In his advisory role, he exercised such powers as setting the price and controlling distribution of basic commodities, including sugar.

Brunyate was chairman of the eight-member commission on judicial reform established by the British-controlled Egyptian government in March 1917 which became known as the Brunyate Commission. The effect of the commission's 1918 recommendations was to entrench British rule, which met stiff Egyptian resistance. His dismissive response to warnings of a conflagration was that he would "put out the fire by spitting on it".

By 1919, Brunyate was so despised for promoting conversion of the informal protectorate to something akin to colonial rule that he was assessed an assassination risk.

Having fallen ill, Brunyate was replaced later that year and retired from the civil service in 1920.

== University of Hong Kong ==
Brunyate received his appointment to the University of Hong Kong from Secretary of State Lord Milner and arrived in Hong Kong in January 1921. He was formally installed on 7 April. The university which came under his care was a young one, having produced its first graduates only four years earlier. It was in a state of serious financial uncertainty so he spent his three years in the role attempting to shore up its meager resources. He was aided at the outset by the fruits of his predecessor Prof. Gregory Jordan's efforts at fund-raising, with over $300,000 coming in from private donors, plus ongoing commitments from others. In his first year, he spread the search for funding further afield, succeeding in establishing numerous scholarships through international sponsors. Though he achieved some considerable success, he was regarded as rigid, remote and forbidding, and lacking the tact and urbanity of manner demanded of the post. He was succeeded by William Hornell on 18 February 1924.

== United States ==
Brunyate later took an interest in US law, writing on the subject of the 1930 American Draft Code of Criminal Procedure in 1933. He died in 1943.

== Honours ==
Brunyate, then Khedivial Counsellor, Ministry of Justice, Egypt, was made a Companion of the Order of St Michael and St George in 1907 and, then Legal Adviser under the Sultanate, Knight Commander in 1916. He was Grand Officer of the Order of the Osmanieh and was conferred the Grand Cordon of the Order of the Nile.

He received a doctor of laws honoris causae from the University of Hong Kong in 1924 upon his departure as the head of the university.

Academic offices
Preceded by G. P. Jordan	Vice-chancellor of the University of Hong Kong; 1921–1924	Succeeded by William Hornell
