= Peter Mathieson (nephrologist) =

English nephrologist (born 1959)

Sir Peter Mathieson FRCP FMedSci
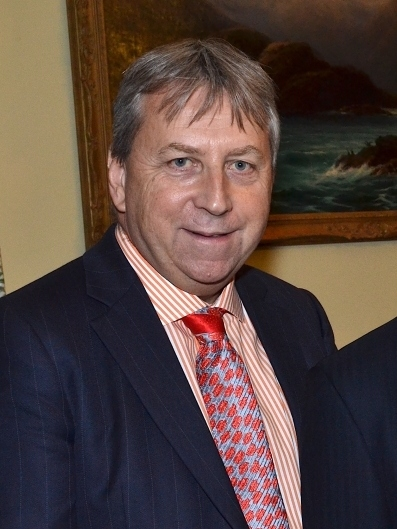
- Mathieson in 2019

Vice Chancellor and Principal of the University of Edinburgh
- Incumbent
- Assumed office 1 February 2018
- Chancellor: Anne, Princess Royal
- Preceded by: Timothy O'Shea

Vice Chancellor and President of the University of Hong Kong
- In office 1 April 2014 – 31 January 2018
- Chancellor: Leung Chun-ying; Carrie Lam
- Preceded by: Tsui Lap-chee
- Succeeded by: Xiang Zhang

Personal details
- Born: Peter William Mathieson; 18 April 1959 (age 67) Colchester, England, UK
- Education: London Hospital Medical College (MBBS); Christ's College, Cambridge (PhD)

Academic background
- Thesis: Role of T Lymphocytes in Autoimmune Responses (1992)

Sir Peter William Mathieson (Chinese: 馬斐森; born 18 April 1959) is an English nephrologist and current principal and vice-chancellor of the University of Edinburgh. Previously, he served as the vice-chancellor and president of the University of Hong Kong (HKU). He was the dean of the Faculty of Medicine and Dentistry of the University of Bristol before he assumed office at the HKU in April 2014, and was previously director of studies at Christ's College, Cambridge.

== Biography ==
Mathieson went to school in Penzance, Cornwall. He studied medicine at London Hospital Medical College and earned Bachelor of Medicine, Bachelor of Surgery with first class honours awarded from University of London in 1983. After junior posts in and around the West End of London, he went to Christ's College, Cambridge as a Medical Research Council (MRC) training fellow, studying for a PhD which was awarded in 1992. His thesis was titled "Role of T lymphocytes in autoimmune responses". While studying for his PhD, Mathieson also taught at Cambridge and was named 'Teacher of the Year' in 1992 by the university's medical students. Mathieson was awarded a second MRC fellowship during which he worked on complement/immunology with Douglas Fearon and Peter Lachmann. He was also Director of Studies for Clinical Medicine at Christ's College, Cambridge.

== Career ==
=== University of Bristol ===
Mathieson joined the University of Bristol in 1995 as the foundation professor of renal medicine. He was also honorary consultant nephrologist with the North Bristol NHS Trust. In 1999 he was elected as a fellow of the Academy of Medical Sciences, United Kingdom. While at the University of Bristol, Mathieson ran 'The cellular basis of albuminuria' research project, with £585,000 funding from the MRC from 2005 to 2008. The project aimed to 'develop ways of detecting and treating early kidney and heart disease'. In 2007 he was elected as the youngest ever president of the Renal Association and also became head of the University Department of Clinical Science at North Bristol. He was also appointed as director of research & development for the North Bristol NHS Trust. Between 2003 and 2007 he chaired the Research Grants Committee of Kidney Research UK [formerly National Kidney Research Fund]. He was a member of the Renal Association Clinical Trials committee from 1996 to 2007 and its chairman between 2000 and 2003. In 2008 he was appointed dean of the Faculty of Medicine and Dentistry at the University of Bristol.

He was appointed Dean of the university's Faculty of Medicine and Dentistry in 2008. Foundation doctors at University Hospitals Bristol voted Mathieson as 'Top Teacher' for 2011–12. A further MRC-funded research project on treatment of patients with membranous nephropathy (a type of kidney disease) found a treatment which mitigated against deterioration; the results were published in The Lancet.

=== University of Hong Kong ===
In October 2013, Mathieson was appointed vice chancellor of the University of Hong Kong, replacing Lap-Chee Tsui. He was the first British person to be appointed the chancellor of HKU since Kenneth Robinson. (Note: Ian Rees Davies succeeded as chancellor after Cheng Yiu-chung's resignation and was not directly appointed.) His appointment was controversial as some staff felt that Mathieson lacked management experience and familiarity with Chinese society. Leong Che-hung, who headed the committee that appointed Mathieson noted that he had experience running a faculty at the University of Bristol, while Mathieson himself suggested his unfamiliarity with China gave the opportunity for a fresh start.

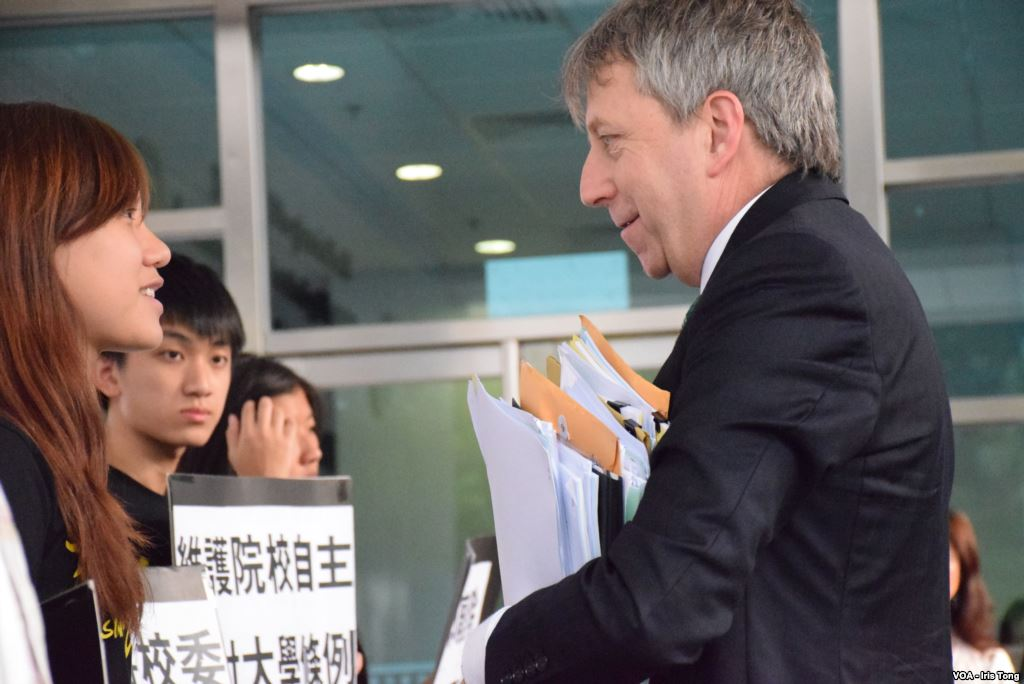
Mathieson meeting students protesting the HKU council's refusal to appoint Johannes Chan as pro-vice-chancellor in September 2015. Mathieson supported the appointment.

His tenure at HKU was described to be full of "tension and clashes between the university's governing body and students". Five months into his vice-chancellorship, a students-led class boycott, protesting against Beijing authorities' decision of Hong Kong's suffrage, evolved into a 79-day occupy protest. During the crisis, he stated that independence was not a realistic political option for Hong Kong, but defended the rights of students to protest in favour of Hong Kong's democratic values.

In 2015, Mathieson was elected as an honorary fellow of Hughes Hall, University of Cambridge. That year, a University of Hong Kong panel led by Mathieson selected Johannes Chan as pro-vice-chancellor, however the appointment was blocked by the university's governing council. Chan is pro-democracy, supports human rights, and had supported the student occupy protest in 2014, and was unpopular with the government. The episode was viewed as an incident in which the university's academic freedom was under threat, and Mathieson's authority suffered as a result; in a staff survey, 78% of people did not feel Mathieson had "effectively protected academic freedom". Addressing the results of the survey, Mathieson acknowledged the unpopularity of some of his actions and questioned the survey's methodology.

On 2 February 2017, two years before the original expiry of his contract, Mathieson resigned from the post of HKU. Mathieson claimed that he was squeezed out of the position by HKU's Chairman of the Governing Council, Arthur Li. The Chairman of the Staff Association, William Cheung, stated "you may now appreciate why we thank you [University of Edinburgh] so many times for taking Professor Mathieson on board" after claims that Mathieson failed to uphold academic freedom, discouraged debate on campus, and did not understand the needs of students emerged from a staff survey. Addressing the results of the survey, Mathieson described the survey as flawed in its methodology.

=== University of Edinburgh ===
Mathieson became Principal and Vice-Chancellor of the University of Edinburgh in February 2018, succeeding Sir Timothy O'Shea in the role. When he began at the University of Edinburgh, Mathieson had a £342,000 salary, which was less than he was paid at HKU. While the university said the salary was set in relation to vice chancellor pay at similar sized universities, it was criticised by the University and College Union during the UK-wide dispute between university staff and management over pensions. In response, Mathieson told The Times, "I had no negotiations – they made me an offer and I accepted it."

In addition to his salary package, Mathieson is provided with a house rent and bill free. The University paid £17,910 to maintain the property in 2021–22, including paying council tax and servicing the property’s aga cooker.

At Edinburgh, Mathieson was further criticised for his lack of oversight in relation to a replacement finance system which failed to pay staff, students and suppliers over an extended period, continued to give units within the University no financial control for more than a year after its implementation and cost more than double its original £14 million price tag. As convener of the Senatus Academicus (Academic Senate), he accepted a 2023 motion of no confidence over the finance system implementation as uncontentious rather than face a vote. He was further criticised for accepting a pay rise of £43,000 in 2022, at a time when staff continued to strike due to erosion of their salaries. Student protests disrupted the 2023 summer graduations, where Mathieson was blamed for not settling the dispute with his staff causing students to receive unclassified degrees and bringing calls for his resignation.

In December 2023 the Edinburgh University Students' Association voted for Mathieson's resignation with a 95% majority of 648 votes for, 35 votes against, and 29 abstentions on a motion of "University management accountability and vote of no confidence". The motion called for his resignation no later than July 2024. Mathieson did not resign in response.

In April 2024, Mathieson met with students involved in setting up a pro-Palestine encampment at the University of Edinburgh's Old College. Mathieson and vice-principal Colm Harmon heard concerns from student demonstrators urging for Edinburgh to divest funding from companies tied to Israel, accusing it of committing genocide in Gaza. Mathieson emphasized that the university would respect peaceful protest rights, while also defending its investment practices. The university subsequently established a working group to review its investment policies and launched a consultation on ethical investing principles.

In February 2025, Mathieson wrote to staff to announce £140m per year as the level of recurring savings required to secure the University's financial sustainability. He also highlighted that it costs £120m a month to run the institution. The university had assets of £3.1 billion and an annual surplus of £85m in 2024. While there were structural factors across the sector, the University and College Union described Edinburgh's predicament as a 'manufactured crisis' and blamed uncontrolled capital expenditure (including buying land and buildings), inappropriate accounting metrics, excessive financial targets set as key performance indicators for Mathieson and other senior managers, and the lack of financial controls over an extended period while the new finance system was brought into service. The University internally announced then denied that it had bought the iconic former Scottish Widows Headquarters on Dalkeith Road in Edinburgh and Mathieson was criticised for spending £40,000 on travel and hotels. He was also condemned for taking a second job as a Director of the biotech firm Roslin Cell Therapies in June 2024.

On 20 May 2025, the Senate, the University of Edinburgh's supreme academic body, approved the motion that "Senate has no confidence in the University Executive’s leadership in relation to the University’s financial situation", by 91 votes to 43. Following the vote, trade unions called for an investigation by the Scottish Parliament's Education, Children and Young People Committee, who questioned Mathieson on 4 June but found some responses evasive; parts of Sir Peter's evidence were then rebutted in writing by members of the Senate and by the joint unions. University management were further criticised by individual MSPs when expenditure of £750,000 on management consultants was revealed.

In April 2026, members of Senate requisitioned a special meeting to address senior leaders' continued non-compliance with a motion passed in December 2025 demanding detailed information relating to the "Academic Size and Shape" restructuring project. UCU, the trade union representing academic staff declared an industrial dispute over the planned job cuts, starting a marking boycott in May 2026. In response, university managers withheld all pay from boycotters even where marking formed a small part of their duties, and threatened the same for non-striking staff refusing to take on additional workloads to cover striking colleagues. Dissertation marking was also reportedly reallocated to anonymous external assessors without the usual quality controls.

Mathieson further refused to implement Senate motions from December 2025 and May 2026 which resolved to hold elections for conveners of senate standing committees governing key academic functions (Education, Academic Policy and Regulations, and Quality Assurance) of the university. Instead, Mathieson proposed "unilaterally to make committee appointments contrary to Senate's express vote". The university's senior managers were also accused of breaching the Universities (Scotland) Act 1966 by reorganising the College of Medicine and Veterinary Medicine in 2025 without the recommendation of the Academic Senate.

In October 2026, Mathieson announced that he will leave his position as Principal and Vice-Chancellor of the University of Edinburgh at the end of his second term in early 2028. He and his leadership team were publicly accused of "maladministration" following mass programme closures and internal circulation of an unofficial report on governance in autumn 2026.

In addition to his role as Principal, Mathieson has lectured to undergraduate medical students on his specialism in kidney disease at Edinburgh.

== Research ==
According to Mathieson's profile on the University of Bristol website:

[Mathieson's] major clinical interest is in autoimmune renal diseases, such as glomerulonephritis, systemic vasculitis, systemic lupus erythematosus. His research interests are in human glomerular cell biology and regulation of glomerular permeability, and he leads the group in the Academic Renal Unit that in recent years has made significant contributions to the study of podocytes and glomerular endothelial cells, interactions between them and factors in the causation and treatment of proteinuria. The work of the group has attracted major research grant funding of about £5 million from sources including Medical Research Council, Wellcome Trust and Kidney Research UK.

== Honours ==
Mathieson was knighted in the 2023 New Year Honours for services to higher education.

== Notes and references ==
=== References ===
Academic offices
Preceded by Sir Timothy O'Shea	Principal of the University of Edinburgh; 2018 – present	Incumbent
Preceded by Tsui Lap-chee	Vice-Chancellor and President of the University of Hong Kong; 2014 – 2017	Succeeded by Xiang Zhang
