= Xiang Zhang =

Chinese-American engineer (born 1963)

Xiang Zhang JP
- 张翔
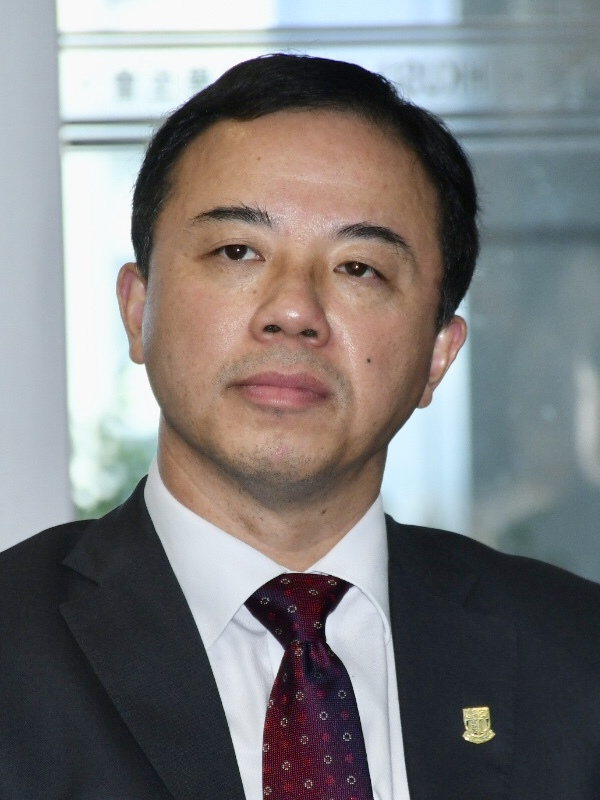
- Zhang in 2018

16th President and Vice-Chancellor of the University of Hong Kong
- Incumbent
- Assumed office July 2018
- Chancellor: Carrie Lam; John Lee Ka-chiu
- Preceded by: Peter Mathieson

Personal details
- Born: December 1963 (age 62) Nanjing, Jiangsu, China
- Education: Nanjing University (BS, MS); University of Minnesota (MS); University of California, Berkeley (PhD)
- Occupation: Academic administrator
- Profession: Materials scientist, optical engineer, physicist
- Scientific career
- Fields: materials physics, metamaterials and nano-photonics
- Workplaces: Pennsylvania State University; University of California, Los Angeles; University of California, Berkeley; University of Hong Kong
- Thesis: Pulsed laser micro-processing of advanced electronic materials and related transport issues (1996)
- Doctoral advisor: Costas Grigoropoulos

Xiang Zhang
- Simplified Chinese: 张翔
- Traditional Chinese: 張翔
Transcriptions
Standard Mandarin
- Hanyu Pinyin: Zhāng Xiáng

Zhang Xiang JP (Chinese: 张翔; pinyin: Zhāng Xiáng; born December 1963) is a Chinese-American mechanical engineer, currently serving as the 16th president and vice-chancellor of the University of Hong Kong since July 2018.

Zhang was the inaugural Ernest S. Kuh Endowed Chaired Professor at the University of California, Berkeley in the United States, the director of the National Science Foundation Nano-scale Science and Engineering Center, the director of materials science division, and a senior faculty scientist at the Lawrence Berkeley National Laboratory.

== Education ==
Zhang received a Bachelor of Science and a Master of Science from Nanjing University, as well as a Master of Science from the University of Minnesota. He received a Doctor of Philosophy from the University of California, Berkeley in 1996.

== Research results ==
Research mainly focuses on nanoscience and technology, materials physics, photonics and biotechnology. He developed the world's first "metalens" and demonstrated the imaging effect that broke through the diffraction limit of light for the first time. He also invented "plasmon lithography technology" and promoted the development of nanoscale manufacturing.

== Career ==
From 1996 to 1999, he was assistant professor at the Pennsylvania State University and from 1999 to 2004, associate professor and then full professor at the University of California, Los Angeles, before joining the University of California, Berkeley. Zhang is an elected member of the United States National Academy of Engineering and of Academia Sinica, a foreign member of the Chinese Academy of Sciences, and a Fellow of the American Physical Society, the Optical Society of America (OSA), American Association for the Advancement of Science and The International Society for Optical Engineering.

Zhang published more than 390 journal papers. His research focuses on materials physics, metamaterials and nano-photonics.

On 15 December 2017, the University of Hong Kong appointed Zhang to the posts of president and vice-chancellor. It was the first time a candidate born and educated to undergraduate degree level in mainland China had been so appointed. He assumed office in July 2018.

== Events ==
On 3 July 2019, in a statement in response to the Storming of the Legislative Council Complex two days earlier, Zhang said that he had been "disheartened by the violence" and that he "would like to condemn such acts". In response to a backlash from some 2,000 HKU students, alumni and staff, he stated on 11 July that he opposed violence "by any party, and at any juncture". Zhang agreed to a request by the HKU Student Union to participate in a forum open to students, staff, alumni and the media.

In April 2021, the Hong Kong University Students' Union criticized Zhang, and said that he was promoting national security education as a "political task" and was "destroying the autonomy of institutions."

In October 2023, Zhang was accused by whistleblowers of potential misconduct, including the purchase of a HK$2 million (US$255,370) BMW vehicle without going through an open tender.

== Academic awards ==
- 1997 NSF CAREER Award
- 1998 SME Dell K. Allen Outstanding Young Manufacturing Engineer Award
- 1999 ONR Young Investigator Award
- 2004 to 2009 Chancellor's Professorship, UC Berkeley
- 2008 Time Magazine: "Top Ten Scientific Discoveries of the Year" and 50 Best Inventions of the Year"
- 2009 Rohsenow Lecturer, Massachusetts Institute of Technology
- 2011 Fred Kavli Distinguished Lectureship, Materials Research Society
- 2011 Miller Professorship, UC Berkeley
- 2011 Distinguished Visiting Scientist, University of Toronto
- 2012 William Reynolds Lecturer, Stanford University
- 2014 Fitzroy Medal
- 2015 Charles Russ Richards Memorial Award
- 2016 Max Born Award
- 2016 Julius Springer Award for Applied Physics
- 2016 Excellence Award in Scientific Leadership
- 2017 A. C. Eringen Medal
- 2017 George W. Pearsall Distinguished Lecturer, Duke University
- 2017 John R. and Donna S. Hall Engineering Lecturer, Vanderbilt University
- 2017 John and Virginia Towers Distinguished Lecturer, Michigan Technology University
- 2019 Physics World: Top 10 Breakthroughs for 2019
- 2021 SPIE Mozi Award

== Honours ==
- 1 July 2019: Justice of the Peace
