= Ian Rees Davies =

Professor William Ian Rees Davies SBS

Vice-Chancellor of the University of Hong Kong
- In office 2000–2002
- Preceded by: Patrick Yiu-Chung Cheng
- Succeeded by: Tsui Lap-chee

Personal details
- Born: 24 May 1942
- Died: 24 July 2014 (aged 72); London, England

William Ian Rees Davies (Chinese: 戴義安, 24 May 1942 – 24 July 2014) was the Vice-Chancellor of the University of Hong Kong in 2000–2002. He died of kidney failure in 2014.

Academic offices
Preceded by Patrick Yiu-Chung Cheng	Vice-Chancellor and President of the University of Hong Kong; 10 November 2000 – 31 August 2002	Succeeded by Tsui Lap-chee
