= Lap-Chee Tsui =

Hong Kong academic

The Honourable Lap-Chee Tsui GBM OC OOnt JP FRS FRSC
- 徐立之
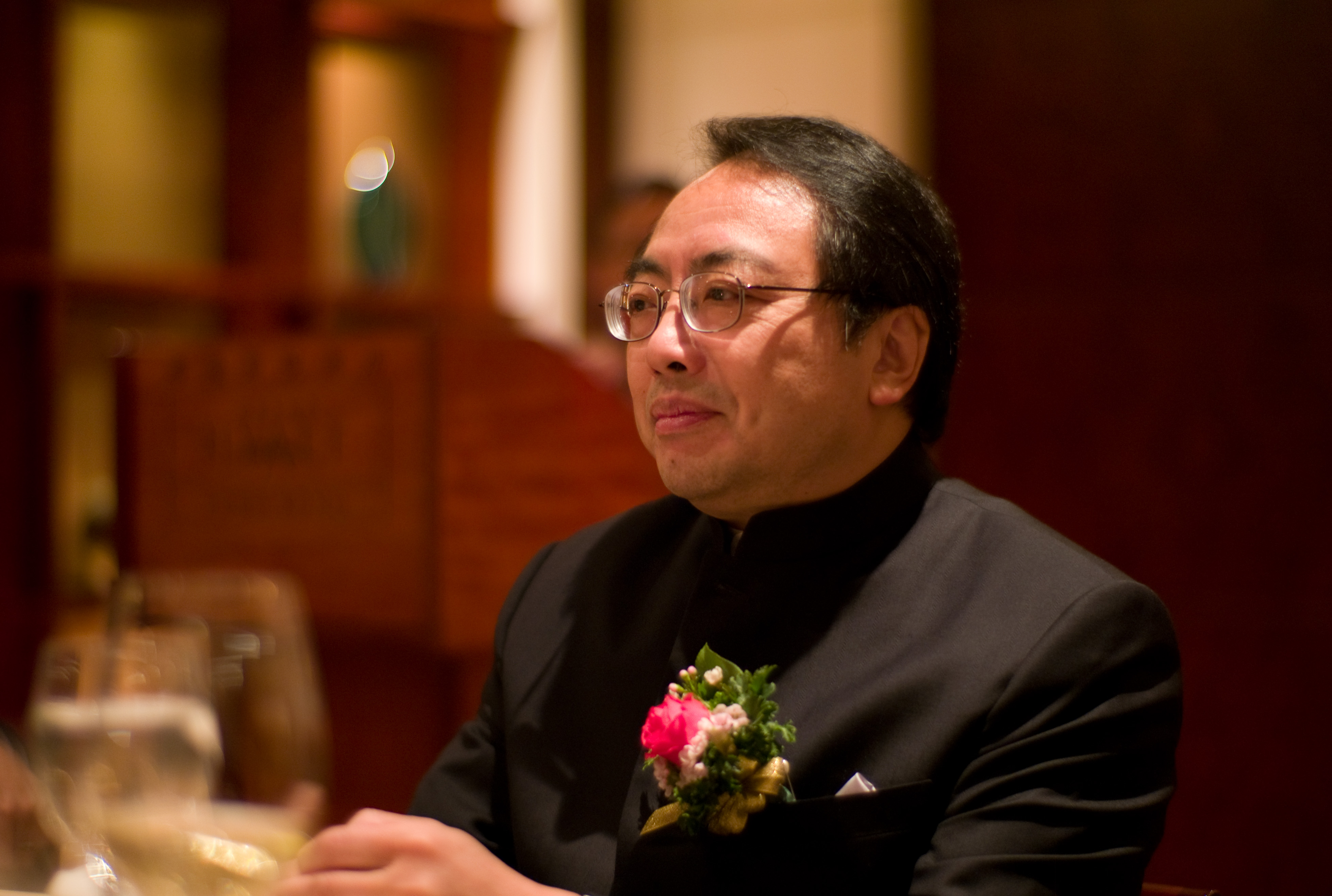

Vice-Chancellor and President of the University of Hong Kong
- In office 2002–2014
- Preceded by: Ian Rees Davies
- Succeeded by: Peter Mathieson

Personal details
- Born: 21 December 1950 (age 75) Shanghai, China
- Citizenship: China; Canada
- Education: Chinese University of Hong Kong (B.Sc., MPhil); University of Pittsburgh (Ph.D.)
- Known for: Identifying the defective gene, Cystic fibrosis transmembrane conductance regulator

Lap-Chee Tsui GBM OC OOnt JP FRS FRSC (Chinese: 徐立之; pinyin: Xú Lìzhī; Jyutping: ceoi^{4} laap^{6} zi^{1}; born 21 December 1950) is a Chinese-born Canadian geneticist and served as the 14th Vice-Chancellor and President of the University of Hong Kong.

== Personal life ==
Tsui grew up in Kowloon, Hong Kong and attended Homantin Government Secondary School.

He studied Biology at the New Asia College of the Chinese University of Hong Kong and was awarded a B.Sc. and a M.Phil. in 1972 and 1974, respectively. Upon the recommendation of his mentor at the CUHK, he continued his graduate education in the United States and received his Ph.D. from the University of Pittsburgh in 1979. He became Postdoctoral Investigator and Postdoctoral Fellow in 1979 at Oak Ridge National Laboratory, Tennessee, then joined the Department of Genetics of the Hospital for Sick Children in Toronto in 1981.

== Career ==
From 1981 to 2002, Tsui continued his research and teaching in the Hospital for Sick Children and the University of Toronto alternatively. Prior to his appointment as the Vice-Chancellor, he was Geneticist-in-Chief and Head of the Genetics and Genomic Biology Program of the Research Institute at the Hospital for Sick Children and co-founder (with Dr. Steve Scherer) of The Centre for Applied Genomics. He was also the holder of the H.E. Sellers Chair in Cystic Fibrosis and University Professor at the University of Toronto. He was the President of Human Genome Organisation (HUGO), the international organisation of scientists involved in the Human Genome Project, from 2000 to 2002.

He has also served on the editorial boards for 20 international peer-reviewed scientific journals, numerous scientific review panels, and many national and international advisory committees, including the Medical Research Council of Canada, Canadian Genome Research Task Force Committee (chair), Scientific Steering Committee of the National Institute of Biological Science, Scientific Advisory Committee of the China National Center for Biotechnology Development and Human Genome Organisation. He is currently member of the Judicial Officers Recommendation Commission, Council for Sustainable Development and executive committee, and executive committee of the Commission on Strategic Development of the Hong Kong SAR Government.

He was appointed vice-chancellor of the University of Hong Kong (HKU) in May 2002 and assumed office as the fourteenth vice-chancellor of the university with effect from 1 September 2002. As of October 2011, he had decided not to seek re-appointment. He served until October 2013.

== Academic contributions ==
Tsui became internationally acclaimed in 1989 when he and his team identified the defective gene, namely Cystic fibrosis transmembrane conductance regulator (CFTR), that causes cystic fibrosis, which is a major breakthrough in human genetics. He has also made significant contributions to the study of the human genome, especially the characterisation of chromosome 7, and, identification of additional disease genes.

== Honours and awards ==
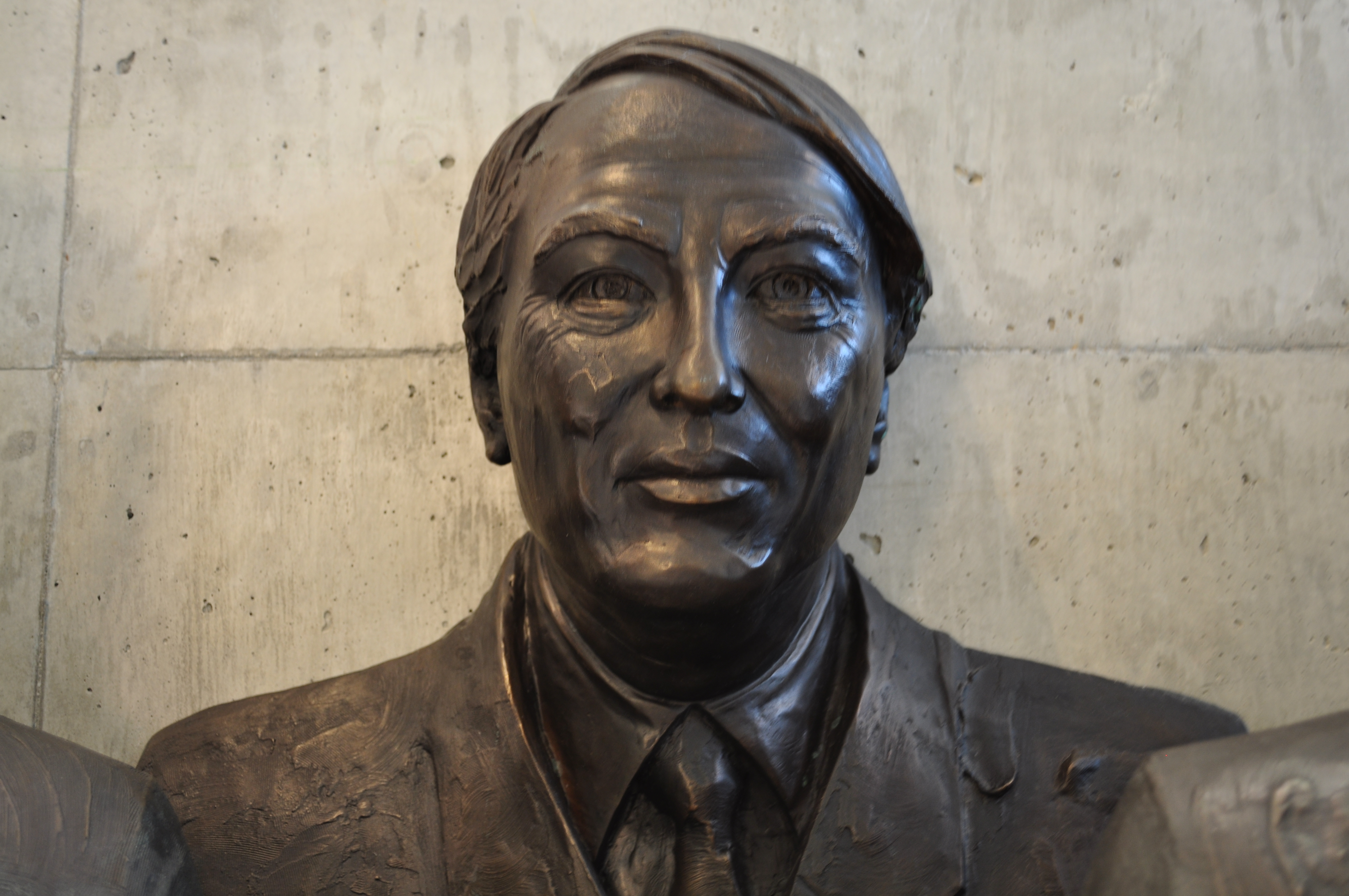
Bust of Tsui Lap-Chee at the Donnelly Centre, University of Toronto

Tsui has received numerous awards and honours for his outstanding work over the years. His honours include the titles of Distinguished Scientist of the Medical Research Council of Canada, Fellow of the Royal Society of Canada, Fellow of the Royal Society of London, Fellow of Academia Sinica, Foreign Associate of the National Academy of Sciences (US), Honorary Fellow of Royal College of Physicians (UK) and Honorary Fellow of World Innovation Foundation.

In addition to many national and international prizes, including the Killam Prize by the Canada Council for the Arts, Gairdner International Award, Elliott Cresson Medal of Franklin Institute, and Mead Johnson Award, he was awarded honorary doctoral degrees by the University of Toronto, University of King's College, University of New Brunswick, Chinese University of Hong Kong, St. Francis Xavier University, York University, Tel Aviv University and University of Western Ontario.

In 1991, he was made an Officer of the Order of Canada, and in October 2007, he was decorated as Knight of the Légion d'Honneur of France. He also received the Order of Ontario and the title of Justice of the Peace (HKSAR) from the Hong Kong SAR Government. In 2012, he was inducted into the Canadian Medical Hall of Fame. He is an inductee into the Etobicoke Hall of Fame.

In 2006, the fifth floor of the University of Toronto's Donnelly Centre for Cellular and Biomolecular Research was named after Tsui Lap-chee to honour his research work.

== Controversy ==
Tsui became the centre of controversy following Chinese Vice-Premier Li Keqiang's visit to the centenary ceremony of Hong Kong University on 18 August 2011. During the Vice Premier's visit, police used what a review concluded was unnecessary and unjustifiable force to push some students into a stairwell away from the Vice-Premier. Tsui was later accused by the students of pandering to the Chinese central government and failing to protect both the freedom of speech and expression, as well as academic freedoms of students.

In a statement to the HKU community, Tsui admitted that the security arrangements could have been better planned and organised. He also apologised to the university's students and alumni for not having been able to prevent the unfortunate incident. He assured them that "the University campus belongs to students and teachers and it will always remain a place for freedom of expression."

Academic offices
Preceded by Ian Rees Davies	Vice-Chancellor and President of the University of Hong Kong; 1 September 2002 – 31 March 2014	Succeeded by Peter Mathieson
