= Lingnan University =

Public university in New Territories, Hong Kong

Coordinates: 22.41°N 113.983°E

- 嶺南大學
- Motto: 作育英才，服務社會; Education for Service
- Type: Public
- Established: 1888; 138 years ago
- Academic affiliations: AACBS; AALAU; ACUCA; ASAIHL; ACUCA; BHUA; GHMUA; GLAA
- Chairman: Yao Cho-fai Andrew, BBS, JP
- Chancellor: John Lee Ka-chiu
- President: S. Joe Qin
- Academic staff: 371 (2024–2025)
- Students: 7,549 (2024–2025)
- Location: 8 Castle Peak Road, Tuen Mun, New Territories, Hong Kong, Tuen Mun, Hong Kong
- Colours: Red and Grey
- Website: ln.edu.hk

Chinese name
- Traditional Chinese: 嶺南大學
- Simplified Chinese: 岭南大学
- Cantonese Yale: Líhng nàahm daaih hohk
Transcriptions
Standard Mandarin
- Hanyu Pinyin: Lǐngnán Dàxué
Yue: Cantonese
- Yale Romanization: Líhng nàahm daaih hohk
- Jyutping: Ling^{5} naam^{4} daai^{6} hok^{6}

Lingnan College
- Traditional Chinese: 嶺南學院
- Simplified Chinese: 岭南学院
- Cantonese Yale: Líhng nàahm hohk yuhn
Transcriptions
Standard Mandarin
- Hanyu Pinyin: Lǐngnán Xuéyuàn
Yue: Cantonese
- Yale Romanization: Líhng nàahm hohk yuhn
- Jyutping: Ling^{5} naam^{4} hok^{6} jyun^{6}

University rankings

Global – Overall
- QS World: 581 (2027)
- THE World: 257 (2027)

Regional – Overall
- QS Asia: =188 (2025)
- THE Asia: 84 (2026)

Lingnan University is one of the eight UGC‑funded public universities in Hong Kong, located in Tuen Mun, New Territories. It is recognized for its emphasis on high‑quality education, small class sizes, and global engagement, and is a leading institution in the humanities, business, and social sciences, with its digital transformation and interdisciplinary strengths.

Lingnan University adopts a research-intensive liberal arts education model that integrates Chinese and Western academic traditions, with a strong focus on whole‑person education. Beyond academic training, the University aims to nurture graduates with critical thinking skills, ethical values, and a strong sense of social responsibility, equipping them to navigate in the digital era and contribute meaningfully to society.

Lingnan University has set a strategic goal to become a research‑oriented liberal arts university in the digital era, advancing excellence in teaching, learning, research, and community engagement. Guided by its mission of “Education for Service”, Lingnan seeks to enhance interdisciplinary scholarship, global connectivity, and societal impact while maintaining its distinctive liberal arts character.

Lingnan University comprises three Faculties, three Schools, 21 academic departments, 19 research institutes and centres as well as two language centres. The University offers more than 30 undergraduate programmes across a broad range of disciplines, with a strong focus on student–faculty interaction facilitated by its small‑class teaching model. Lingnan has established a research institute in Shenzhen to focus on knowledge transfer in the Greater Bay Area.

In addition to undergraduate education, Lingnan provides a diverse portfolio of taught master’s programmes, research master’s degrees, and PhD programmes. As of Term 1 of 2025/26, the University’s total student population exceeded 8,000.

Lingnan University also offers 11 dual and double degree programmes at the taught postgraduate and doctoral levels, in collaboration with universities and institutions in the mainland China, Europe, North America, and Asia.

== History ==
Lingnan University traces its origins to 1888, when the Christian College in China was founded in Guangzhou by the American Presbyterian Church. The College admitted its first cohort of 30 students on 28 March 1888. In 1893, it became independent of the Church and was governed by a board of trustees based in New York. Amid political instability and growing anti‑foreign sentiment in China, the College temporarily relocated to Macau in 1900. In 1903, it adopted the English name Canton Christian College and the Chinese name 嶺南學堂 (ling5 naam4 hok6 tong4), marking the first use of the name “Lingnan.” The institution returned to Guangzhou in 1904, where it established a permanent campus at Kangle Cun, Henan.

During the early 20th century, the College expanded steadily. In 1912, its Chinese name was changed to Lingnan Xuexiao, and by 1918 it had begun offering university‑level programmes. Its academic standing gained international recognition, with overseas universities acknowledging the eligibility of Lingnan graduates for postgraduate study. In 1927, following regulatory changes introduced by the Nationalist Government, governance was transferred to a predominantly Chinese board of trustees, and the institution formally adopted the name Lingnan University. Its curriculum was broadened beyond arts and sciences to include disciplines such as agriculture, commerce, engineering, and medicine, alongside primary and secondary education. By the 1930s, Lingnan had become a prominent higher education institution in southern China.

The outbreak of the Second Sino-Japanese War in 1937 forced Lingnan University to relocate. In 1938, the University moved to Hong Kong, where it continued classes by leasing part of the campus of The University of Hong Kong. The College of Agriculture of Lingnan University operated a teaching and experimental farm in Lam Tei, Tuen Mun. Following the Japanese occupation of Hong Kong in 1941, the University relocated inland to Shaoguan and later to Meixian in Guangdong Province, maintaining teaching and research under difficult wartime conditions.

After Japan’s surrender in 1945, Lingnan University returned to its Guangzhou campus and underwent reconstruction. Under new leadership from 1948, the University experienced renewed academic development by recruiting many nationally renowned scholars from Northern China. However, nationwide higher education reforms implemented in 1952 led to the cessation of the operation of Lingnan University in mainland China. Its campus was reassigned to Sun Yat‑sen University, and its academic units were merged into existing or new institutions.

Efforts to revive Lingnan began in Hong Kong, led by alumni committed to preserving its educational legacy. In 1967, Lingnan College was established, initially operated from Lingnan Middle School at 15 Stubbs Road, Hong Kong. The College gradually expanded its facilities and academic offerings, gaining recognition from overseas universities. In 1978, Lingnan was formally recognised as a registered post‑secondary institution and began offering government‑subvented programmes under the Chinese name Lingnan Xueyuan.

Throughout the 1980s, Lingnan strengthened its academic foundations through curriculum reform, departmental restructuring, and the expansion of general education and social science programmes. External academic reviews in the late 1980s concluded that Lingnan’s academic standards were comparable to those of institutions funded by the University and Polytechnic Grants Committee (UPGC). In 1991, Lingnan was approved as a degree‑conferring institution, launching its first bachelor’s degree programmes in translation and social sciences. Additional degree programmes in Chinese and business administration followed in 1994.

To support further development, Lingnan relocated to its present campus in Tuen Mun in 1995. The University was granted self‑accrediting status in 1998, and in 1999 it was formally renamed Lingnan University, restoring its historical university title. Entering the 21st century, Lingnan expanded its postgraduate offerings and reinforced its distinctive liberal arts education model, introducing initiatives such as the Integrated Learning Programme to promote whole‑person development.

In 2023, a new chapter began in Lingnan University's history with the appointment of Professor S. Joe QIN as President. His leadership marked the beginning of a transformative era, steering the University toward becoming a comprehensive institution in arts and sciences for the digital age, with a strong emphasis on impactful research and innovation. Institutional reforms strengthened leadership and governance, while new academic units and research platforms were established, including the Wu Jieh Yee School of Interdisciplinary Studies, the Lingnan Institute for Advanced Study, the School of Data Science, and the Lingnan HPC NexT high performance computing centre.

List of Presidents of Lingnan University since 1888:

Year	Supervisor / President	Tenure
1888 - 1893	Andrew P. Happer (哈巴)	Canton Christian College (格致書院) in Guangzhou
1893 - 1895	Benjamin C. Henry (香便文)	Canton Christian College (格致書院) in Guangzhou
1896 - 1899	Henry V. Noyes (那夏理)	Canton Christian College (格致書院) in Guangzhou
1899 - 1907	Oscar F. Wisner (尹士嘉)	Canton Christian College; Lingnan Academy (嶺南學堂) in Guangzhou and Macao
1908 - 1924	Charles K. Edmunds (晏文士)	Lingnan Academy; Lingnan School (嶺南學校) in Guangzhou
1924 - 1927	James McClure Henry (香雅各)	Lingnan School in Guangzhou
1927 - 1937	CHUNG Wing-kwong (鐘榮光)	Lingnan University (嶺南大學) in Guangzhou
1938 - 1948	LEE Ying-lam (李應林)	Lingnan University in Guangzhou and Hong Kong
1948 - 1952	CHEN Su-ching (陳序經)	Lingnan University in Guangzhou
1952 - 1967	—N/a	Merged under Sun Yat-sen University in Guangzhou (廣州中山大學)
1967 - 1968	Nai-hsin CHIEN (錢乃信); Howard G. Rhoads (Acting) (路考活)	Lingnan College (嶺南書院) in Hong Kong
1968 - 1969	Howard G. Rhoads (Acting) (路考活)	Lingnan College (嶺南書院) in Hong Kong
1969 - 1972	James K.C. JUAN (阮康成)	Lingnan College (嶺南書院) in Hong Kong
1972 - 1973	Yuk-chau MAK (Acting) (麥吳玉洲)	Lingnan College (嶺南書院) in Hong Kong
1973 - 1981	Raymond HUANG (黃勵文)	Lingnan College (嶺南書院 / 嶺南學院) in Hong Kong
1981 - 1983	Chi-to HUANG (黃啟鐸)	Lingnan College (嶺南學院) in Hong Kong
1983 - 1995	John T.S. CHEN (陳佐舜)	Lingnan College (嶺南學院) in Hong Kong
1995 - 2007	Edward CHEN Kwan-yiu (陳坤耀)	Lingnan College (嶺南學院); Lingnan University (嶺南大學) in Hong Kong
2007 - 2013	CHAN Yuk-shee (陳玉樹)	Lingnan University in Hong Kong
2013 - 2023	Leonard K CHENG (鄭國漢)	Lingnan University in Hong Kong
2023 – Present	S. Joe QIN (秦泗釗)	Lingnan University in Hong Kong

== Campus ==
=== Main Campus ===
Lingnan University is located in the Fu Tei area of Tuen Mun, Hong Kong, at 8 Castle Peak Road, on an 11‑hectare campus. Situated about 2 km north of Tuen Mun Town Centre, the University combines modern academic facilities with a scenic and relatively quiet environment, while enjoying convenient access to public transport, including the MTR (Siu Hong Station) and the Light Rail. The establishment of the Shenzhen Bay Control Point has further enhanced connectivity with the Guangdong–Hong Kong–Macao Greater Bay Area (GBA), facilitating academic exchange and enabling easier travel for students from mainland China.

Chan Tak Tai Auditorium
Opened in 1999, it serves as the central venue for cultural activities at Lingnan University.
The auditorium is divided into two levels, with box seats and stalls seating, accommodating up to 1,030 people. It is equipped with a comprehensive rigging system and advanced sound and lighting facilities. The auditorium is suitable for hosting a wide range of cultural performances, seminars, and university events.

Patrick Lee Wan Keung Academic Building
The Patrick Lee Wan Keung Academic Building is a five-storey, multi-purpose academic facility at Lingnan University. The ground floor houses several lecture theatres and a café, serving both academic and daily campus needs. From the first to the fifth floors, the building accommodates the Fong Sum Wood Library, the Chamber of Young Snow Art Exhibition Hall, the Leung Fong Oi Wan Art Gallery, and administrative departments. The University Library underwent a major renovation in recent years, enhancing its learning spaces, digital facilities, and study environment. The Art Gallery within the building regularly host exhibitions and cultural activities, contributing to campus life and promoting engagement with the arts.

Indoor Sports Complex
This is a two-storey indoor sports complex equipped with a variety of facilities, including:
- The multi-purpose Jackie Chan Gymnasium, which can be configured to accommodate six badminton courts, two volleyball courts, one basketball court, or one handball court.
- Two table tennis rooms.
- Two squash courts.
- The Mr and Mrs Lam Kau‑Yui Fitness Centre.
- One outdoor tennis court.
- The Tin Ka Ping Swimming Pool, a 50‑metre outdoor swimming pool.

Wu Jieh Yee Lingnan Hub
A building with staff quarters and co-working space that encourages interactions between staff and students, designed in accordance with the Sustainable Building Design Guidelines of the Buildings Department.

Lingnan Education Organization Building (under development)
The seven-storey Lingnan Education Organization Building, which will house the School of Data Science and the interdisciplinary research hub, further enhances Lingnan’s capabilities in AI, data science, and interdisciplinary research, aligning with Hong Kong’s promotion of new productivity forces.

=== Satellite Campuses ===
In addition to the Main Campus in Tuen Mun, Lingnan University has set up 2 satellite campus venues in Kowloon, supporting various teaching and research activities. In 2025, it acquired a property near the Main Campus to support teaching and learning and accommodate campus expansion.

Lingnan@WestKowloon
The flagship M+ Off-campus Learning Hub in the West Kowloon Cultural District boasts a 30,000-square-foot facility designed to meet diverse needs. It features a variety of spaces, including classrooms, lecture halls, study rooms, studios, discussion zones, conference and event areas, and dedicated office spaces for staff.

Union Park Learning Centre
The off-campus learning centre is located on the 6th and 9th floors of Union Park Centre in Prince Edward, Kowloon.

T-Plus
This recently acquired property is a 15-minute walk from the main campus in Tuen Mun, making it easy for users to commute while staying connected to campus life.

== Research ==
Lingnan's research in humanities, social sciences and business were classified as "World Leading" (4-star) and "Internationally Excellent" (3-star) in the Research Assessment Exercise 2020, conducted by the University Grants Committee using international benchmarks to identity the areas of relative strengths of the city's public universities. Lingnan came first or second among all public universities in terms of the percentage of "World Leading" research work in Accountancy, Sociology & Anthropology, Social Work & Social Policy, and Philosophy.

== Academic Organisations ==
=== Faculty of Arts ===
- Department of Chinese
- Department of Cultural Studies
- Department of English
- Department of Translation
- Department of History
- Department of Philosophy
- Department of Digital Arts and Creative Industries
- Two language centres:
  - Centre for English and Additional Languages (CEAL)
  - Chinese Language Education and Assessment Centre (CLEAC)
- Six research Centres:
  - Centre for Cultural Research and Development
  - Centre for Environmental History and Development
  - Centre for Film and Creative Industries
  - Hong Kong and South China Historical Research Programme
  - Hong Kong Catastrophic Risk Centre
  - The Advanced Institute for Global Chinese Studies

=== Faculty of Business ===
- Department of Accountancy
- Department of Operations and Risk Management
- Department of Finance
- Department of Management
- Department of Marketing and International Business
- Six research Centres:
  - Hong Kong Institute of Business Studies (HKIBS)
  - Lingnan University-Guangdong University of Technology Research Centre for eBusiness and Logistics
  - Lingnan University-South China University of Technology Joint Research Centre for Management and Decision Sciences
  - Dr Raymond Wong Research Centre for Arts Technology and Business
  - Lingnan University-Jinan University Joint Research Centre for Financial Inclusion and Digital Economy
  - Institute of Insurance and Risk Management (IIRM)

=== Faculty of Social Sciences ===
- Department of Psychology
- Department of Economics
- Department of Government and International Affairs
- Department of Sociology and Social Policy
- Six Research Centres:
  - Centre for Competition Policy and Regulation (CCPR)
  - China Economic Research Programme (CERP)
  - Pan Sutong Shanghai-Hong Kong Economic Policy Research Institute (PSEI)
  - STEAM Education and Research Centre (SERC)
  - Wofoo Joseph Lee Consulting and Counselling Psychology Research Centre (WJLCCPRC)
  - Asia-Pacific Institute of Ageing Studies (APIAS)
  - The Public Governance Programme (PGP)

=== School of Data Science ===
- Division of Artiﬁcial Intelligence
- Division of Industrial Data Science
- LEO Dr. David P. Chan Institute of Data Science
- One Research Centre:
  - LEO Dr David P. Chan Institute of Data Science

=== Wu Jieh Yee School of Interdisciplinary Studies ===
- Division of Science
- Office of the Core Curriculum
- Wong Bing Lai Music and Performing Arts Unit

=== School of Graduate Studies ===
- Research Institute:
  - Institute of Policy Studies (IPS)
- Programme Clusters
  - Policy and Education Leadership Cluster
  - Regional Development and Urban Studies Cluster
  - Health, Ageing and Social Innovation Studies Cluster
- Central Administration Unit for postgraduate matters

=== Institutional Research Institutes/Centres ===
- Lingnan University Cognitive Science Research Centre
- Lingnan University Institute for Advanced Study
- Lingnan University Shenzhen Research Institute:
  - Lingnan University Creative and Cultural Innovation Research Institute

== Rankings and Reputations ==
=== Overall and Impact Rankings ===
In 2026, Lingnan University was ranked 63rd globally in the Times Higher Education (THE) Sustainability Impact Rankings, placing third among Hong Kong’s eight UGC-funded universities. The University was ranked 1st worldwide in Sustainable Development Goal (SDG4) : Quality Education for the second consecutive year, having first achieved this position in 2025.

In the 2026 Sustainability Impact Ratings, Lingnan was ranked within the global top 100 in seven SDGs: SDG 1: No Poverty (65th); SDG 4: Quality Education (1st); SDG 8: Decent Work and Economic Growth (27th); SDG 10: Reduced Inequalities (11th); SDG 11: Sustainable Cities and Communities (66th); SDG 15: Life on Land (64th); and SDG 17: Partnerships for the Goals (55th).

In the same edition, Lingnan was ranked first in Hong Kong in six SDGs: SDG 1: No Poverty; SDG 2: Zero Hunger; SDG 4: Quality Education; SDG 8: Decent Work and Economic Growth; SDG 10: Reduced Inequalities; and SDG 17: Partnerships for the Goals.

In other international rankings, Lingnan University was ranked 84th in the Times Higher Education Asia University Rankings in its debut year. In the QS World University Rankings 2027, Lingnan was ranked 581st globally, an increase of 120 places from the previous year.

==== Subject/Area Ranking ====
===== QS Subject Ranking =====
In the QS World University Rankings by Subject 2026:

Subject	Lingnan’s World Rank
Philosophy	151-200
Communication and Media Studies	151-200
English Language and Literature	201-250
Sociology	251-300
Economics and Econometrics	301-350
Education and Training	351-400
Arts and Humanities	401-450
Business and Management Studies	501-550
Computer Science and Information Systems	701-750

===== GRAS (ARWU subject rankings) =====
In the 2025 Global Ranking of Academic Subjects (GRAS):

Subject	Lingnan’s World Rank
Artificial Intelligence	151-200
Education	301-400
Management	401-500

===== THE Subject Ranking =====
In the Times Higher Education World University Rankings by Subjects (2025):

Subject	Lingnan’s World Rank
Social Sciences	201-250
Arts and Humanities	301-400
Business and Economics	301-400
Psychology	301-400

=== Global Engagements and Partnerships ===
Lingnan University maintains a strong international outlook, with over 280 partner institutions across more than 50 countries and regions. . Through exchange programmes and short‑term summer and winter programmes, over 80% of undergraduate students gain international exposure during their studies.

In 2025, Lingnan University became the first higher education institution in Asia to establish a United Nations University (UNU) Hub on Humanitarian Innovation and Technology (HIT). The official plaque‑unveiling ceremony was held on 25 October 2025, marking a new phase of collaboration between Lingnan University and the UNU to support practical solutions for developing regions.

=== Research Achievements ===
Lingnan University’s academic profile includes faculty members whose research impact has received international recognition. In 2025, more than 20% of Lingnan’s faculty were listed among the World’s Top 2% Scholars, as identified by Stanford University, with 19 among the global top 100 in their respective fields. Additionally, three distinguished Lingnan scholars were named Highly Cited Researchers 2025 by Clarivate.

At the 51st International Exhibition of Inventions Geneva 2026, Lingnan University achieved record-breaking results, with all 13 of its submitted projects winning awards. The University received one Gold Medal with Congratulations of the Jury, five Gold Medals, three Silver Medals, and four Bronze Medals. One project, “FlexiBot: Make Every Parking Spot a Charging Spot”, also earned the “Thailand Award for the Best International Invention and Innovation” from the National Research Council of Thailand, bringing the total number of awards to 14. Both the number of projects entered and the awards received more than doubled compared to last year, setting a new institutional record and highlighting Lingnan’s excellence in interdisciplinary, AI-driven innovation and human-centred research with strong societal impact.

In 2026, Lingnan University won a total of 16 awards at the Silicon Valley International Invention Festival 2026, including 8 Gold Medals, 6 Silver Medals, and 2 Special Awards. All 14 research projects exhibited by the University received awards. The winning projects covered a wide range of fields, including artificial intelligence, medicine, energy and environmental sustainability, data privacy protection, blockchain, the Internet of Things, education, and game creation, and included research and applications related to Lingnan's promotion of the interdisciplinary development of "Liberal Arts + Technology" and "AI +". Based on the results of this year's competition, Lingnan University was the higher education institution in Hong Kong that received the highest number of awards and Gold Medals for the second consecutive year.

== Renowned Faculty Members ==
=== Scholars ===
Name	Research areas and achievements
Prof S.Joe QIN (秦泗釗)	Specializing in industrial engineering and automation, he ranks first in Hong Kong and China in “Industrial Engineering & Automation” (Stanford Top 2% Scientists 2025) and has received over 43,000 citations.
Prof Raymond Hon-fu CHAN (陳漢夫)	With a research focus on numerical and computational mathematics, he ranks second in Hong Kong in “Numerical & Computational Mathematics” (Stanford Top 2% Scientists 2025) and was the first Asian scholar elected to the SIAM Council.
Prof Xin YAO (姚新)	An expert in artificial intelligence and image processing, he is ranked first in Hong Kong and fifth in China in “Artificial Intelligence & Image Processing” (Stanford Top 2% Scientists 2025) and has received the IEEE Evolutionary Computation Pioneer Award.
Prof Sam Tak-wu KWONG (鄺得互)	Renowned for his work in video coding and multi-objective optimization, he has been a Clarivate Highly Cited Researcher since 2023 and is an IEEE Fellow in recognition of his contributions to cybernetics (Stanford Top 2% Scientists 2025).
Prof Richard Walker	Dedicated to political science and public administration, he is ranked first in Hong Kong and China in “Political Science & Public Administration” according to the Stanford Top 2% Scientists lists for 2024 and 2025.
Prof Ngai PUN (潘毅)	An expert in cultural studies, and the first Asian scholar to receive the C. Wright Mills Award. This scholar is ranked among the top 2% of scientists globally by Stanford University, holding the No. 2 rank in Cultural Studies within China and Hong Kong. Their research focuses on global production discourse and its social impact.
Prof Yongduan SONG (宋永端)	With a research focus on industrial engineering and automation, he ranks among the top 100 globally in his field (Stanford Top 2% Scientists 2025) and is a fellow of IEEE.

Lingnan University has conferred honorary degrees on distinguished individuals from various fields in recognition of their contributions to society, academia, public service, and industry.

== Student Life ==
=== Student Body ===
For the 2024–25 academic year, Lingnan University enrolled over 7,500 undergraduate and postgraduate students. Among them, over 60% were non-local students (i.e. not holding Hong Kong citizenship).

Regarding student distribution by academic unit, the Faculty of Business is the largest, accounting for 28% of undergraduates and 33% of postgraduates. This is followed by the Faculty of Arts (34% of undergraduates; 12% of postgraduates), Faculty of Social Sciences (25% of undergraduates; 12% of postgraduates), School of Graduate Studies (28% of postgraduates), Wu Jieh Yee School of Interdisciplinary Studies (9% of undergraduates; 11% of postgraduates), and the School of Data Science (3% of undergraduates; 4% of postgraduates).

=== Student Residence ===
The ten blocks of student hostels in Lingnan University provide around 2,600 hostel places for our Lingnan students. In each hostel, there is a common room on the ground floor, residential floors, and quarters for wardens and senior tutors on the top floor. Tutor rooms are located on residential floors.

Area	Hostel	Room Types
Southern Hostels	William M W Mong Hall The Bank of East Asia Hall (Hall A)	Twin Room
Southern Hostels	Tsung Tsin Association Hall Fok Cho Min Hall (Hall B)	Twin Room
Southern Hostels	Chung Shun Yee Min Hall (Hall C)	Twin Room
Southern Hostels	Lam Woo Hall (Hall D)	Twin Room
Northern Hostels	The Jockey Club Student Village (Hall E-H)	Twin Room & Triple Room
334 Hostel	Wong Hoo Chuen Hall (WHC Hall)	Twin Room & Triple Room
334 Hostel	Wu Jieh Yee Hall (WJY Hall)	Twin Room & Triple Room

=== List of Registered Student Societies (2025–26) ===
Programme / Departmental / Faculty / School-based Student Societies

- Business Administration Programmes Society, Lingnan University
- Chinese Departmental Society, Lingnan University
- Cultural Studies Departmental Society, Lingnan University
- English Departmental Society, Lingnan University
- Social Sciences Faculty Society, Lingnan University
- Translation Departmental Society, Lingnan University

=== Student Hostel Associations ===
- William M. W. Mong Hall The Bank of East Asia Hall Student Hostel Association, Lingnan University
- Tsung Tsin Association Hall Fok Cho Min Hall Student Hostel Association, Lingnan University
- Chung Shun Yee Min Hall Student Hostel Association, Lingnan University
- Jockey Club Hall E Student Hostel Association, Lingnan University
- Wong Hoo Chuen Hall Student Hostel Association, Lingnan University
- Wu Jieh Yee Hall Student Hostel Association, Lingnan University

=== Student Groups serving Special University Functions ===
- Campus Crusade for Christ, Lingnan University
- Chinese Students and Scholars Association, Lingnan University
- Christian Student Association, Lingnan University
- Golden Z Club, Lingnan University
- Postgraduate Student Association, Lingnan University
- Toastmasters Club, Lingnan University
- University YMCA (Lingnan University)

=== Student / Interest Clubs ===
- Animation, Comics and Games Society, Lingnan University
- Basic Law Society, Lingnan University
- Dance Society, Lingnan University
- Digital Art Society, Lingnan University
- Drama Society, Lingnan University
- Model United Nations Society, Lingnan University
- Music Society, Lingnan University
- Photographic Society, Lingnan University
- Rotaract Club, Lingnan University

== Controversies ==
=== Student and alumni petition for dismissing Junius Ho from the University Council ===
In July 2019, a widely circulated video showed Junius Ho shaking hands, giving thumbs-up to, and taking photos with the white-clad mob that attacked protestors and bystanders in the 2019 Yuen Long attack. Ho claimed that he was only passing by after dinner and was not involved in the attack, and that the mob supported his pro-police stances and asked for photos with him. As Ho was a member of the Council of Lingnan University, a number of student bodies and alumni associations made a joint declaration accusing him of hate speech over the years and condemning his support for the attackers, saying that it seriously affected the image of the university. They also requested Chief Executive Carrie Lam, then-Chancellor of the university, to dismiss Ho from the Council. Afterwards, the university issued a statement emphasising its respect for freedom of speech and that Ho's views did not represent the university.

=== Removal of Tiananmen relief sculpture ===
On the night of 24 December 2021, the university removed from campus a relief sculpture created by artist Chen Weiming and commemorating the 1989 Tiananmen Square protests and massacre. The university said that it had "reviewed and assessed items on campus that may pose legal and safety risks to the University community" and had the relief "removed and stored appropriately... in the best interest of the University". Around the same time, the University of Hong Kong and The Chinese University of Hong Kong also removed similar Tiananmen memorial monuments from their campuses. Chen said that "it is a major regret", and that the university authorities "acted like a thief in the night" and "were very scared that the removal of the monuments would spark public outcry".

== Office of Service-Learning ==
In 2006, Lingnan University became the first local university to establish an Office of Service-Learning.

From 2007 to 2013, the Office of Service-Learning and Lingnan University jointly organised the biennial 1st to 4th Asia-Pacific Regional Conference on Service-Learning.

== See also ==
- Liberal Arts
- Lingnan University Library
- Education in Hong Kong
- List of universities in Hong Kong
- List of mainland Chinese schools reopened in Hong Kong
- List of buildings and structures in Hong Kong
