= List of Hong Kong University of Science and Technology people =

This list includes notable graduates and professors affiliated with the Hong Kong University of Science and Technology (HKUST).

== Notable alumni ==
=== Politics ===
- Starry Lee, Hong Kong politician, chairperson of the largest pro-establishment Beijing-loyalist party, the Democratic Alliance for the Betterment and Progress of Hong Kong (DAB).
- Ben Chan, member of Hong Kong Legislative Council (Geographical constituency New Territories West) and was a member of Tsuen Wan District Council (Yeung Uk Road).
- Wong Pak-yu, member of the Yuen Long District Council.
- Lam Chun, Hong Kong social activist and member of the Yuen Long District Council for Shui Wah.

=== Academia ===
- Tinglong Dai, Professor of Operations Management and Business Analytics at the Carey Business School, Johns Hopkins University
- Panos Kalnis, professor of computer science at the King Abdullah University of Science and Technology.
- Hean Tat Keh (MBA 1993), Professor of Marketing and Director of Research (Marketing) at Monash University.
- Sun Binyong, academician of the Chinese Academy of Sciences (CAS).
- Xin Zhang, professor of mechanical engineering, electrical & computer engineering, biomedical engineering, materials science & engineering, and the Photonics Center at Boston University (BU).

=== Business ===
- Douglas Woo, chairman & managing director of Wheelock & Co. and managing director of its subsidiary Wheelock Properties and several other subsidiaries.
- Corinne Le Goff, director of companies in the pharmaceutical field.

=== Science and technology ===
- Frank Wang, billionaire entrepreneur, engineer, and the founder and CEO of the Shenzhen-based technology company DJI, the world's largest manufacturer of commercial drones.
- Chan Yik Hei, young entrepreneur in Hong Kong.
- Kaikit Wong, Fellow of the Institute of Electrical and Electronics Engineers (IEEE).

=== Entertainment ===
- Alfred Cheung, actor, director, writer and producer.
- Koni Lui, model and 2nd runner up at the Miss Hong Kong 2006 pageant. She represented Hong Kong at Miss International 2006 in Tokyo, Japan and Beijing, China.
- Myolie Wu, actress and singer.
- Angel Wong, TV and radio personality, host and columnist.

=== Sports ===
- Sam Whiteman, former New Zealand cricketer who played for Auckland in New Zealand domestic cricket. As of November 2012, he was a senior director at The Corporate Executive Board Company, having previously worked in positions with Virgin Money, ANZ, and the National Australia Bank.
- Chan Yuk Chi, former Hong Kong professional footballer. He is currently the head coach of Hong Kong First Division club Tai Po where he spent his entire playing career.

== Notable faculty ==
=== School of Business and Management ===
- Utpal Bhattacharya
- Jennifer Carpenter (academic)
- KC Chan
- Robert Helsley
- Christopher A. Pissarides
- Bruno Solnik

=== School of Engineering ===
- Ishfaq Ahmad (computer scientist)
- Satya N. Atluri
- Mansun Chan
- Leroy Chang
- Jing Kevin Chen
- Pascale Fung
- Daniel Palomar
- Pan Hui
- Wei Shyy
- Johnny Kin On Sin
- Kang L. Wang
- Derick Wood
- Qiang Yang
- Chik Patrick Yue
- Zhao Tianshou

=== School of Science ===
- Shiu-Yuen Cheng
- M. L. Chye
- Charles Clarke (botanist)
- Yuefan Deng
- Shengwang Du
- He Xuhua
- Jing-Song Huang
- Nancy Ip
- Li Jianshu
- Wu Yundong
- Zhang Mingjie

=== School of Humanities and Social Science ===
- Arif Dirlik
- Jack Goldstone
- Jean C. Oi
- Barry Sautman

== Presidents of HKUST ==
The following persons have served as president of The Hong Kong University of Science and Technology:

| No. | Image | President | Term start | Term end | Ref. |
|---|---|---|---|---|---|
| 1 | | Chia-Wei Woo | 1991 | 2001 | |
| 2 | | Paul Ching Wu Chu | 2001 | 2009 | |
| 3 | | Tony F. Chan | 2009 | 2018 | |
| 4 | | Wei Shyy | 2018 | 2022 | |
| 5 | | Nancy Ip | 2022 | present | |
