= Hui Xiong =

Chinese data scientist

- 熊辉
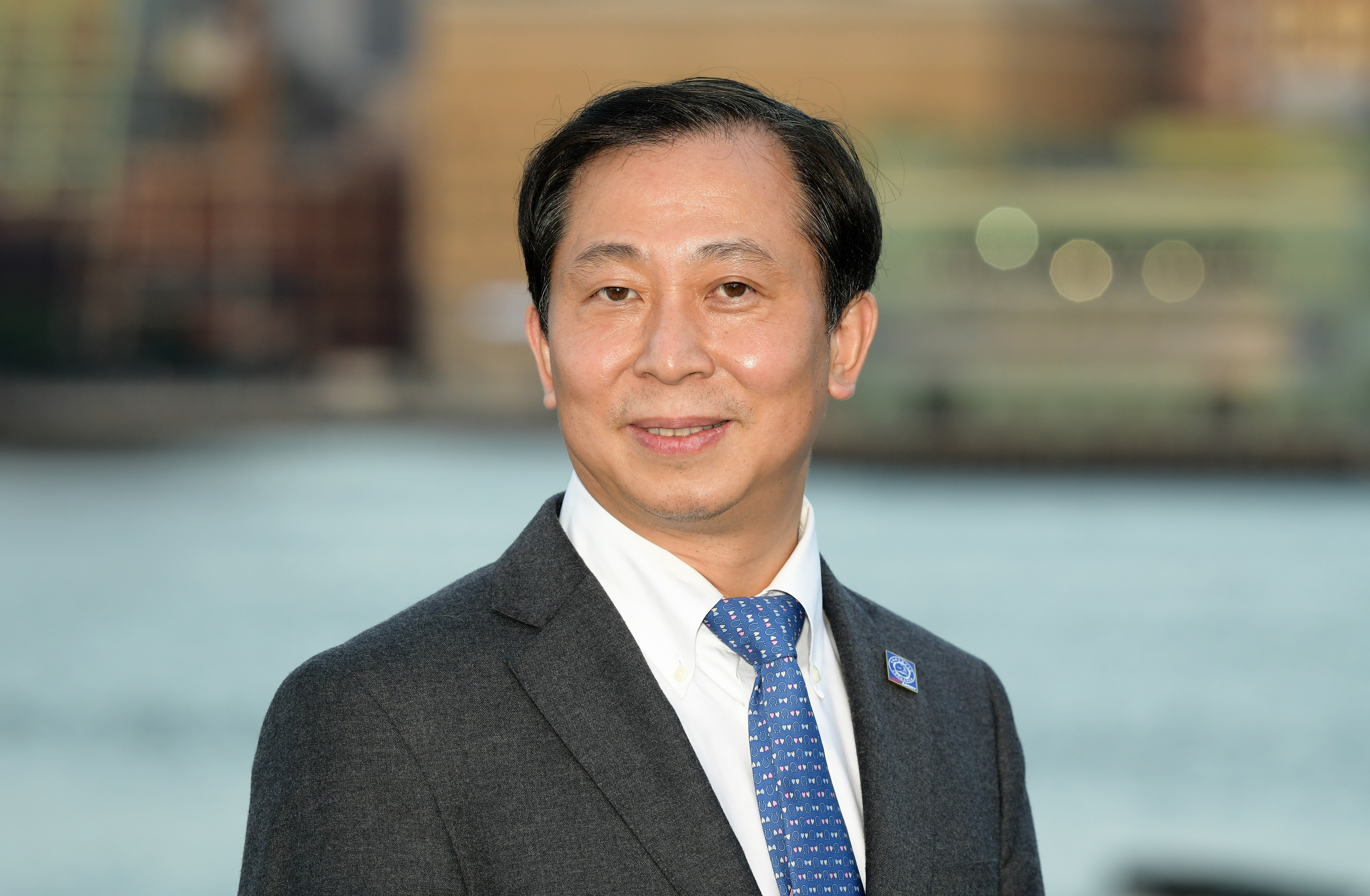
- Born: 1972 (age 53–54); Nanchang, China
- Education: University of Science and Technology of China (BE); National University of Singapore (MS); University of Minnesota (PhD)
- Known for: Artificial Intelligence; Data Science; Mobile Computing; Business Intelligence; Talent Intelligence; Information Assurance
- Awards: Junior Faculty Teaching Excellence Award, Rutgers Business School (2007), IBM ESA Innovation Award (2008), Rutgers University Board of Trustees Research Fellowship for Scholarly Excellence (2009), Second Prize of Unsupervised and Transfer Learning Challenge, ICML and IJCNN (2011), 2011 IEEE ICDM Best Research Paper Award (2011), ACM Distinguished Member (2014), IEEE ICDM Outstanding Service Award (2017), RBS Dean’s Research Professor (2016), The Ram Charan Management Practice Award as the Grand Prix winner, the Harvard Business Review (2018), IEEE Fellow (2020), AAAS Fellow (2020), Rutgers University Distinguished Professor (2021), AAAI Fellow (2025), ACM Fellow (2025), CCF Fellow (2025).
- Scientific career
- Workplaces: Hong Kong University of Science and Technology (Guangzhou)
- Website: https://hkustai.github.io/

Hui Xiong (Chinese: 熊辉; pinyin: Xióng Huī) is a Chinese data scientist. Xiong Hui holds esteemed positions at the Hong Kong University of Science and Technology (Guangzhou) as a Chair Professor, and Associate Vice President for Knowledge Transfer. Before joining HKUST(GZ), he was a Distinguished Professor at Rutgers University and held the position of Chief Scientist (Smart City) and Deputy Dean at Baidu Research Institute, overseeing five research labs. Xiong was also a distinguished guest professor (Grand Master Chair Professor) at the University of Science and Technology of China (USTC).

== Education ==
Xiong received his B.E. degree in automation from the University of Science and Technology of China and his M.S. degree in computer science from the National University of Singapore. He received his Ph.D. in computer science with a minor in statistics from the University of Minnesota - Twin Cities in 2005 under Vipin Kumar.

== Career ==
Xiong became an assistant professor in the management science and information systems department of Rutgers Business School – Newark and New Brunswick in 2005. He became an associate professor in the same place in 2009. In 2014, he became a full professor in the same place in 2014. He became a Rutgers Business School Dean's Research Professor in 2016. He became a distinguished professor in the same place in 2021.

Xiong served as deputy dean of Baidu Research Institute and the founding head of business intelligence lab as well as the founding head of talent intelligence center of Baidu Inc. while on leave from Rutgers University.

Xiong now holds esteemed positions at the Hong Kong University of Science and Technology (Guangzhou) as a Chair Professor, and Associate Vice President for Knowledge Transfer.

== Professional service ==
Xiong serves as Founding Editor-in-Chief of Nature npj Artificial Intelligence journal. Xiong also serves as a co-editor-in-chief of Encyclopedia of GIS. In addition, he is an associate editor of IEEE Transactions on Big Data (TBD), ACM Transactions on Knowledge Discovery from Data (TKDD) and ACM Transactions on Management Information Systems (TMIS). In 2018, Xiong served as a PC chair of the research track for the ACM Special Interest Group on Knowledge Discovery and Data Mining (SIGKDD). In 2013 and 2015, he was a general chair of the IEEE International Conference on Data Mining (ICDM). He also served as an industry and government track co-chair of the 18th ACM Special Interest Group on Knowledge Discovery and Data Mining (SIGKDD) in 2012.

== Books ==
- "Encyclopedia of GIS"
- "Hyperclique pattern discovery: Algorithms and applications"
- "Clustering and Information Retrieval"

== Media highlights ==
- "The Economist, Crime prevention Cutpurse capers"
- "The Ethics Of Big Data"
- "Dr Hui Xiong – Harnessing Big Data to Identify Ideal Locations for Warehouses and Bike Share Stations"

== Selected honors and distinctions ==
- CCF Fellow, 2025
- ACM Fellow, 2025
- AAAI Fellow, 2025
- Distinguished professor with tenure, Rutgers University, 2021.
- AAAI 2021 Best Paper Award, 2021
- AAAS Fellow, 2020
- IEEE Fellow, 2020
- The Ram Charan Management Practice Award as the Grand Prix winner, the Harvard Business Review, 2018
- RBS Dean’s Research Professor, 2016
- IEEE ICDM Outstanding Service Award, 2017.
- ACM Distinguished Member, 2014
- Dean’s Award for Meritorious Research, Rutgers Business School, 2010, 2011, 2013, 2015.
- 2011 IEEE ICDM Best Research Paper Award for the paper ”Personalized Travel Package Recommendation”, published at IEEE International Conference on Data Mining (one out of 786 submissions), 2011.
- Second Prize of Unsupervised and Transfer Learning Challenge, ICML and IJCNN, 2011.
- Rutgers University Board of Trustees Research Fellowship for Scholarly Excellence, 2009.
- IBM ESA Innovation Award, 2008.

== Graduated Ph.D. students ==
Xiong is also a mentor who has a record of producing Ph.D. students who have gone on to become faculty in major academic institutions. In particular, 11 out of 17 his Ph.D. graduates have become tenure-track professors in major research universities, such as the University of Arizona, Stony Brook University, George Mason University, University of Central Florida, the City University of Hong Kong, ESCP - Paris, University of Kansas and the University of Tennessee, Knoxville.

== See also ==
- Zhang Hongjiang
- Qiang Yang
- Yong Rui
- Harry Shum
- Hsiao-Wuen Hon
- Ya-Qin Zhang
- Xing Xie
