= Yong Rui =

CTO of Lenovo

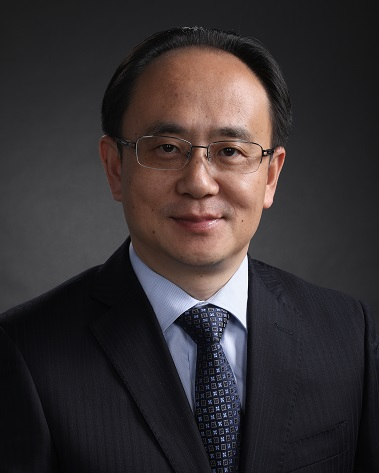
- Yong Rui, SVP & CTO of Lenovo
- Education: Southeast University (BS); Tsinghua University (MS); University of Illinois at Urbana-Champaign (PhD)
- Known for: SVP & CTO of Lenovo
- Awards: 2018 ACM SIGMM Technical Achievement Award; 2017 IEEE SMC Society Andrew P. Sage Best Transactions Paper Award; 2017 Association for Computing Machinery TOMM Nicolas Georganas Best Paper Award; 2016 IEEE Computer Society Edward J. McCluskey Technical Achievement Award; 2016 IEEE Signal Processing Society Best Paper Award; 2010 Journal of Visual Communication and Image Representation Most Cited Paper of the Decade Award; Foreign Member of Academia Europaea; ACM Fellow; IEEE Fellow; IAPR Fellow; SPIE Fellow
- Scientific career
- Fields: Artificial intelligence Multimedia analysis
- Workplaces: Lenovo; Microsoft Research Asia

Yong Rui is a Chinese business executive and scientist that is the chief technology officer (CTO) of Lenovo Group. He is in charge of Lenovo's technical strategy, research and development directions, and Lenovo Research, one of Lenovo's most important innovation engines.

== Education ==
Rui received his bachelor's degree from Southeast University, master's Degree from Tsinghua University, and PhD from University of Illinois at Urbana-Champaign (UIUC).

== Career ==
Before taking office as Lenovo CTO and SVP in November 2016, Rui had worked at Microsoft for 18 years. He started out as researcher and senior researcher of the Multimedia Collaboration group at Microsoft Research, Redmond, US (1999–2006). He then worked as director of Strategy (2006–2008), director of Microsoft Education Product in China (2008–2010), GM of Microsoft Asia-Pacific R&D (ARD) Group (2010–2012) and senior director and deputy managing director of Microsoft Research Asia (MSRA) (2012–2016).

== Research ==
Rui's areas of research include multimedia analysis, understanding, and retrieval, and artificial intelligence.

He has shipped numerous technologies and products at both Lenovo and Microsoft, including Lenovo LiCO, Lenovo ThinkCloud, Lenovo MOLI, Lenovo daystAR, Microsoft Bing Search (image search, video search and entity search), Microsoft XiaoIce, Microsoft Satori (entity graph), Microsoft Office (RoundTable, OneNote and Sway), Microsoft OneDrive (photo tagging), Microsoft Hololens (3D reconstruction), and Microsoft Cognitive Services on Azure (face, image and video analysis).

== Awards & Publications ==
Rui is a Fellow of the ACM, IEEE, IAPR, SPIE, a foreign member of Academia Europaea, and an International Fellow of the Canadian Academy of Engineering.

Rui won the 2018 ACM SIGMM Award for Outstanding Technical Contributions to Multimedia Computing, Communications and Applications and the 2017 ACM TOMM Nicolas D. Georganas Best Paper Award.

In 2016, Rui received the IEEE Computer Society Edward J. McCluskey Technical Achievement Award "for pioneering contributions to multimedia analysis and retrieval" and the IEEE Signal Processing Society Best Paper Award.

In 2010, he was honored with the Most Cited Paper of the Decade Award from the Journal of Visual Communication and Image Representation.

Rui holds 67 US and international issued patents and is a prolific author. He has published 4 books, 12 book chapters, and 260 referred journal and conference papers.

== Professional activities ==
Rui serves as the editor-in-chief of IEEE MultiMedia magazine, an associate editor of ACM Trans. on Multimedia Computing, Communication and Applications (TOMM), and is a founding editor of the International Journal of Multimedia Information Retrieval (IJMIR).

In addition, Rui was an executive member of ACM SIGMM and the founding chair of its China Chapter.

Rui was also a member of review panels for the US National Science Foundation (NSF), the National Natural Science Foundation of China (NSFC), the Australian Research Council, and the Research Grants Council of Hong Kong.

== See also ==
- Zhang Hongjiang
- Qiang Yang
- Hui Xiong
- Harry Shum
- Hsiao-Wuen Hon
- Ya-Qin Zhang
- Xing Xie
