= Lionel Ni =

- 倪明选

President of Hong Kong University of Science and Technology (Guangzhou)
- Incumbent
- Assumed office June 1, 2021
- Preceded by: Incumbent

Provost of Hong Kong University of Science and Technology
- In office May 16, 2019 – June 1, 2021
- President: Wei Shyy
- Preceded by: Wei Shyy
- Succeeded by: Guo Yike

Vice Rector (Academic Affairs) of the University of Macau
- In office January 2, 2015 – 2019
- Rector: Wei Zhao; Yonghua Song
- Preceded by: Simon S. M. Ho
- Succeeded by: Michael Hui

Personal details
- Born: December 13, 1951 (age 74)
- Scientific career
- Education: National Taiwan University (B.S.); Wayne State University (M.S.); Purdue University (Ph.D.)
- Awards: Overseas Outstanding Contribution Award, China Computer Federation
- Fields: Computer Science and Engineering
- Institutions: University of Macau; Hong Kong University of Science and Technology; United States National Science Foundation; Michigan State University

Lionel Ming-shuan Ni (Chinese: 倪明选; born December 13, 1951) is serving as President of the Hong Kong University of Science and Technology (Guangzhou). His previous position was provost of the Hong Kong University of Science and Technology and concurrently the Chair Professor of Computer Science and Engineering. Prior that, he was the vice rector (academic affairs) at the University of Macau (UM) from January 2015 to 2019. Before joining UM, he was also the Chair Professor in the Computer Science and Engineering Department at the Hong Kong University of Science and Technology (HKUST), where he now returns to.

Before going to HKUST in 2002, he had spent more than 2 decades since 1981 as a full Professor in computer science and engineering at Michigan State University after he obtained his Ph.D. degree in 1980. During his stay, he served as the program director of the United States National Science Foundation Microelectronic Systems Architecture Program, directed 54 Ph.D. students and published numerous papers in pervasive computing, mobile computing, big data, sensor networks, parallel architectures, etc. He was elevated to the rank of a Fellow of the Institute of Electrical and Electronics Engineers in 1994 for his contribution to parallel processing and distributed systems. He owned 8 patents whilst more than 18 pending. His research papers were cited for more than 32000 times as of January 2019.
