= Guo Yike =

Chinese computer scientist

- 郭毅可
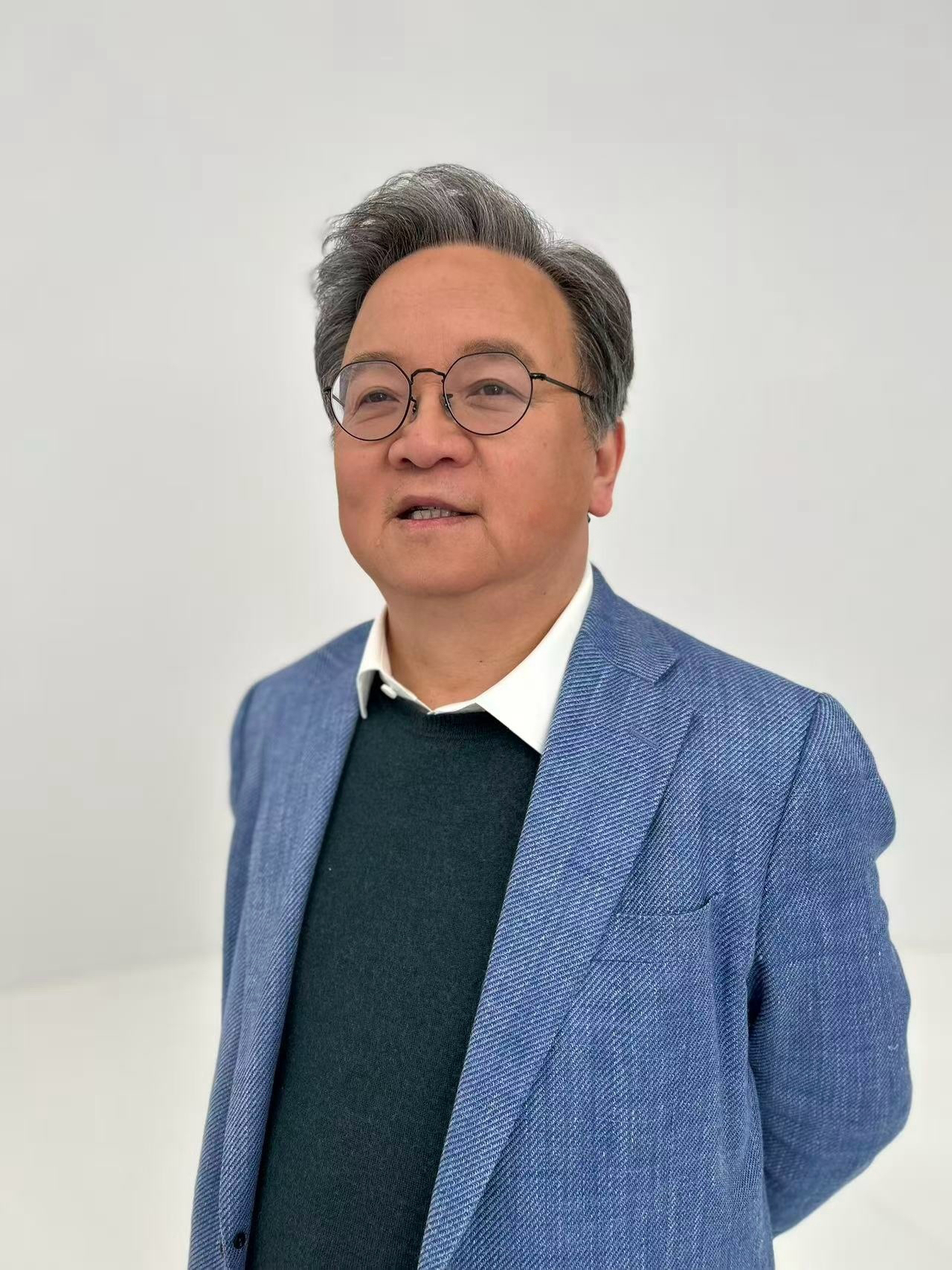
- Guo in 2026

Provost of Hong Kong University of Science and Technology
- Incumbent
- Assumed office 1 December 2022
- President: Nancy Ip
- Chancellor: John Lee Ka-chiu
- Preceded by: Lionel Ni

Personal details
- Born: 1962 (age 63–64) Shanghai, China
- Scientific career
- Education: Tsinghua University (Bachelor's degree); Imperial College London (PhD)
- Fields: Computer Science and Engineering
- Institutions: Hong Kong University of Science and Technology; Imperial College London; Hong Kong Baptist University; Shanghai University
- Thesis: Definitional constraint programming (1994)
- Doctoral advisor: John Darlington

Guo Yike (Chinese: 郭毅可; pinyin: Guō Yìkě) is a Chinese computer scientist who currently serves as provost of Hong Kong University of Science and Technology (HKUST) since 1 December 2022. He is concurrently a chair professor in the Department of Computer Science and Engineering of HKUST. Prior to joining HKUST he has been a full professor in the Department of Computing of Imperial College London (Imperial College). During his time there, he founded the Data Science Institute in April 2014.

Guo focuses on the fields of data mining, machine learning and artificial intelligence (AI).

== Early life and education ==
Guo was born in 1962 in Shanghai. Three generations of his family are affiliated with Tsinghua University.

In 1978 when Guo graduated from middle school, Deng Xiaoping resumed university education system that was interrupted by the Cultural Revolution which gave Guo the chance to attend university. Deng has special significance to Guo.

Guo attended Tsinghua University where he graduated with a bachelor's degree in computer science in 1985. As one of first PhD students at Tsinghua University following the Cultural Revolution, Guo initially signed up for a one-year AI training programme at Imperial College London since at the time the research environment in China was primitive. Eventually he enrolled in a full PhD programme and in 1994 received his PhD degree in computational logic under the supervision of John Darlington.

== Academic career ==
In 1997, Guo was employed as a lecturer in the Department of Computing of Imperial College London and became a professor in 2002. He held the position until 2022. In April 2014, Guo founded the Data Science Institute.

From 2014 to 2020, Guo served as Non-Executive Dean of the School of Computer Engineering and Science at Shanghai University.

On 1 January 2020, Guo joined Hong Kong Baptist University as vice-president of Research and Development and Dean of Graduate School.

In late 2022, Guo left Imperial College to become provost of HKUST.

== Other ventures ==
In 1998, Guo founded InforSense, an Imperial College Spin-out company. The company developed and rolled out core technology for big data processing in the pharmaceutical industry. It was sold in 2009.

Guo currently serves as the director of Hong Kong Generative AI Research and Development Centre which has released HKChat.

== Controversies ==
In late 2023, a BBC Channel 4 documentary, "Secrets and Power: China in the UK" investigated Chinese state interference with UK institutions and repression of dissidents on UK soil.

It reported Guo wrote eight papers with collaborators from Shanghai University on developing ways to use AI to control fleets of drone ships. In 2019, Imperial College signed a £3m research deal with JARI (Jiangsu Automation Research Institute), a Chinese research institute with links to the Chinese military. The goals were to advance maritime forecasting, computer vision and intelligent manufacturing "for civilian applications" although military end-uses were also in consideration. The research deal was terminated in 2021 and Imperial College said that it returned the funding associated with the partnership. Guo said his papers were "basic" and "written to help expand our existing base of scientific or technological knowledge rather than immediately solve specific real-world problems". He added: “The papers include viewpoints that can benefit societies worldwide.”

== Affiliations ==
Per:

- Fellow of Royal Academy of Engineering
- Fellow of the Institute of Electrical and Electronics Engineers
- Fellow of British Computer Society
- Fellow of Hong Kong Academy of Engineering Sciences
- Fellow of Chinese Association for Artificial Intelligence
- Member of Academia Europaea

== Honours and awards ==
Per:

- 2017 Regius Professor in Computer Science (offered)
- 2017 ACM SIGMM: Best Open Source Software Award
- 2016 China Internet Network Information Center: Top 10 Data Scientists in China
- 2014 Bio-IT World: Best Practice Award
- 2005 Bio-IT World: Best of the Show Award
- 2002 ACM/IEEE Supercomputing Conference: Most Innovative Award
- 1998 ACM/IEEE Supercomputing Conference: Terabyte Challenge Award
