= Wei Zhao =

Wei Zhao and Zhao Wei may refer to:

== People surnamed Wei ==
- Wei Zhao (Eastern Wu) (韋昭; 204–273), Chinese scholar during the Three Kingdoms period
- Wei Zhao (footballer) (魏釗; born 1983), Hong Kong football goalkeeper

== People surnamed Zhao ==
- Zhao Wei (赵薇; born 1976), Chinese actress, singer and director
- Zhao Wei (basketball) (赵薇; born 1963), Chinese Olympic basketball player
- Zhao Wei (hammer thrower) (趙巍; born 1979), female Chinese hammer thrower
- Zhao Wei (footballer) (赵伟; born 1989), Chinese footballer
- Zhao Wei (legal assistant) (趙威; born 1991), Chinese human rights activist
- Wei Zhao (computer scientist), (赵伟) Chinese-American computer scientist
- Zhao Wei (gangster) (赵伟; born 1952) Chinese gangster and the founder of Hong Kong-registered company Kings Romans Group
