= Simon S. M. Ho =

Simon S M Ho
- 何順文

President of Hang Seng University of Hong Kong Hang Seng Management College (2014 – 2018)
- Incumbent
- Assumed office 16 March 2014
- Chairman: Diana Cesar (2021 - present), Louisa Cheang Wai-wan (2018 to 2021), Rose Lee Wai-mun (2013 to 2018)

Vice Rector (Academic Affairs) of the University of Macau
- In office 16 March 2009 – 15 March 2014
- Rector: Wei Zhao (2008-2017)
- Preceded by: Position established (Note: Before the change of UM charter in 2008, there were two Vice Rectors but none of their official title included the field of management at the rear. The recruitment work of the post started in 2008 whereas there had been a vacancy of Vice Rector since Huang Yajun's resignation in 2006.)
- Succeeded by: Lionel Ni

Personal details
- Born: Hong Kong
- Education: University of Washington London School of Economics, University of Bradford

Professor Simon Ho Shun-man is the former President of Hang Seng University of Hong Kong. Under his presidency, Hang Seng Management College gained university title as The Hang Seng University of Hong Kong on 30 October 2018, becoming the second private university in Hong Kong.

Ho was born in Hong Kong. He attended Buddhist Tai Hung College for his secondary school education. He obtained a BA degree (Management and Psychology) from the University of Washington (USA) in 1979. After two years, he obtained a MSc degree (with Distinction) in Information Systems from the London School of Economics (UK). He obtained a PhD degree in Accounting and Finance from the University of Bradford (UK) in 1988. He holds a Certificate in Higher Education Management and Leadership from the University of California, Berkeley (USA). He was a Commonwealth Scholar and is a certified public accountant in the UK, Australia and Canada.

== Career ==
In 1982 Ho joined CUHK. Between 1995 and 2002 he was director of the School of Accountancy, CUHK. In 1996 Ho initiated the “Dragon League”, an academic alliance among the 4 accounting schools of CUHK, Peking University, Fudan University and National Taiwan University.

In 1998 he co-founded the Master in Professional Accountancy Programme jointly organized by CUHK and the Shanghai National Institute of Accounting.

Between 2004 and 2009 he was dean of the School of Business and founding director of the Centre for Corporate Governance and Financial Policy (CCGFP), HKBU

2009-2014 Vice Rector (Academic Affairs) of the University of Macau. Prof. Ho played an important role in the many changes at UM, including the undergraduate curriculum reforms, the launch of the new general education programme, and the establishment of the first Honorary College in the region and Asia’s largest residential college system.

16 March 2014, he assumed the presidency of Hang Seng Management College.

He was the first Chinese awarded the Faculty Pioneer Award by the Aspen Institute, USA in 2008. He was elected as one of the 100 Most Influential People in Business Ethics 2008 by Ethisphere.

== Public service ==
- Member of Deposit Protection Appeals Tribunal (2005-2011)
- Member of Securities and Futures Appeals Tribunal (2007-2011)
- Member, Advisory Group on Directors and Officers Related Provisions ("AG3")(2006-2009)
- Advisor, Dashun Foundation (2015-)
- Advisor, Our Hong Kong Foundation (2018-)
