= Hsiao-Wuen Hon =

Taiwanese-American speech technology researcher

- 洪小文
- Born: May 31, 1963 (age 63)
- Education: National Taiwan University (BS); Carnegie Mellon University (PhD)
- Scientific career
- Fields: Computer science
- Thesis: Vocabulary-independent speech recognition: the Vocind System (1992)
- Doctoral advisor: Raj Reddy

Hsiao-Wuen Hon (Chinese: 洪小文; born: May 31, 1963) is a Taiwanese-American computer scientist and researcher in speech technology, and coauthor of the book Spoken Language Processing. He is Corporate Vice President of Microsoft and Chairman of Microsoft's Asia-Pacific R&D Group.

== Life ==
Hon is a U.S. citizen born in Taiwan. Hon represented Taiwan in the International Mathematics Olympiad in high school. He received his bachelor's degree in electrical engineering from National Taiwan University in 1985. In 1986, he entered Carnegie Mellon University to study under professor Raj Reddy and earned a Ph.D. in computer science.

== Career ==
After earning his PhD in 1992, Hon joined Apple, where he led research and development for the company's Chinese Dictation Kit. In 1995, he joined Microsoft as a senior researcher in their SAPI and speech engine technologies.

Hon was involved in the creation of Microsoft Research Asia in Beijing, the firm's first R&D operation in China. He was transferred to Microsoft's Seattle headquarters in 1998, promoted to Microsoft Voice Products Chief Technology Architect, then returned to Beijing in 2004 as Deputy Managing Director of Microsoft Research Asia. Hon founded and managed Microsoft Search Technology Center from 2005 to 2007 and led development of Microsoft's Bing search product in Asia-Pacific. He was named managing director in 2007. In 2014, Hon was appointed Chairman of Microsoft Asia-Pacific R&D Group and in October 2015, he became Senior Vice President of Microsoft Corporation.

Hon has served on the Ambarella board of directors since 2017. He is a faculty member of the Schwarzman Scholars program and an adjunct professor with the Chinese University of Hong Kong's Department of Systems Engineering and Engineering Management.

== Selected publications ==
- Song, Ruihua; Guo, Qingwei; Zhang, Ruochi; Xin, Guomao; Wen, Ji-Rong; Yu, Yong; Hon, Hsiao-Wuen (January 2011). "Select-the-Best-Ones: A new way to judge relative relevance". Information Processing & Management. 47 (1): 37–52. doi:10.1016/j.ipm.2010.02.005.
- Song, Ruihua; Luo, Zhenxiao; Nie, Jian-Yun; Yu, Yong; Hon, Hsiao-Wuen (March 2009). "Identification of ambiguous queries in web search". Information Processing & Management. 45 (2): 216–229. doi:10.1016/j.ipm.2008.09.005.
- Erol, Berna; Luo, Jiebo; Chang, Shih-Fu; Etoh, Minoru; Hon, Hsiao-Wuen; Lin, Qian; Setlur, Vidya (2009). "Mobile media search: Has media search finally found its perfect platform? Part II". Proceedings of the 17th ACM international conference on Multimedia. pp. 911–912. doi:10.1145/1631272.1631447. ISBN 978-1-60558-608-3.
- Erol, Berna; Cohen, Jordan; Etoh, Minoru; Hon, Hsiao-Wuen; Luo, Jiebo; Schalkwyk, Johan (2009). "Mobile media search". 2009 IEEE International Conference on Acoustics, Speech and Signal Processing. pp. 4897–4900. doi:10.1109/ICASSP.2009.4960729. ISBN 978-1-4244-2353-8.
- Cao, Yunbo; Duan, Huizhong; Lin, Chin-Yew; Yu, Yong; Hon, Hsiao-Wuen (2008). "Recommending questions using the MDL-based tree cut model". Proceedings of the 17th international conference on World Wide Web. pp. 81–90. doi:10.1145/1367497.1367509. ISBN 978-1-60558-085-2.
- Song, Ruihua; Taylor, Michael J.; Wen, Ji-Rong; Hon, Hsiao-Wuen; Yu, Yong (2008). "Viewing Term Proximity from a Different Perspective". Advances in Information Retrieval. Lecture Notes in Computer Science. Vol. 4956. pp. 346–357. doi:10.1007/978-3-540-78646-7_32. ISBN 978-3-540-78645-0.
- Gao, Wei; Niu, Cheng; Nie, Jian-Yun; Zhou, Ming; Hu, Jian; Wong, Kam-Fai; Hon, Hsiao-Wuen (2007). "Cross-lingual query suggestion using query logs of different languages". Proceedings of the 30th annual international ACM SIGIR conference on Research and development in information retrieval. pp. 463–470. doi:10.1145/1277741.1277821. ISBN 978-1-59593-597-7.
- Song, Ruihua; Luo, Zhenxiao; Wen, Ji-Rong; Yu, Yong; Hon, Hsiao-Wuen (2007). "Identifying ambiguous queries in web search". Proceedings of the 16th international conference on World Wide Web. pp. 1169–1170. doi:10.1145/1242572.1242749. ISBN 978-1-59593-654-7.
- Cao, Yunbo; Xu, Jun; Liu, Tie-Yan; Li, Hang; Huang, Yalou; Hon, Hsiao-Wuen (2006). "Adapting ranking SVM to document retrieval". Proceedings of the 29th annual international ACM SIGIR conference on Research and development in information retrieval. pp. 186–193. doi:10.1145/1148170.1148205. ISBN 1-59593-369-7.

== Awards and honors ==
- He is an IEEE fellow and Microsoft Distinguished Scientist
- He was granted the Great Wall Friendship Award by the Beijing Municipal Government

== See also ==
- Zhang Hongjiang
- Qiang Yang
- Hui Xiong
- Yong Rui
- Harry Shum
- Ya-Qin Zhang
- Xing Xie
