= Ya-Qin Zhang =

Chinese scientist (born 1966)

- 张亚勤
- Born: 1966 (age 59–60)
- Education: University of Science and Technology of China (BS, MS); George Washington University (PhD)
- Known for: Digital Video, AI/Machine learning, Autonomous Driving, Cloud computing
- Children: Jenny Wang (Wife) and Sophie Zhang(Daughter) and Brandon Zhang(Son)
- Awards: Academician, Chinese Academy of Engineering (CAE) 中国工程院 院士 Fellow, American Academy of Arts and Science (AAA&S) 美国艺术与科学院 院士 Fellow, National Academy of Inventors (NAI) 国家发明院 院士 Foreign Fellow, Australia Academy of Engineering (ATSE) 澳洲工程院 院士 Fellow of IEEE/AAA&S/CAAI/APAI/FTSE IEEE Industry Pioneer Award, 2004 IEEE Golden Jubilee Medal, 1999 by IEEE Circuits and Systems Society
- Scientific career
- Workplaces: Former President, Baidu Inc. Corp Vice President of Microsoft, and Managing Director of MSRA Chair Professor and Dean of AIR, Tsinghua University

Ya-Qin Zhang (simplified Chinese: 张亚勤; traditional Chinese: 張亞勤; pinyin: Zhāng Yàqín; born in 1966) is a Chinese-American scientist, technologist and business executive. He is currently a Chair Professor at Tsinghua University and the founding Dean of the Tsinghua institute for AI Industry Research (AIR).

Zhang was President of Baidu Inc. (NASDAQ:BIDU) from September 2014 to October 2019. He was previously a key executive of Microsoft for 16 years, including Corporate Vice President for mobile and embedded Products in Redmond, Washington, managing director of Microsoft Research Asia, and Chairman of Microsoft China.

== Early life and education ==
Zhang was born in Taiyuan, Shanxi, in 1966, and is married with two children.

At age 12, Zhang was admitted to the University of Science and Technology of China, then the youngest college student in the country. He earned a PhD in Electrical Engineering from George Washington University, had executive trainings at Harvard University, and was awarded an honorary Doctorate from Univ. of Surrey.

== Career ==
=== Microsoft Corporation ===
He was a co-founder of Microsoft Research China in 1999 as the inaugural Chief Scientist, and then became the managing director in 2000 after its founding director Kai-Fu Lee's promotion and relocation to Microsoft HQ. It was under Zhang's leadership that Microsoft Research China was elevated to Microsoft Research Asia in 2002, which has become a premier computer science research center in the world. He was the founding Chairman of Microsoft Asia R&D Group (ARD), the largest R&D center for Microsoft outside of US, with over 5000 scientists and engineers.

In 2011, Zhang founded the Microsoft venture Accelerator in Beijing, and has become one of the most vibrant start-up engines in China with over 200 companies incubated over the years.

=== Baidu ===
Zhang joined Baidu as president of the company in 2014 and retired in October 2019. As President, Zhang worked closely with founder Robin Li in pivoting the company to new technology and business arena, including intelligent cloud, autonomous driving, silicon technology, industrial AI, and new emerging business.

=== Tsinghua University ===
Zhang joined Tsinghua University as the Chair Professor of AI Science, with a joint appointment from the School of Computer Science and School of Vehicle and Mobility. He is the founding Dean of the Institute for AI Industry Research (AIR), focusing on scientific research and technological innovation for the fourth industry revolution, such as autonomous driving, AI+green computing, and AI+life science.

== Awards, appointments and fellowships ==
He is elected to Chinese Academy of Sciences, American Academy of Arts and Sciences, National Academy of Inventors, and Australia National Academy of Engineering (ATSE) . He became an IEEE Fellow in 1997 for contribution to and leadership in the development of digital video compression and communications technology, standards, and products, at the age of 31, making him the youngest scientist winning this honor in the 100+ year history of the organization. He received the industry pioneer award from IEEE for his seminal contributions and technical leadership in digital video and communications in 2004. Upon his winning of "Outstanding Young Electrical Engineer Award" in 1998, Zhang received a congratulation letter from then US president Bill Clinton, praising him as "an inspiration for others".

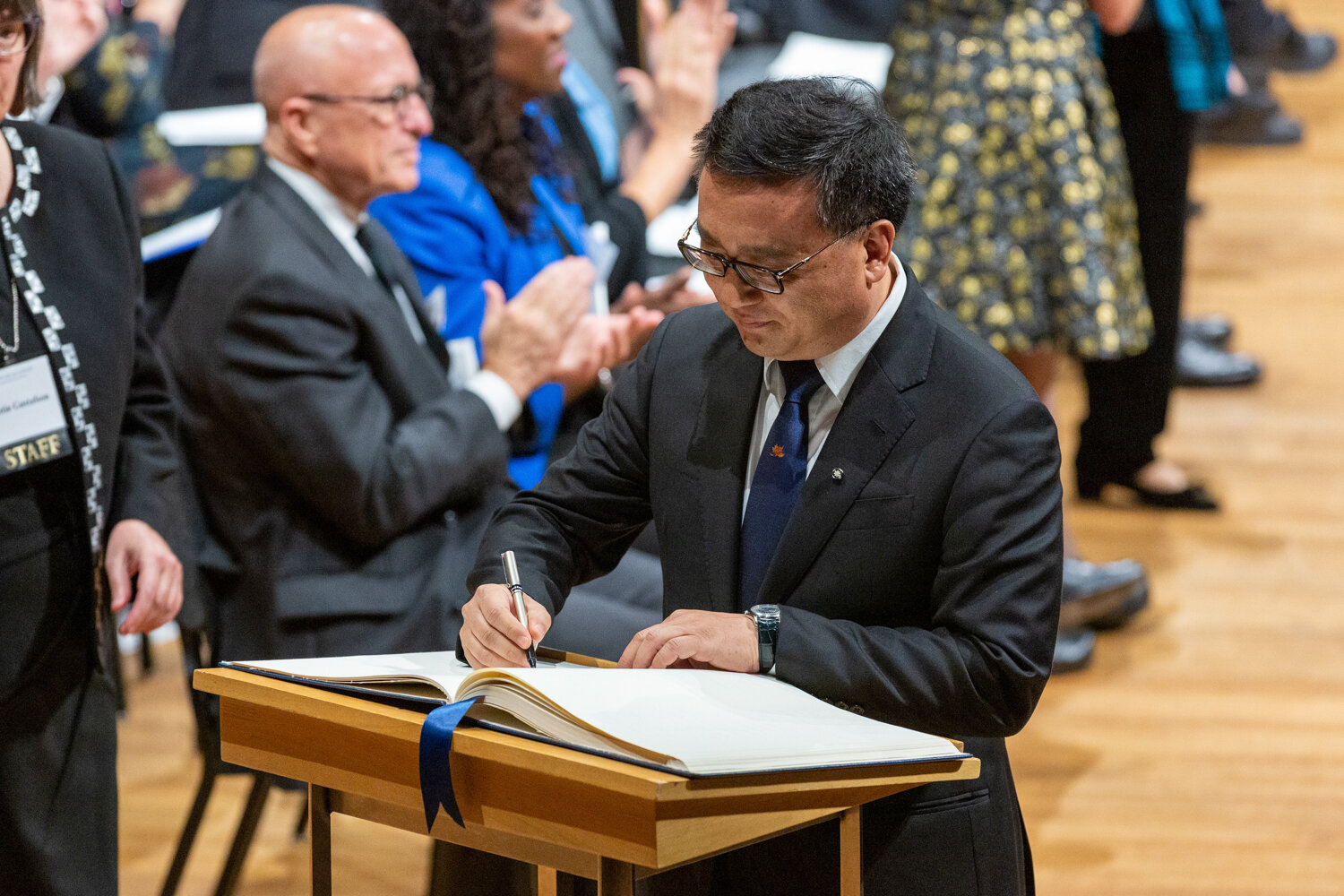
Zhang at The Academy induction ceremony (2019)

Zhang currently serves on the Board of Directors of three public companies, and holds board membership and adjunct professorship in five prestigious universities. He was named one of the top 10 CEOs in Asia, 50 global shapers, Executive of the year, IT innovator leader award by IT Times, Business Week, CNBC, Global business and Vision magazine. One of the prominent figures in artificial intelligence and autonoumous driving, Zhang serves on the board of stewardship for the future of mobility of the Davos World Economic Forum, and is the Chairman of the Apollo Alliance, the largest open platform for autonomous driving in the world. Zhang is a founding member of UNDP (United Nations Development Program) Private Sector.

- Chinese Academy of Engineering, 2021
- American Academy of Arts and Sciences, 2019
- National Academy of Inventors, 2021
- Australia Academy of Technology and Engineering (ATSE), 2017
- Fellow of IEEE/CAAI/AAAS/APAI/ATSE
- Member, Private Sector Board, United Nation Development Program (UNDP), 2016
- Intl Advisory board, Cornell University, 2015
- International Advisory Board, National IT Center of Australia, Sydney, Australia, 2008–2011
- Engineer of the Year, Asia Engineering Society, 2007
- Best paper awards, IEEE (Trans. Multimedia, Trans. Video Tech, JSAC), 2000, 2003, 2004, 2007
- Industrial Pioneer Award, IEEE, 2004
- Advisor to National Science Foundation, China (2001–2004)

== Misc ==
Zhang is a member of the Committee of 100, a group of leading Chinese-Americans to promote the cultural, scientific, social, and economic exchanges between the US and China.

Zhang serves on the Strategic Committee of the France China Foundation. The France China Foundation encourages the development of relationship between French and Chinese leaders, to stimulate their interest in the other country and to inspire them to set up joint projects.

== See also ==
- Zhang Hongjiang
- Qiang Yang
- Hui Xiong
- Yong Rui
- Harry Shum
- Hsiao-Wuen Hon
- Xing Xie
