= Zhang Hongjiang =

Chinese computer scientist and executive

Zhang Hongjiang (simplified Chinese: 张宏江; traditional Chinese: 張宏江; pinyin: Zhāng Hóngjiāng) is a Chinese computer scientist and executive. He was CEO of Kingsoft, managing director of Microsoft Advanced Technology Center (ATC) and chief technology officer (CTO) of Microsoft China Research and Development Group (CRD). Hongjiang is founder of BAAI. In 2022, he was elected to the National Academy of Engineering for his technical contributions and leadership in the area of multimedia computing.

== Background ==
Zhang retired in December 2016 from the positions of CEO of Kingsoft, the executive director of Kingsoft board, and the CEO of Kingsoft Cloud. He is a senior advisor of Carlye Group (NASDAQ: CG). He was also the board member of Cheetah Mobile Inc. (NYSE: CMCM), Xunlei Limited (NASDAQ: XNET), and 21Vianet Group, Inc. (NASDAQ: VNET).

Zhang was a founding member, then the assistant managing director, of Microsoft Research Asia (MSRA). MSRA was reported in 2004 as "The hottest Computer Lab" by MIT Technology Review. While with MSRA, he led efforts to research in Media Computing, Data Mining and Web Search, Natural Language Computing, and Distributed Systems. Prior to joining Microsoft, Zhang was with Hewlett-Packard Labs at Palo Alto, California, where he was a research manager. He also worked at the Institute of Systems Science (today, renamed I2R), National University of Singapore.

A researcher in media computing, more specifically in video and image analysis, search and browsing, over the years, Zhang has authored four books, over 350 scientific papers, and holds 62 US patents. He has been elected Fellow of IEEE for contributions to media computing and leadership in content-based visual media analysis, retrieval, and browsing, and Association for Computing Machinery (ACM) and won the "2008 Asian American Engineers of the Year" award. He is also the recipient of 2010 IEEE Computer Society Technical Achievement Awards and the recipient of 2010 Microsoft Distinguished Scientist.

Zhang was chief technology officer (CTO) for Microsoft China Research and Development Group (CRD) and managing director of the Microsoft Advanced Technology Center (ATC). In 2011, Zhang left Microsoft and joined Kingsoft as CEO.

== Education ==
- PhD in electrical engineering, Technical University of Denmark, Lyngby, Denmark, 1991
- BS in radio and electronics, Zhengzhou University, Henan, China, 1982

== Academic activities & Awards ==
- Asian Scientist 100, Asian Scientist, 2023
- International member of National Academy of Engineering (NAE) - USA, 2022
- Edward J. McCluskey Technical Achievement Award, IEEE, 2010
- Fellow, Institute of Electric and Electronic Engineers (IEEE)
- Fellow, Association for Computing Machinery (ACM), 2007
- Co-chair, IEEE Multimedia Conference and Expo, Toronto, July 2006
- Chair, ACM Multimedia Conference, Singapore, Oct, 2005
- Editor, Proceedings of IEEE, 2004-
- Editor in chief of IEEE Transaction on Multimedia, 2004–2007
- ACM SIGMM executive board, 2002–2004
- Associate editor, IEEE Transaction on Circuits and Systems for Video Technology, 1999–2002
- Member of editorial board, IEEE Multimedia, 1998–2002
- Editor, Journal of Visual Communication and Image Representation, 1997–2002
- Founding member of editorial board, International Journal of Multimedia Tools and Application, 1995–1999

== See also ==
- Qiang Yang
- Hui Xiong
- Yong Rui
- Harry Shum
- Hsiao-Wuen Hon
- Ya-Qin Zhang
- Xing Xie
