= Thomas J. Palmeri =

Psychologist

Thomas Palmeri is a professor of psychology at Vanderbilt University. He serves as Chair of the Psychology department. He is co-director of the Data Science Institute at the university’s Department of Psychology. He heads the Category Laboratory (CatLab) there.

== Recognition ==
- American Psychological Association Division of Experimental Psychology New Investigator Award, 1998.
- Elected Fellow of the Psychonomic Society in 1998.
- Chancellor’s Award for Research at Vanderbilt University in 2009
- Elected Fellow of the Association for Psychological Science in 2015
- Distinguished Professor at Vanderbilt, 2019

== Research ==
The CatLab investigates visual cognition, including visual categorization, visual memory, and visual decision making. The lab studies how objects are perceived and represented by the visual system, how visual knowledge is represented and learned, and how visual decisions are made. These questions are addressed using behavioral experiments, cognitive neuroscience techniques, and computational and neural modeling.

Palmeri's contributions link experience, expertise, perception, and decision-making. He showed that the development of expertise often involves a transition from rule-based to instance-based reasoning. In other work, he found that experience with new categories can influence perceptual abilities. He studied how naming objects affects their visual memory, testing prior claims that had been made but that were inconsistent with existing memory models.

In collaboration with Gordon Logan and Jeffrey Schall, he developed neural models to account for decision-making performance in quick response tasks and led to several publications, including in Psychological Review.
