= Xing Xie =

Computer scientist at Microsoft Research Asia

- 谢幸
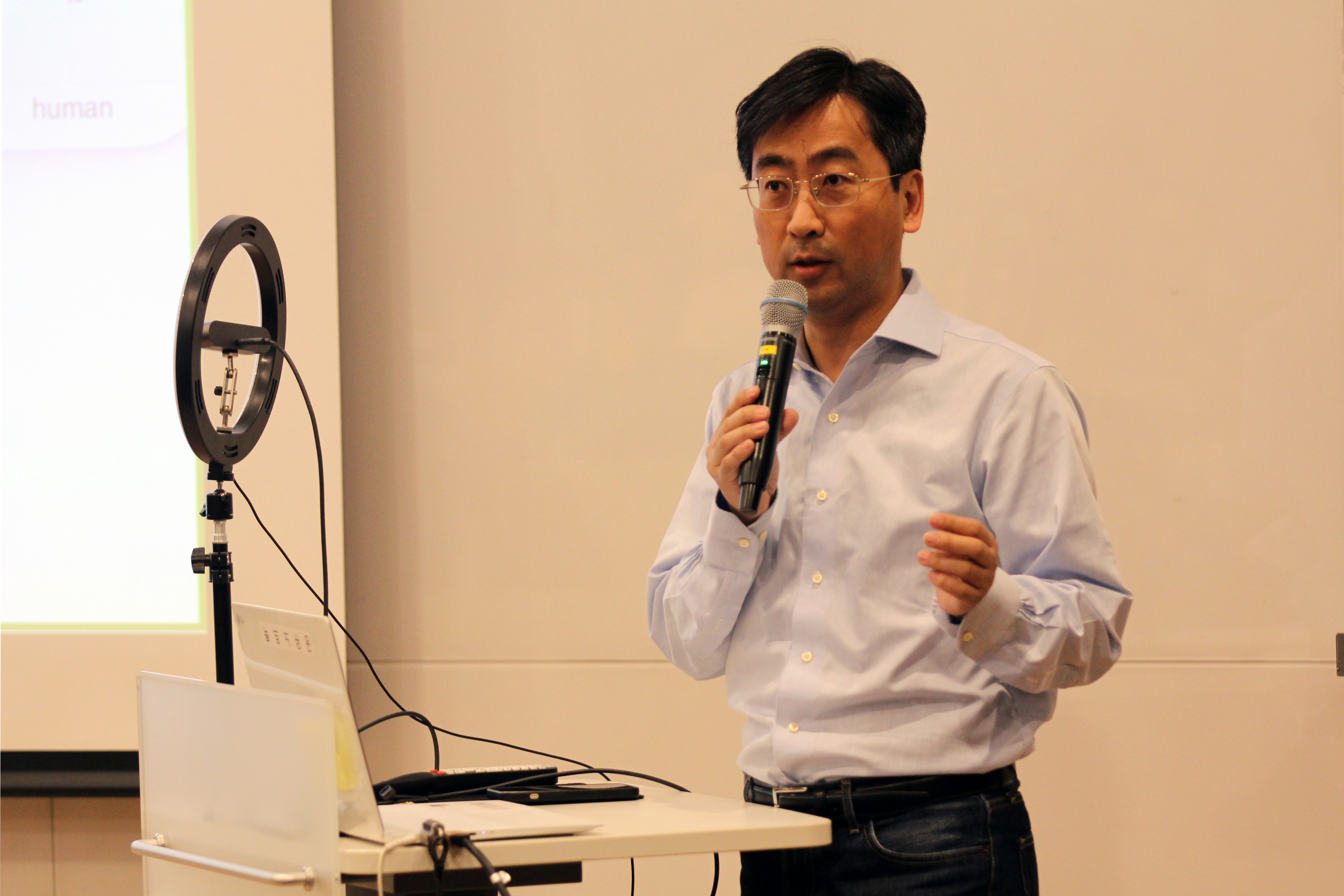
- Born: Nanchang, Jiangxi, China
- Education: Ph.D.
- Alma mater: University of Science and Technology of China
- Awards: 2022: Test of Time Award, ACM SIGKDD; 2019: 10-Year Impact Award, ACM SIGSPATIAL; 1999: Microsoft Fellowship
- Scientific career
- Fields: Data mining, social computing, responsible AI, recommender systems, ubiquitous computing
- Institutions: Microsoft Research Asia
- Thesis: Optimization strategies of randomized algorithms for NP-Hard problems (2001)
- Doctoral advisor: Guoliang Chen (zh)

Chinese name
- Traditional Chinese: 謝幸
- Simplified Chinese: 谢幸
Transcriptions
- Website: Microsoft researcher profile

Xing Xie (Chinese: 谢幸) is a partner research manager at Microsoft Research Asia. As a computer scientist, his research has focused on data mining, social computing, and responsible AI. He has published more than 400 papers which have been cited more than 60,000 times. He has been on organizing committees or helped with the programs of over 70 conferences and workshops.

Xie is a recipient of a number of awards, including the IEEE MDM 2023 Test-of-Time Award, ACM SIGKDD 2022 Test-of-Time Award, ACM SIGKDD China 2021 Test-of-Time Award, ACM SIGSPATIAL 2020 10-Year Impact Award Honorable Mention, and ACM SIGSPATIAL 2019 10-Year Impact Award. Some of his keynote speeches include MDM 2019, ASONAM 2017, and W2GIS 2011. He has been named a DeepTech Pioneer in China's Intelligent Computing Technology Innovation and is a fellow of the ACM, IEEE, and China Computer Federation.

== Education ==
Xie went through Nanchang No.10 Middle School in Jiangxi Province, China. In 1992, he enrolled in the University of Science and Technology of China for both his B.S. and Ph.D. He graduated from the Department of Computer Science in 2001.

== Career ==
In July 2001, Xie started as an associate researcher at Microsoft Research Asia in Beijing, China where he held a number of research roles including senior principal researcher.

Around 2009, his group was interested in data mining to learn user interests and therefore recommend travel route, restaurants, and social connections. As smartphones and other data creating devices became more common, the impact grew accordingly and later created the foundation for research into responsible AI practices. This interdisciplinary research led to them becoming pioneers in this field.

In 2022, large language models made impressive progress, changing the landscape of many areas and bringing significant impact to society. Microsoft Research responded by naming Xie to lead their Societal AI initiative to remove bias, instill fairness, and detoxify language, among other goals to ensure AI is encountable to society as the technological tool evolves into more of a society entity that that exerts significant influence.

== Editorial activities ==
Xie has served on various editorial boards including ACM Transactions on Recommender Systems, ACM Transactions on Social Computing, ACM Transactions on Intelligent Systems and Technology, and CCF Transactions on Pervasive Computing and Interaction, among others.

== Awards ==
- 2023: Natural Science Award - Fundamental Theories and Methods of Data Mining for Recommendation Systems, China Computer Federation
- 2023: MDM Test of Time Award, IEEE
- 2023: Intelligent Computing Innovators China, DeepTech
- 2022: Outstanding Paper, NeurIPS 2022
- 2022: Test of Time Award, ACM SIGKDD
- 2021: Test of Time Award, ACM SIGKDD China
- 2020: 10-Year Impact Award Honorable Mention, ACM SIGSPATIAL
- 2019: Distinguished Speaker, China Computer Federation
- 2019: 10-Year Impact Award, ACM SIGSPATIAL
- 2019: Green Bamboo Award, China Computer Federation
- 2016: Best student paper in applied data, Science Track, KDD
- 2014: Microsoft Achievement Award
- 2013: ICDM Best Paper Award
- 2013: Distinguished Speaker, China Computer Federation
- 2010: Best Paper Award, UIC
- 2010: Best Paper Runner-Up Award, ACM SIGSPATIAL
- 1999: Microsoft Fellowship

== Memberships ==
Xie is a fellow of the ACM, IEEE, and China Computer Federation. He has also been a steering committee member of the Pervasive and Ubiquitous Computing Conference Series AC member of China Computer Federation Young Computer Scientists & Engineers Forum (YOCSEF), and held positions at ACM SIGSPATIAL China and Pervasive Computing Technical Committee of the China Computer Federation.

== Selected publications ==
- Jing Yuan; Yu Zheng; Xing Xie (12 August 2012). "Discovering regions of different functions in a city using human mobility and POIs". Proceedings of the 18th ACM SIGKDD international conference on Knowledge discovery and data mining. Association for Computing Machinery. pp. 186–194. doi:10.1145/2339530.2339561. ISBN 978-1-4503-1462-6.
- Jing Yuan; Yu Zheng; Chengyang Zhang; Wenlei Xie; Xing Xie; Guangzhong Sun; Yan Huang (2 November 2010). "T-drive: Driving directions based on taxi trajectories". Proceedings of the 18th SIGSPATIAL International Conference on Advances in Geographic Information Systems. Association for Computing Machinery. pp. 99–108. doi:10.1145/1869790.1869807. ISBN 978-1-4503-0428-3.
- Yin Lou; Chengyang Zhang; Yu Zheng; Xing Xie; Wei Wang; Yan Huang (November 2009). "Map-matching for low-sampling-rate GPS trajectories". Proceedings of the 17th ACM SIGSPATIAL International Conference on Advances in Geographic Information Systems. Association for Computing Machinery. pp. 352–361. doi:10.1145/1653771.1653820. ISBN 978-1-60558-649-6.
- Jing Yuan; Yu Zheng; Xing Xie; Guangzhong Sun (August 2011). "Driving with knowledge from the physical world". Proceedings of the 17th ACM SIGKDD international conference on Knowledge discovery and data mining. Association for Computing Machinery. pp. 316–324. doi:10.1145/2020408.2020462. ISBN 978-1-4503-0813-7.
- Jing Yuan; Yu Zheng; Chengyang Zhang; Xing Xie; Guang-Zhong Sun (May 2010). "An Interactive-Voting Based Map Matching Algorithm". 2010 Eleventh International Conference on Mobile Data Management. IEEE Computer Society. pp. 43–52. doi:10.1109/MDM.2010.14. ISBN 978-1-4244-7075-4.
- Yu Zheng; Lizhu Zhang; Xing Xie; Wei-Ying Ma (April 2009). "Mining interesting locations and travel sequences from GPS trajectories". Proceedings of the 18th international conference on World wide web. Association for Computing Machinery. pp. 791–800. doi:10.1145/1526709.1526816. ISBN 978-1-60558-487-4.
- Fuzheng Zhang; Nicholas Jing Yuan; Defu Lian; Xing Xie; Wei-Ying Ma (August 2016). "Collaborative Knowledge Base Embedding for Recommender Systems". Proceedings of the 22nd ACM SIGKDD International Conference on Knowledge Discovery and Data Mining. Association for Computing Machinery. pp. 353–362. doi:10.1145/2939672.2939673. ISBN 978-1-4503-4232-2.

== See also ==
- Zhang Hongjiang
- Qiang Yang
- Hui Xiong
- Yong Rui
- Harry Shum
- Hsiao-Wuen Hon
- Ya-Qin Zhang
- Cha Meeyoung
