= Yonghua Song =

Chinese electrical engineer

Song Yonghua
- Born: 1964 (age 61–62); China
- Education: Chengdu University of Science and Technology (now Sichuan University)
- Known for: Electrical power
- Awards: FREng (2004)
- Scientific career
- Fields: Electrical power
- Workplaces: University of Macau; Zhejiang University; Brunel University

Notes
- Rector, University of Macau

Yonghua Song
- Simplified Chinese: 宋永华
- Traditional Chinese: 宋永華
Transcriptions
Standard Mandarin
- Hanyu Pinyin: Sòng Yǒnghuá

Song Yonghua FREng (Chinese: 宋永华; born 1964) is a Chinese electrical engineer. He has been rector of the University of Macau since January 2018, and previously served as Executive Vice President at Zhejiang University.

== Education ==
Song was educated at Chengdu University of Science and Technology and received his M.S. and Ph. D degrees from the Electric Power Research Institute (EPRI) of China in 1987 and 1989.

== Career ==
From 1991 to 1992, Song was the Royal Society Visiting Fellow at the School of Mathematics, University of Bristol, UK and from 1992 to 1993, he was the research officer at the School of Electronic and Electrical Engineering and lecturer from 1993 to 1994 at the University of Bath, UK.

From 1997 to 2010, he was a Department of Electronic and Computer Engineering Professor, Brunel University, UK. He held the Royal Academy of Engineering/Nuclear Electric/Siemens Chair of Power Systems at Brunel from Jan 1997 to Dec 2001. In 2004, he was appointed the pro-vice-chancellor for graduate studies at Brunel.

He became the pro-vice chancellor at the University of Liverpool in 2007, holding concurrently the post of executive president at Xi’an Jiaotong – Liverpool University in Suzhou, China. He was also a Changjiang Scholar and chair professor of Xian Jiaotong University in 2001.

In 2009, he was an assistant president and professor of electrical engineering at Tsinghua University. He was appointed Director of the Chinese National Recruitment Program of Global Experts (1000 Talents Program) Office until December 2012. In November 2012, he joined Zhejiang University as executive vice president and the founding dean of the International Campus.

In January 2018, he was appointed Rector (President) of the University of Macau, succeeding Wei Zhao.

== Research ==
His research focuses on power system analysis, flexible alternating current transmission systems(FACTS) control, steady-state and transient state power system analysis, simulation and analysis of power systems.

== Awards ==
- Fellow, UK Royal Academy of Engineering (2004)
- Honorary Doctor of Engineering, University of Bath, UK
- Fellow, IEEE in 2008 for contributions to optimization techniques for power systems.
- Fellow, IET
