= Marianne Francois =

French-American fluid dynamics researcher

Marianne M. Francois is a French-American researcher in computational fluid dynamics at the Los Alamos National Laboratory in New Mexico. Her work includes the simulation of surface tension in fluids, heat transfer, and multiphase flow. She is division leader of the Theoretical Division at Los Alamos.

== Education and career ==
Francois earned an engineering diploma at the EPF School of Engineering in 1997. After a master's degree from Embry–Riddle Aeronautical University in 1998, she completed a Ph.D. in aerospace engineering at the University of Florida in 2002, advised there by Wei Shyy.

She joined Los Alamos in 2002, and began working there in the Continuum Dynamics Group. She became deputy group leader in the Fluid Dynamics and Solid Mechanics group in 2012, group leader of the Methods and Algorithms group in 2015, and program manager for Physics and Engineering Models in 2018. She was named as division leader in 2020.

== Recognition ==
The University of Florida's Department of Mechanical & Aerospace Engineering gave Francois its 2019-2020 Outstanding MAE Alumna Award, its highest honor for alumni.

She was named as an ASME Fellow in 2023.

== Personal life ==
Francois earned a license as a private pilot in France after finishing high school. She serves as a captain in the Civil Air Patrol, through which she has flown search-and-rescue missions and helps mentor teenage volunteers. She is also a member of the Rio Grande Norte chapter of the Ninety-Nines, and through the Ninety-Nines has led aviation-related workshops for teen girls to encourage them to work in STEM fields.
