= Qiang Yang =

Artificial-intelligence researcher

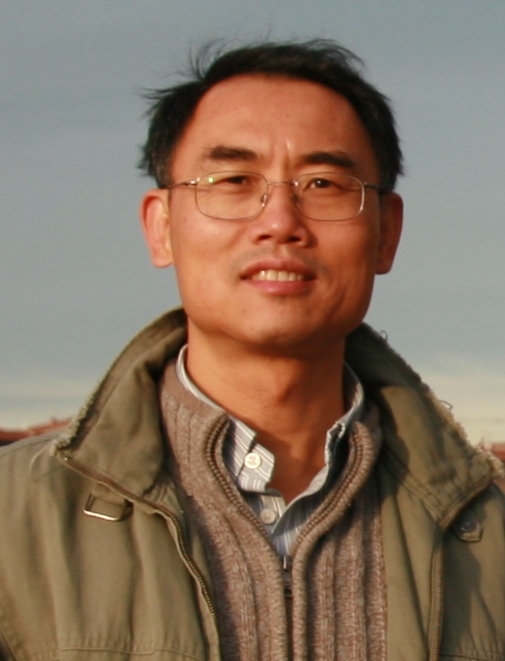
- Born: 12 December 1963 (age 62); Beijing, China
- Education: University of Maryland
- Scientific career
- Workplaces: HKUST
- Thesis: Improving the Efficiency of Planning (1989)
- Doctoral advisor: Dana S. Nau
- Website: www.cs.ust.hk/~qyang/

Qiang Yang (Chinese: 杨强; pinyin: yáng qiáng) (born 1963) is the Chair Professor, Department Head of CSE, HKUST in Hong Kong and University New Bright Professor of Engineering and Chair Professor from 2015. He was the founding head of Noah's Ark Lab. He had taught at the University of Waterloo and Simon Fraser University. His research interests are data mining and artificial intelligence.

== Biography ==
Qiang Yang was born in Beijing, China. He is the son of Haishou Yang (Chinese: 杨海寿), an astronomer in China.

Qiang Yang attended Tsinghua University High School in 1975 and then Peking University in 1978. He graduated from Peking University with a degree in astrophysics and went to the US through the CUSPEA exams in 1982. He obtained his master's degree in astrophysics from the University of Maryland in 1985, and another master's degree in computer science at the same university in 1987. He obtained his doctorate degree in computer science from the University of Maryland in 1989 (supervisor: Dana S. Nau).

Qiang Yang had taught at the University of Waterloo (1989–1995, Assistant Professor, Associate Professor) and Simon Fraser University (1995–2001, Associate Professor, Full Professor). He worked in Microsoft Research Asia from 1999 to 2000. He is now a professor of CSE at HKUST in Hong Kong.

== Awards ==
- Qiang Yang is an ACM Fellow (2017).
- He was elevated to AAAI Fellow in 2013.
- He was elevated to IEEE Fellow (2009).
- He was elevated to IAPR Fellow (2012–).
- He was elevated to AAAS Fellow (2012–).
- He was elected chairman of the International Joint Conference on Artificial Intelligence (IJCAI) (2017–).

== Career ==
He is the head of Noah's Ark Lab which was founded by Huawei and headquartered in Hong Kong in June 2012. He was invited to serve as the chief technology advisor of Weixin in 2015. He is also the founding Editor in Chief of the ACM Transactions on Intelligent Systems and Technology (ACM TIST) from 2010. He had been the vice chair of ACM SIGART between 2010 and 2013, a program co-chair for ACM SIGKDD 2010, and the general chair for ACM SIGKDD 2012. He had also been a general co-chair for ACM IUI (Intelligent User Interface) 2010 and ACM RecSys (Recommender System) Conference in 2013. He is a member of the IJCAI trustee between 2011 and 2017 and the program chair of IJCAI-15 held in Buenos Aires.

== Personal life ==
Yang is married to a Canadian woman from Calgary, together they have a son, Glen, a professional basketball player for Hong Kong Bulls and Hong Kong men's national basketball team.

== Books ==
- "Digital Watermarking for Machine Learning Model"
- "Crafting Your Research Future: A Guide to Successful Master's and PhD Degrees in Science & Engineering" (Chinese:《学术研究你的成功之道)
- "Intelligent Planning: A Decomposition and Abstraction Based Approach"
- "Constraint-Based Design Recovery for Software Reengineering: Theory and Experiments (International Series in Software Engineering)"

== See also ==
- Zhang Hongjiang
- Hui Xiong
- Yong Rui
- Harry Shum
- Hsiao-Wuen Hon
- Ya-Qin Zhang
- Xing Xie
