= Dana S. Nau =

American computer scientist

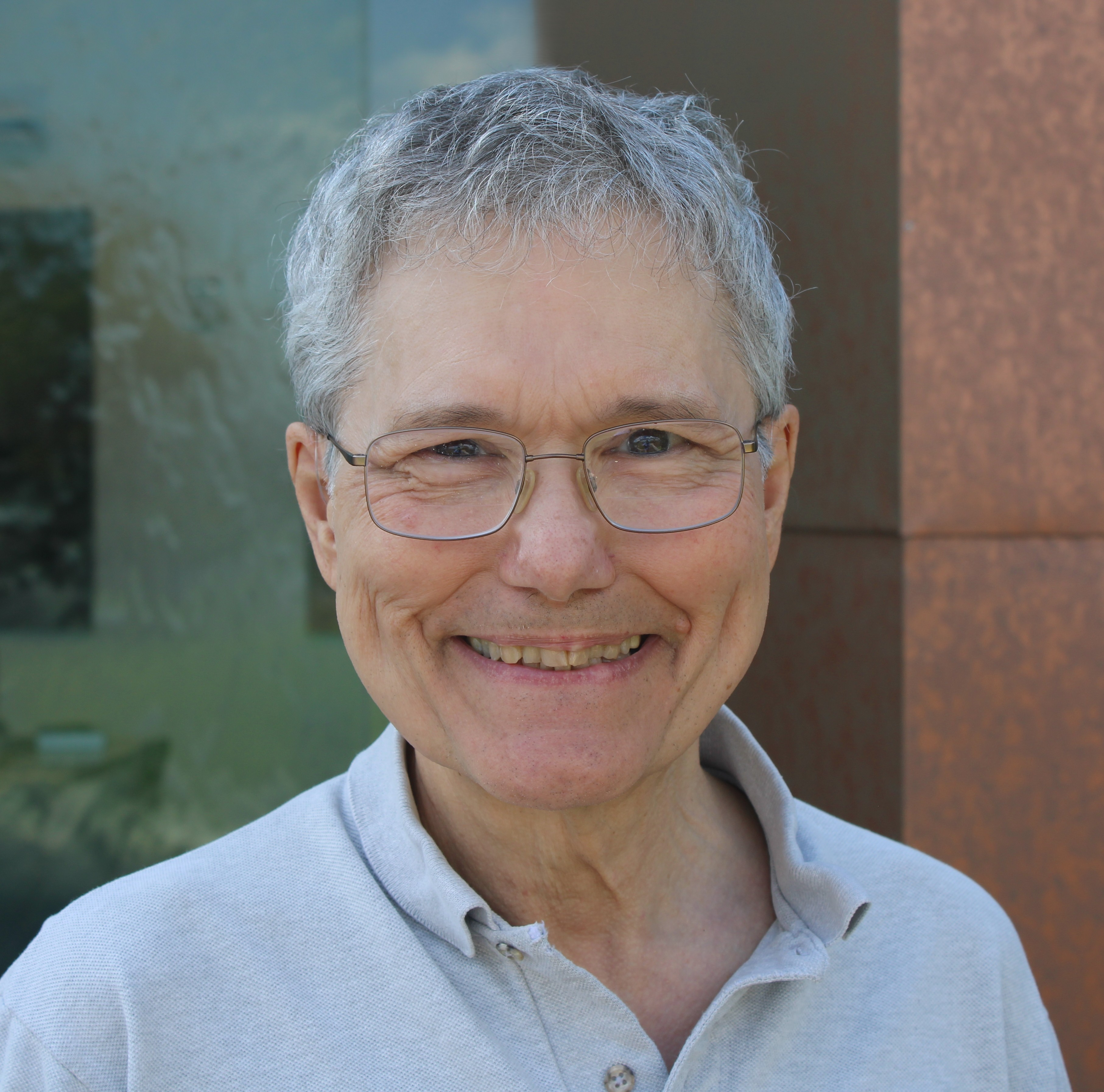
- Born: December 1951 (age 74); Illinois
- Education: Duke University - Ph.D., 1979; University of Missouri-Rolla - B.S., 1974
- Known for: automated planning and scheduling, HTN planning, game tree pathology
- Scientific career
- Fields: Computer Science, Artificial Intelligence, automated planning and scheduling, game theory
- Workplaces: University of Maryland, College Park

Dana S. Nau is a professor of computer science and systems research at the University of Maryland Department of Computer Science in College Park, where he has done research in automated planning and scheduling, game theory, cognitive science, and computer-aided engineering. He has many PHD students, including Qiang Yang who graduated in 1989. He has more than 300 publications and several best-paper awards. Some of his accomplishments include the discovery of game tree pathology, the development of the SHOP and SHOP2 HTN planning systems, and the book Automated Planning: Theory and Practice (ISBN 1-55860-856-7). He is a Fellow of the AAAI and in 2022 he was elected as a Fellow of the AAAS.

== Honors ==
- 1996 – Fellow, AAAI
- 2013 – Fellow of the Association for Computing Machinery
- 2022 – Fellow, AAAS
