= Hong Kong University of Science and Technology (Guangzhou) =

Chinese university in Guangzhou

The Hong Kong University of Science and Technology (Guangzhou)
- 香港科技大学(广州)
- Other names: HKUST (GZ)
- Type: Joint Venture
- Established: 29 June 2022; 3 years ago
- Academic affiliations: Hong Kong University of Science and Technology; Guangzhou University
- President: Lionel Ni
- Location: Nansha, Guangzhou, Guangdong, China; 22.89420°N 113.47828°E
- Campus: 1,669 acres (675 ha); Rural
- Language: English
- Colours: Blue & gold
- Website: hkust-gz.edu.cn

The Hong Kong University of Science and Technology (Guangzhou) (or shortly HKUST (GZ)) is a university in Nansha, Guangzhou, Guangdong, China. The university was jointly established by The Hong Kong University of Science and Technology (HKUST) and Guangzhou University. The university officially commenced in the year 2022.

== History ==
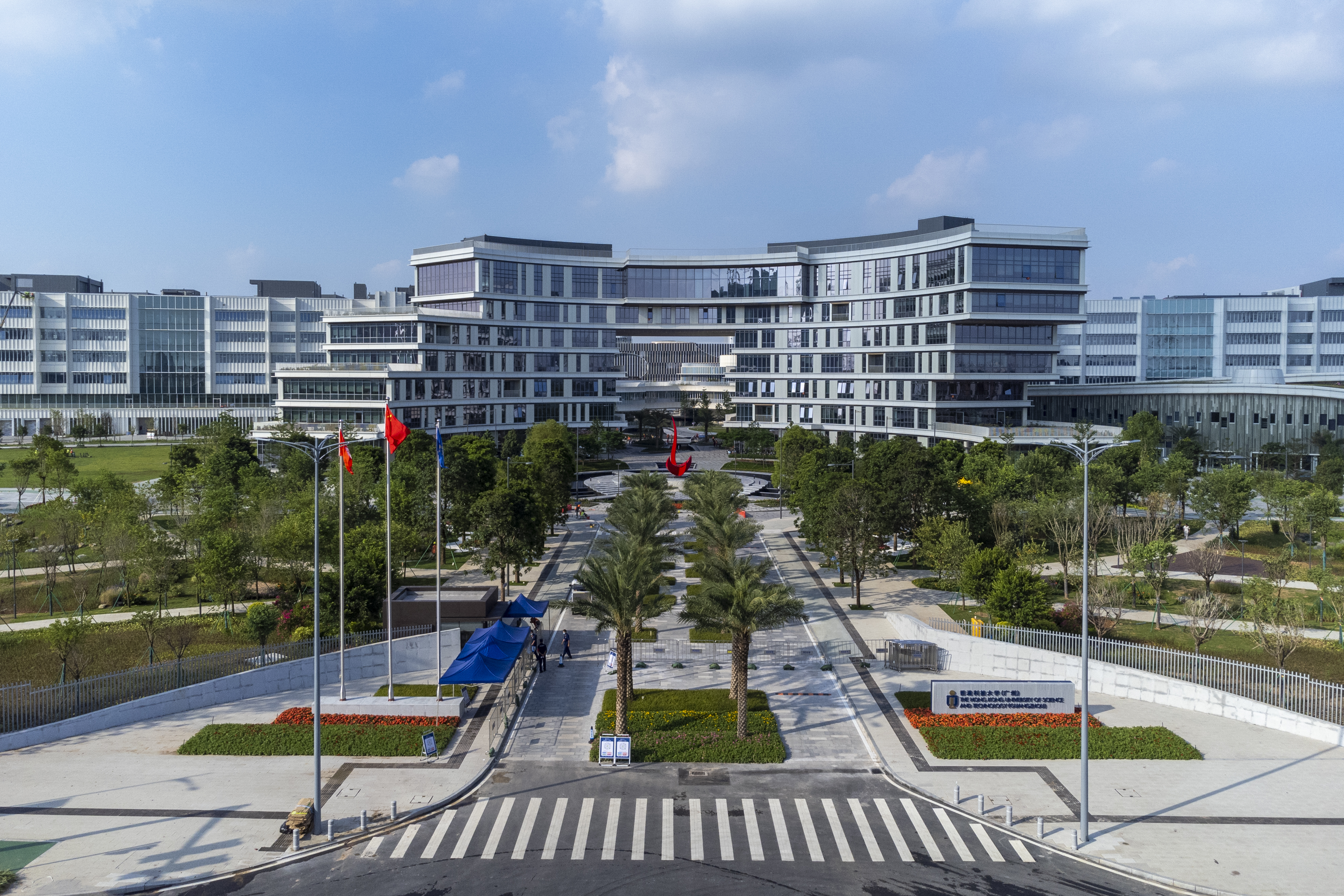
Main Entrance

In March 2017 the Mayor of Guangzhou Wen Guohui visited HKUST and invited the university to set up a school in Guangzhou. In August that year HKUST board chairman Andrew Liao and then-HKUST president Wei Shyy visited Guangzhou.

On 21 December 2018 HKUST announced plans to build a campus in Guangzhou when it signed a tripartite agreement with the Guangzhou Municipal Government and Guangzhou University. A site near Qingsheng railway station was chosen since it took only 30 minutes from it to the Hong Kong West Kowloon railway station.

In September 2019 the project received preparatory approval from the Ministry of Education. In the same month, a groundbreaking ceremony was held in Nansha to mark the start of the project's construction. Kohn Pedersen Fox was chosen to design the campus.

On 29 June 2022 the Ministry of Education announced that it had formally approved the establishment of HKUST (GZ).

On 1 September 2022 HKUST (GZ) official opened. Its opening ceremony was attended by several high level party officials which included Li Xi, Huai Jinpeng, and Wang Weizhong. Former Chief Executive of Hong Kong, Leung Chun-ying as well as current Chief Executive, John Lee Ka-chiu gave speeches at the ceremony through video.

== Campus ==
HKUST and HKUST(GZ) are under "Unified HKUST, Complementary Campuses" framework. Students of HKUST and HKUST(GZ) can take courses offered by both campuses, with credits mutually recognized and automatically transferable.

== See also ==
- Hong Kong University of Science and Technology
- Guangzhou University
