= Guangzhou University =

University in Guangzhou, China

Coordinates: 23.0388°N 113.3692°E

- 广州大学 (Chinese)
- Motto: 博学笃行，与时俱进
- Motto in English: Encyclopaedic studying, sincere practice, trend tide and welcome wave.
- Type: Public
- Established: 1927; 99 years ago
- Affiliations: Guangdong-Hong Kong-Macao University Alliance (GHMUA)
- President: Wei Minghai
- Faculty: 2,401
- Undergraduates: 30,024
- Location: Guangzhou, Guangdong, China
- Campus: Urban, 1.32 km^{2}
- Website: english.gzhu.edu.cn/index.htm

Chinese name
- Simplified Chinese: 广州大学
- Traditional Chinese: 廣州大學
Transcriptions
Standard Mandarin
- Hanyu Pinyin: Guǎngzhōu Dàxué
Yue: Cantonese
- Jyutping: Gwong2 zau1 daai6 hok6

Guangzhou University (GU; Chinese: 广州大学) is a public university in Guangzhou, Guangdong province, China.

Guangzhou University is currently one of the 13 high-level universities in Guangdong Province. Guangzhou University was established in 2000 through the merger of the former Guangzhou University, South China Construction Institute West Campus, Guangzhou Normal College, Guangzhou Institute of Education, and Guangzhou Higher Normal College. The university operates under a co-management system between the provincial and municipal governments, with the city taking the lead. The legal address of Guangzhou University is 230 Outer Ring West Road, University Town, Panyu District, Guangzhou, Guangdong Province, and it currently has three campuses: University Town Campus, Guihuagang Campus, and Huangpu Campus.

As of June 2022, Guangzhou University has 27 colleges covering 10 major academic disciplines in arts and sciences, with 30,043 undergraduate students and 6,951 master's and doctoral students. The university offers 10 first-level discipline doctoral programs and doctoral professional degree programs, 36 first-level discipline master's programs, and 27 professional master's degree programs, and holds the qualification to recommend students for exemption from the entrance exam for master's programs. As of June 2022, Guangzhou University has 5 national-level research platforms (including incubation bases) and 73 provincial and ministerial-level research platforms. Since 2016, the university has applied for 4,219 international and domestic patents, with 2,026 patents granted. In 2021, the university published 2,794 papers in SCIE/SSCI and CSSCI. In the same year, Guangzhou University's total research funding reached 1.123 billion yuan.

== History ==
Guangzhou University was reestablished in July 2000 by the Chinese Ministry of Education. It was a merger of five tertiary institutions previously known as Guangzhou Normal University (广州师范学院), South China Institute of Construction (华南建设学院), Guangzhou University (广州大学), Guangzhou Junior Teachers' College (广州高等专科学校), and Guangzhou Institute of Education (广州教育学院).

The university comprises 27 schools. It offers 76 undergraduate programs with coverage of ten disciplinary fields, including philosophy, history, literature, law, pedagogy, art, science, engineering, management and economics. Currently, the university is authorized to run 3 PhD programs with 25 grade-2 subjects, 26 graduate programs with 95 grade-2 subjects. In addition, the university offers 9 professional graduate programs in 36 fields, including pedagogy, engineering, physical education, art and international Chinese language teaching.

The university has a teaching and research staff of 2094, including two academicians of the Chinese Academy of Sciences and one academician of Chinese Academy of Engineering, 290 full-time professors and 604 full-time associate professors. The number of the full-time graduates and undergraduates is over 34,000.

The university participates in national and provincial research programs such as national "973" and "863" projects. It has established more than 30 research institutes or centers specializing in a wide range of subjects, including Interdisciplinary Research Center, Earthquake Engineering Research Test Center, Human Right Research Center, Research Institute for Computer Science & Software etc.

Up to 2011, the university has established the partnership with more than 100 overseas institutions. The university offers Chinese language instructions and degree programs for students from abroad as well as from Hong Kong, Macao and Taiwan.

The construction of the Guangzhou Higher Education Mega Center on Xiaoguwei Island (小谷围) is in progress.

Guangzhou University and the Hong Kong University of Science and Technology jointly established the Hong Kong University of Science and Technology (Guangzhou) which officially opened in 2022.

== Campus ==
There are now eighty student associations with more than 12,000 members at GZHU. These associations cover a range of subjects including humanities, technology, public service, arts, and P.E. etc. Each year, there is a cultural month reserved for activities of the associations in which student associations play an important role in moral education, science enlightenment, career guidance, and volunteer service.

== Rankings and reputation ==
The University Ranking on Academic Performance publications, authored by scholars from the Middle East Technical University in Turkey and co-contributed by European scholars from France, Netherlands and the United Kingdom ranked Guangzhou University at #153 out of the 183 nationally China and #1516 in ranking globally out of all the places of higher institutions in that category. The QS World University Rankings ranked the university 300th in Asia in 2025.

=== Nature Index ===
Nature Index tracks the affiliations of high-quality scientific articles and presents research outputs by institution and country on monthly basis.

Year	Rank	Valuer
2023	371	Nature Index - Academic Institutions - Global
2023	101	Nature Index - Academic Institutions - China

== Courses ==
While the undergraduate programs remain the dominant focus of its operation, GZHU also runs postgraduate programs. The university run 42 postgraduate programs and 62 undergraduate programs in eight fields of study including Literature, Science, Engineering, Economics, Management, Law, Education and History.

== Staff and students ==
GZHU has a staff of 2,588 including one academic scholar from the Chinese Academy of Science, one academic scholar from the China Institute of Engineering, four academic scholars employed on a part-time basis, 20 supervisors of doctoral students, 130 full-time professors, 567 associate professors; of whom all 100 are Ph.D holders, 32 who have been awarded the state Council Special Allowances, 14 provincial and municipal level experts. The University's current full-time postgraduates, undergraduates and diploma students number 17,000. The University enrolls students mainly from Guangdong Province and Guangzhou, but also admits students from 11 other provinces, Hong Kong, Macao and also from overseas.

== Research centres and other partnerships ==
The University has 57 research institutes and centers specializing in wide range of fields including the Institute of Educational Software, the Earthquake Engineering Research and TestCenter, the Institute of Educational Sciences, and the Institute of Advanced Manufacturing Technology.

GZHU has also established a number of cooperative educational establishments including the College of Textile and Garment, the College of Urban Construction Engineering, the College of Technology and Trade, Sontian College, Software Engineering Institute of Guangzhou, the School of Municipal Works and Construction. GZHU has established partnerships in a wide range of disciplines with universities and academic institutions of the United States, Australia, France, Russia, Italy, South Korea, Japan, Sweden, and Chinese-speaking regions including Taiwan, Hong Kong and Macau.
