= Panos Kalnis =

Greek academic

Panagiotis Kalnis is a Greek academic who specializes in cloud computing and databases.

== Biography ==
After earning undergraduate and master's degrees from the University of Patras in Greece, Kalnis completed a PhD at the Hong Kong University of Science and Technology.

Kalnis is a professor of computer science at the King Abdullah University of Science and Technology. While working there, he along with colleagues from Thomas J. Watson Research Center have developed a Pregel system called Mizan. He previously worked at the National University of Singapore, where he and his colleagues developed a tree traversal algorithm which showed suggested edit distance which in turn reduced computation cost. In 2009, along with Gabriel Ghinita, Panagiotis Karras, and Nikos Mamoulis from the University of Hong Kong, he created heuristics to solve the problems posed by k-anonymity and l-diversity data privacy models in linear time.
