= M. L. Chye =

Chinese biologist

Mee-Len Chye is a plant biologist and Emeritus Professor, University of Hong Kong. She was the Wilson and Amelia Wong Professor in Plant Biotechnology at the University of Hong Kong.
