= Jing Kevin Chen =

Chinese electrical engineer

Jing Kevin Chen is an electrical engineer at the Hong Kong University of Science and Technology in Hong Kong. Chen was named a Fellow of the Institute of Electrical and Electronics Engineers (IEEE) in 2014 for his contributions to compound semiconductor heterojunction transistor technologies.
