= Journal of Visual Communication and Image Representation =

- Discipline: Media studies
- Language: English
- Edited by: Zicheng Liu

Publication details
- History: 1990–present
- Publisher: Elsevier
- Frequency: 8/year
- Impact factor: 2.259 (2018)

Standard abbreviations
- ISO 4: J. Vis. Commun. Image Represent.

Indexing
- ISSN: 1047-3203 (print); 1095-9076 (web)
- LCCN: 91650264
- OCLC no.: 20665542

Links
- Journal homepage

The Journal of Visual Communication and Image Representation is a peer-reviewed academic journal of media studies published by Elsevier. It was established in 1990 and is published in 8 issues per year. The editors-in-chief are M.T. Sun (University of Washington) and Z. Liu (Microsoft Research). According to the Journal Citation Reports, the journal has a 2015 impact factor of 1.530.
