= Johnny Kin On Sin =

Johnny Kin On Sin (單建安) is a well-known professor of electronic engineering at the Hong Kong University of Science and Technology. He was named Fellow of the Institute of Electrical and Electronics Engineers (IEEE) in 2012 "for contributions to the design and commercialization of power semiconductor devices".

Sin was born in Hong Kong. He studied at the University of Toronto for his bachelor's (1981), master's (1983), and PhD (1988) in electrical engineering, and returned to Hong Kong in 1991 to join the HKUST faculty. He is a member of the executive committee of the charitable organisation St. James Settlement.
