= Zhao Tianshou =

Chinese scientist and educator (born 1961)

- 赵天寿
- Born: 1961 (age 64–65); Shaanxi, China
- Education: Tianjin University; University of Hawaii at Manoa
- Scientific career
- Fields: Energy Science
- Workplaces: Hong Kong University of Science and Technology

Chinese name
- Traditional Chinese: 趙天壽
- Simplified Chinese: 赵天寿
Transcriptions
Standard Mandarin
- Hanyu Pinyin: Zhào Tiānshòu

Zhao Tianshou (Chinese: 赵天寿; born 1961) is a Chinese scientist and educator currently serving as Cheong Ying Chan Professor of Engineering and Environment, the Chair Professor of Mechanical & Aerospace Engineering at Hong Kong University of Science and Technology.

== Education ==
Zhao was born in 1961 in Shaanxi. He received his bachelor's degree and master's degree from Tianjin University in 1983 and 1986, respectively. He enrolled at the University of Hawaii at Manoa where he received his doctor's degree in 1995.

== Career ==
In 1995 he joined the faculty of Hong Kong University of Science and Technology, becoming Chair Professor of its Department of Mechanical Engineering in 2011 and Dean of its Energy Research Institute in April 2014.

== Honours and awards ==
- Fellow of the Royal Society of Chemistry (RSC)
- 2007 Fellow of the American Society of Mechanical Engineers (ASME)
- 2010 "Chang Jiang Scholar" (or "Yangtze River Scholar")
- 2018 Science and Technology Award of the Ho Leung Ho Lee Foundation
- November 22, 2019 Member of the Chinese Academy of Sciences (CAS)
