= Kaikit Wong =

Electrical engineer

Kaikit Wong from the University College London, United Kingdom was named Fellow of the Institute of Electrical and Electronics Engineers (IEEE) in 2016 for contributions to multiuser communication systems and also a Fellow of the Institute of Engineering and Technology. Kai-Kit Wong received the BEng, the MPhil, and the PhD degrees, all in Electrical and Electronic Engineering, from Hong Kong University of Science and Technology (HKUST), Hong Kong, in 1996, 1998, and 2001, respectively. After graduation, he took up academic and research positions with The University of Hong Kong, Lucent Technologies, Bell-Labs, Holmdel, the Smart Antennas Research Group, Stanford University, and the University of Hull, U.K. He is currently the Chair of Wireless Communications with the Department of Electronic and Electrical Engineering, University College London, U.K. His current research centers around 5G and beyond mobile communications. He is a fellow of IET and also on the editorial board of several international journals. He was a co-recipient of the 2013 IEEE SIGNAL PROCESSING LETTERS Best Paper Award and the 2000 IEEE VTS Japan Chapter Award at the IEEE Vehicular Technology Conference in Japan in 2000 and a few other international best paper awards. He served as the Editor-in-Chief for IEEE WIRELESS COMMUNICATIONS LETTERS between 2020 and 2023.
