= Zhang Mingjie =

Chinese structural biologist

- 张明杰

Dean of College of Life Science, Southern University of Science and Technology
- Incumbent
- Assumed office 4 December 2020
- Preceded by: New title

Dean of School of Life Sciences, University of Science and Technology of China
- In office March 2015 – 2020
- Preceded by: Tian Zhigang
- Succeeded by: Xue Tian

Personal details
- Born: September 1966 (age 60) Ningbo, Zhejiang, China
- Education: Fudan University; University of Calgary
- Occupation: Structural biologist

Chinese name
- Traditional Chinese: 張明傑
- Simplified Chinese: 张明杰
Transcriptions
Standard Mandarin
- Hanyu Pinyin: Zhāng Míngjié

Zhang Mingjie (Chinese: 张明杰; born September 1966) is a Chinese structural biologist. He is Kerry Holdings Professor of Science and the Chair Professor of Biochemistry in the Department of Biochemistry at Hong Kong University of Science and Technology (HKUST). He was an overseas assessor of the Chinese Academy of Sciences. His research is focusing on molecular mechanisms of organization and regulation of neuronal signaling complexes and machineries in controlling cell polarity by using protein crystallography and NMR spectroscopy. In 2006, his structural and biochemical studies in signal transduction complex organization was rewarded for the State Natural Science Award (Second Prize), which is one of the most important national awards of science in China. In 2011, he was elected as an academician of the Chinese Academy of Science(CAS).

== Biography ==
Zhang was born in Ningbo, Zhejiang in September 1966, when the Cultural Revolution broke out. He obtained his B.Sc. in chemistry from Fudan University in 1988 and earned his Ph.D. in biochemistry from University of Calgary in 1993. On December 4, 2020, he was recruited as dean of the newly founded College of Life Science, Southern University of Science and Technology.

== Awards ==
- 1994, President's List, Natural Sciences and Engineering Research Council of Canada (NSERC) Doctoral Prize
- 2002, Outstanding Overseas Young Scientist Award by the Natural Science Foundation of China
- 2003, the Croucher Foundation Senior Research Fellow Award
- 2006, The State Natural Science Award (Second Prize)
- 2011, HLHL Advancement Prize
- 2018, Croucher Senior Research Fellowships

Educational offices
Previous: Tian Zhigang (田志刚)	Dean of School of Life Sciences, University of Science and Technology of China; 2015-2020	Next: Xue Tian (薛天)
New title	Dean of College of Life Science, Southern University of Science and Technology; 2020	Incumbent
