= Wei Zhao (computer scientist) =

Chinese-American computer scientist

Wei Zhao (Chinese: 赵伟) is a Chinese-American computer scientist who was rector (president) of the University of Macau from 2008 to 2017. He is chief research officer and professor at the American University of Sharjah in the United Arab Emirates.

== Education ==
Zhao received his undergraduate degree in physics from Shaanxi Normal University in Xi'an, China in 1982. He then moved to the United States to study at the University of Massachusetts at Amherst, where he earned his master's degree in computer science in 1983, and his PhD in 1986.

== Career ==
From 1990 to 2007 Zhao was a faculty member of Texas A&M University, where he was chair of the Computer Science Department from 1997 to 2001, and senior associate vice president for research from 2001 to 2007.

From 2007 to 2008 Zhao was professor and dean of science at Rensselaer Polytechnic Institute. He moved to Macau in 2008 to take up the position of rector (president) of the University of Macau. He held the position for nine years before resigning at the end of 2017 to join the American University of Sharjah as chief research officer in 2018.

== Awards ==
Zhao was elected an IEEE Fellow in 2001.
