= Mansun Chan =

Mansun Chan is an Alex Wong Siu Wah Gigi Wong Fook Chi Professor of Engineering and Chair Professor at the Department of Electronic & Computer Engineering, HKUST and Director of Nanoelectronics Fabrication Facility/Adjunct Professor, Peking University Shenzhen Graduate School. He was named Fellow of the Institute of Electrical and Electronics Engineers (IEEE) in 2013 for contributions to CMOS device modeling.

== Education ==
Chan obtained his BS degree in Electrical Engineering (highest honors) and BS degree in Computer Sciences (highest honors) in 1990 and 1991 respectively, both from University of California, San Diego. He then got his MS degree in 1994 and PhD degree in 1995 from the University of California, Berkeley.
