= Tony F. Chan =

Hong Kong mathematician (born 1952)

- 陳繁昌
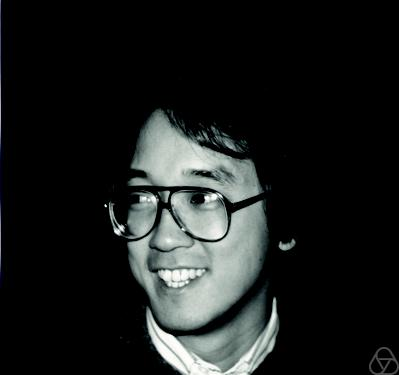
- Tony Chan in 1988

3rd President of the King Abdullah University of Science and Technology
- In office 1 September 2018 – 30 August 2024
- Preceded by: Jean-Lou Chameau; Nadhmi Al-Nasr (interim)
- Succeeded by: Ed Byrne

3rd President of the Hong Kong University of Science and Technology
- In office 1 September 2009 – 31 August 2018
- Chancellor: Donald Tsang; Leung Chun-ying; Carrie Lam
- Deputy: Roland Chin (Note: Took office as Deputy President and Provost.); Wei Shyy (Note: Took office as Deputy President and Provost; position later renamed as Executive Vice-President and Provost in 2013.)
- Preceded by: Paul Chu
- Succeeded by: Wei Shyy

Personal details
- Born: 20 January 1952 (age 74) British Hong Kong
- Education: California Institute of Technology (BS, MS); Stanford University (PhD)
- Known for: Mathematics for image processing
- Awards: NAE (2014); IEEE Fellow (2016)
- Scientific career
- Fields: Computer science and mathematics
- Institutions: Yale University; University of California, Los Angeles; National Science Foundation; King Abdullah University of Science and Technology
- Thesis: Comparison of numerical methods for initial value problems (1978)
- Doctoral advisor: Joseph E. Oliger

Tony Fan-Cheong Chan
- Traditional Chinese: 陳繁昌
- Simplified Chinese: 陈繁昌
Transcriptions
Standard Mandarin
- Hanyu Pinyin: Chén Fánchāng
Yue: Cantonese
- Jyutping: can4 faan4 coeng1

Tony Fan-Cheong Chan (Chinese: 陳繁昌; born 20 January 1952) is a Hong Kong mathematician who served as the 3rd president of the King Abdullah University of Science and Technology in Saudi Arabia from September 2018 to August 2024. He previously served as 3rd president of the Hong Kong University of Science and Technology from September 2009 to October 2018. Chan has been a professor emeritus of mathematics at the University of California, Los Angeles since 2009.

== Early life and education ==
Born in Hong Kong, Chan completed his secondary education at Salesian English School and Queen's College in Hong Kong.

Chan received a Bachelor of Science with a major in engineering and a Master of Science in aeronautics from the California Institute of Technology in 1973. He received a Doctor of Philosophy from Stanford University in 1978.

== Academic career ==
Before joining Hong Kong University of Science and Technology, he was the assistant director of the Mathematical and Physical Sciences Directorate at the US National Science Foundation from 2006 to 2009. He pursued postdoctoral research at Caltech as a research fellow, and taught computer science at Yale University before joining UCLA as Professor of Mathematics in 1986.

He was appointed chair of the Department of Mathematics in 1997 and served as dean of physical sciences from 2001 to 2006. He was one of the principal investigators who made the successful proposal to the NSF to form the Institute for Pure and Applied Mathematics, an NSF-funded institute at UCLA. He served as its director from 2000 to 2001.

He has been listed as an ISI Highly Cited Author in Mathematics by the ISI Web of Knowledge, Thomson Scientific Company.

He has been a professor emeritus of mathematics at the University of California, Los Angeles since 2009.

== Honors and awards ==
- Member of the National Academy of Engineering, 2014, "for numerical techniques applied to image processing and scientific computing, and for providing engineering leadership at the national and international levels."
- IEEE Fellow, 2016, "for contributions to computational models and algorithms for image processing".
- Honorary Doctor of the University, University of Strathclyde, UK, 2015.
- Honorary Doctor of Mathematics, University of Waterloo, Canada, 2022.

== Footnotes ==
Academic offices
Preceded by Chu Ching-wu	3rd President of Hong Kong University of Science and Technology; 2009 – 2018	Succeeded by Wei Shyy
Preceded by Jean-Lou Chameau	3rd President of the King Abdullah University of Science and Technology; 2018 – 2024	Succeeded by Ed Byrne
