= Wei Shyy =

Chinese areospace engineer (born 1955)

- 史維

4th President of Hong Kong University of Science and Technology
- In office 1 September 2018 – 18 October 2022; Acting: 1 February 2018 – 31 August 2018
- Chancellor: Carrie Lam; John Lee
- Provost: Himself (during acting presidency) Lionel Ni
- Preceded by: Tony F. Chan
- Succeeded by: Nancy Ip

Executive Vice-President and Provost of Hong Kong University of Science and Technology Provost (2010–2013)
- In office 1 September 2010 – 31 August 2018
- President: Tony F. Chan
- Chancellor: Leung Chun-ying; Carrie Lam
- Preceded by: Roland Chin (Note: Chin took the office as Vice-President for Academic Affairs (Deputy to the President).)
- Succeeded by: Lionel Ni (designate) (Note: The Office of the Executive Vice-President and Provost has been renamed as Office of the Provost since September 1, 2018.)

Personal details
- Born: 19 July 1955 (age 70) Hsinchu, Taiwan
- Citizenship: United States
- Scientific career
- Education: National Tsing Hua University (BS); University of Michigan (MSE, PhD)
- Fields: Aerospace engineering
- Institutions: University of Michigan; University of Florida; General Electric Research Laboratory
- Thesis: Analysis of hydrocarbon emissions from conventional spark-ignition engines (1982)
- Doctoral advisor: Thomas Charles Adamson
- Doctoral students: Marianne Francois

Wei Shyy JP (Chinese: 史維; pinyin: Shǐ Wéi; Wade–Giles: Shih Wei) is an aerospace engineer who served as the 4th president of the Hong Kong University of Science and Technology (HKUST) from September 2018 to October 2022. He is currently a professor emeritus of mechanical and aerospace engineering at HKUST.

Born in Hsinchu in 1955, Shyy completed his undergraduate studies at National Tsing Hua University in 1977. He then attended the University of Michigan and graduated in 1982 with a Master of Science in Engineering and a Doctor of Philosophy, both in aerospace engineering.

Shyy served as chair of the Department of Aerospace Engineering at the University of Michigan College of Engineering from 2005 to 2010. He joined HKUST in August 2010 to serve as the university provost. He served as the acting president of HKUST from February to August 2018, before he was officially appointed as the president of the university in September 2018.

== Education and early life ==
Born and raised in Taiwan, Shyy received his Bachelor of Science from National Tsing Hua University in Taiwan in 1977. He travelled to the United States in 1979 to attend the University of Michigan, where he received a Master of Science in Engineering degree in aerospace engineering in 1981. He received a Doctor of Philosophy from the University of Michigan in 1982. He was subsequently employed by the GE Research and Development Center in Schenectady, New York from 1983 to 1988, then joined the University of Florida faculty until 2004.

== Career ==
Shyy served as Clarence L. "Kelly" Johnson Collegiate Professor and Chair of the Department of Aerospace Engineering at the University of Michigan College of Engineering from 2005 to 2010.

In August 2010, Shyy joined The Hong Kong University of Science and Technology (HKUST) to serve as the university provost. In 2013, he additionally became Executive Vice-President at HKUST. He was appointed the fourth President of HKUST in September 2018, succeeding Tony F. Chan.

In November 2021, Shyy announced that he would depart from his position with effect from October 2022, almost a year before the end of his five-year term. Shyy gave no reason for his early departure.

While the societal challenges in Hong Kong were escalating to an unprecedented level in July 2019, he called for the underlying root cause of the society's reaction to the extradition bill to be identified and addressed.

On 8 November 2019, during the 2019–2020 Hong Kong protests, Shyy was presiding over a graduation ceremony when he was notified of the death of Chow Tsz-lok, a HKUST student. He paused the ceremony for a period of silent mourning. Later he called for an independent enquiry into the death. Shyy was one of three university heads in Hong Kong who did not express support for the imposition of the national security law, telling reporters that as it had already become law, he had "no need" to support it.

A signature view he promoted while presiding HKUST was to commit the university to addressing grand societal challenges. When COVID's damaging impact was globally spreading in 2020, he promoted the university's role to help find solutions in broad areas. In the context of sustainability and global warming, he was an early advocate to treat university as a living laboratory, to experiment, assess and test lab-based invention and solutions. If/when successful, these innovations can be scaled up to address society-wide needs. A key cornerstone for making such efforts successful is to develop system-wide, versus locally customized, cross-disciplinary pursuits. This view was a defining priority when HKUST (Guangzhou) was envisioned.

== Research ==
Shyy has made substantial contributions to air and space flight vehicle research and development, fluid machinery design optimization, and computational methods for complex unsteady flows. His work in flapping wing aerodynamics, surrogate-based optimization for space propulsion components and battery technologies, computational modeling for gas turbine combustor flows, cavitating and multiphase dynamics, power generation devices, biomechanical systems, and high performance materials processing are internationally recognized.

He and his collaborators were the first to:

- Identify the main sources of hydrocarbon emissions from spark-ignition internal combustion engines;
- Compute gas-turbine combustor flows for GE using 3-D Navier-Stokes equations on body-fitted meshes;
- Recognize and propose to adopt structural flexibility for micro air vehicles; and
- Offer an analytical framework to model the characteristics of glow discharge type of plasma actuator.

In addition, research by him and his collaborators has offered

- original insight into low Reynolds number aerodynamics for small scale flight vehicles and Mars helicopter blades (due to Mars' low density atmosphere)
- comprehensive framework and tools for surrogate model-based data analytics and optimization techniques using artificial neural network, statistical techniques and diver sources of data input

== Professional services ==
His professional views have been quoted in various news media, including the New York Times, the Washington Post, the Associated Press, the USA Today, the Christian Science Monitor, the New Scientist and the U.S. News & World Report. He also contributed multiple articles to the World Economic Forum.

He is the author or a co-author of five books and numerous journal and conference articles dealing with computational and modeling techniques involving fluid flow, biological and low Reynolds number aerodynamics, combustion and propulsion, and a broad range of topics related to aerial and space flight vehicles. He is General Editor of the Cambridge Aerospace Book Series published by the Cambridge University Press, Co-Editor-in Chief of Encyclopedia of Aerospace Engineering, a major reference work published by Wiley-Blackwell. His photos on birds and insects in motion have been collected as books, entitled Flight InSight and Flapping.

== Awards and honors ==
- Fellow of American Institute of Aeronautics and Astronautics (AIAA) & American Society of Mechanical Engineers (ASME)
- AIAA 2003 Pendray Aerospace Literature Award
- ASME 2005 Heat Transfer Memorial Award
- The Engineers' Council (Sherman Oaks, CA) 2009 Distinguished Educator Award
- Distinguished Alumnus Award, National Tsing Hua University (2013)
- University of Michigan 2013 Alumni Merit Award for the Department of Aerospace Engineering
- In 2021, the French Government made him an Officer of the Legion of Honor.
- 2023 Satya N. Atluri Award, International Conference on Computational & Experimental Engineering and Sciences
- Elected member of Academia Sinica in 2024
- 2024 The Meir Hanin International Aerospace Prize
- Nanyang Technology University S. Rajaratnam School of International Studies (RSIS) 2026 S.T. Lee Distinguished Annual Lecture

== Footnotes ==
Academic offices
Preceded by Tony F. Chan	4th President of Hong Kong University of Science and Technology; 2018 – 2022	Succeeded by Nancy Ip
