= Nancy Ip =

Chinese neuroscientist

- 朱葉玉如
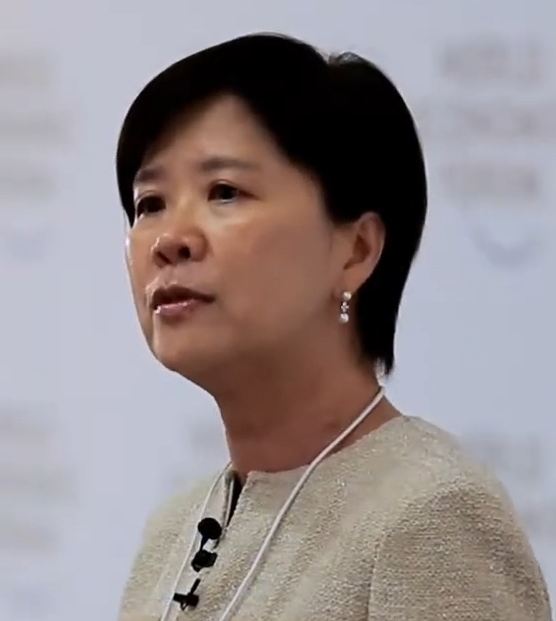
- Nancy Ip in September 2013

5th President of the Hong Kong University of Science and Technology
- Incumbent
- Assumed office 19 October 2022
- Chancellor: John Lee Ka-chiu
- Preceded by: Wei Shyy

Personal details
- Born: Nancy Ip Yuk-yu Hong Kong
- Education: Simmons College (BSc); Harvard University (PhD)
- Awards: L'Oréal-UNESCO Awards for Women in Science (2004)
- Scientific career
- Other name: Ye Yuru
- Fields: Neuroscience
- Institutions: Hong Kong University of Science and Technology
- Thesis: Cholinergic and Peptidergic Regulation of Tyrosine Hydroxylase Activity in the Rat Superior Cervical Ganglion (1983)

Nancy Chu Ip Yuk-yu (Chinese: 朱葉玉如; Jyutping: Zyu^{1} Jip^{6} Juk^{6}-jyu^{4}; also spelled as Nancy Y. Ip in academic publications) is a Hong Kong neuroscientist. She is serving as the 5th President of the Hong Kong University of Science and Technology (HKUST) since 19 October 2022. She had served as the Vice-President of Research and Development, the Morningside Professor of Life Science, and Director of the State Key Laboratory of Molecular Neuroscience at the HKUST. Since December 2022, Ip has also served as the deputy from the Hong Kong delegation to the National People's Congress.

== Biography ==
Nancy Ip was born in Hong Kong, with her ancestral home in Taishan, Guangdong. She is the youngest of six children. She attended secondary education at St. Mary's Canossian College.

She received her bachelor degree in Chemistry and Biology from Simmons College in 1977, and she earned a doctorate in pharmacology from Harvard University Medical School in 1983. After graduation, she spent the early part of her scientific career in the USA, and was Senior Staff Scientist at Regeneron Pharmaceuticals, New York.

Since joining The Hong Kong University of Science and Technology in 1993, Ip served as Dean of Science, the Director of the Biotechnology Research Institute, and the Head of the Department of Biochemistry. She is currently the Vice-President for Research and Development, the Morningside Professor of Life Science, and Director of the State Key Laboratory of Molecular Neuroscience at the University.

She has been elected to the Chinese Academy of Sciences (2001), the World Academy of Sciences (2004), the US National Academy of Sciences (2015), the Hong Kong Academy of Sciences (2015), the American of Arts and Sciences (2016), and the Chinese Academy of Medical Sciences (2019).

In 2004, she received the L'Oréal-UNESCO Awards for Women in Science Award at the 6th Annual L'Oréal-UNESCO For Women in Science Awards for her discoveries on the molecular control of growth, differentiation and synapse formation in the nervous system.

== Research ==
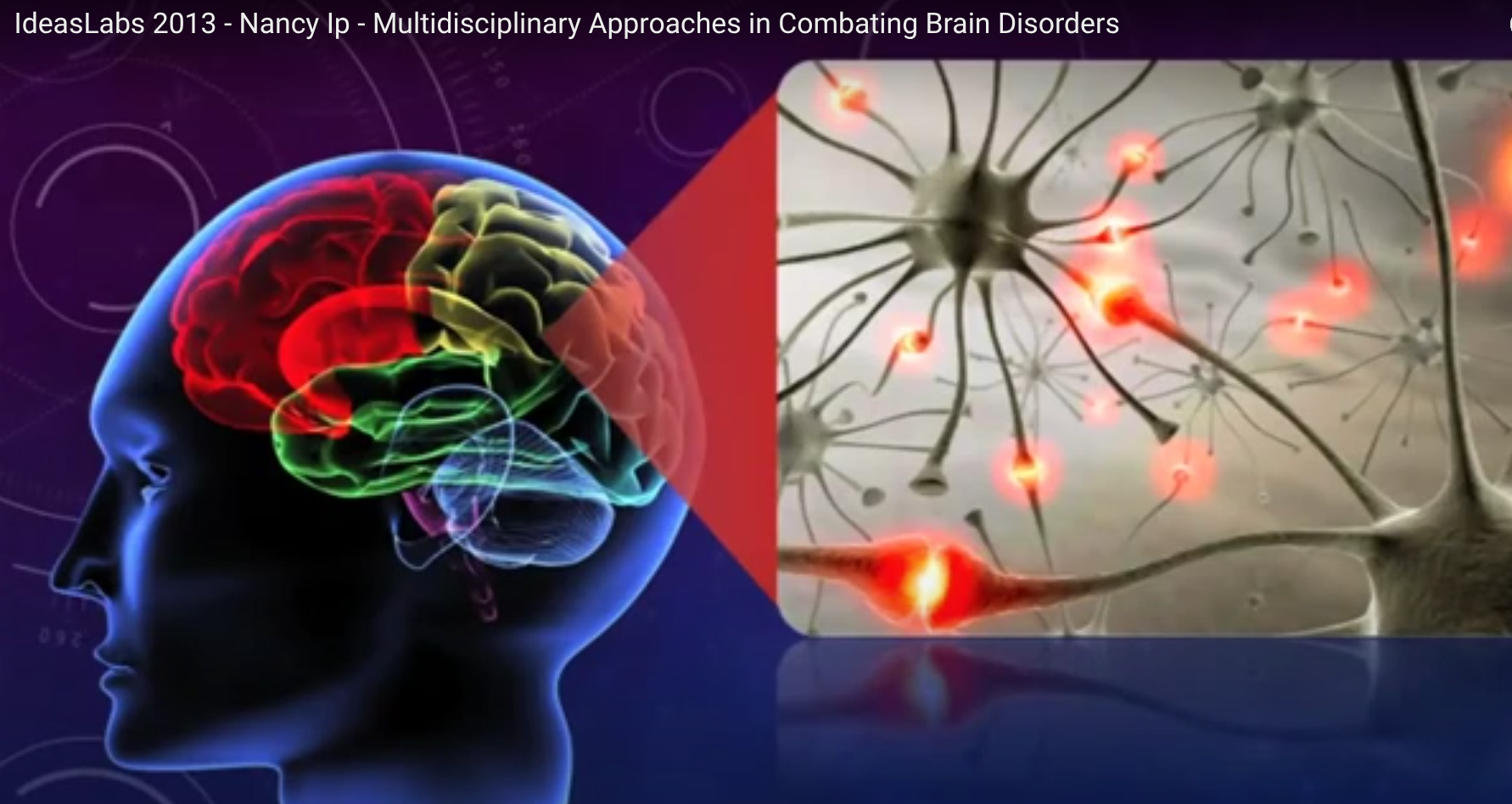
diagram from Nancy IP's 2013 presentation to the World Economic Forum

Ip has made several discoveries in neuroscience. She works with the biology of neurotrophic factors, specifically proteins that support the growth, survival, and differentiation of both developing and mature neurons. Her recent research to understand the deregulation of signaling pathways mediated by different classes of cell surface receptors has led to critical insights on the mechanisms underlying the pathogenesis of Alzheimer's disease, and unveiled new molecular targets and potential therapeutic strategies.

== Award ==
- 1998 - Croucher Foundation Senior Research Fellowship
- 2001 - Academician of the Chinese Academy of Sciences
- 2003 & 2011 - State Natural Science Award, State Council of the People's Republic of China
- 2004 - Fellow, The World Academy of Sciences
- 2004 - L'Oréal-UNESCO Awards for Women in Science
- 2008 - Prize for Scientific and Technological Progress of Ho Leung Ho Lee Foundation
- 2008 - Medal of Honor, Hong Kong SAR Government
- 2011 - Chevalier de l'Ordre National du Merite, France
- 2014 - Justice of Peace, Hong Kong SAR Government
- 2015 - Founding Member, The Academy of Sciences of Hong Kong
- 2016 - Foreign Associate, US National Academy of Sciences
- 2016 - Foreign Honorary Member, American Academy of Arts and Sciences
- 2016 - 10 Science Stars of China by Nature
- 2016 - Asian Scientist 100, Asian Scientist
- 2017 - Bronze Bauhinia Star (BBS), Hong Kong SAR Government
- 2019 - Fellow of the Chinese Academy of Medical Sciences

Academic offices
Preceded by Wei Shyy	5th President of Hong Kong University of Science and Technology; 2022 – present	Incumbent
