= University of Macau =

Public university in Macau

- 澳門大學; Universidade de Macau
- Motto: Humanity, Integrity, Propriety, Wisdom, Sincerity
- Type: Public Research Coeducational Higher education institution
- Established: 1991
- Academic affiliations: UMAP, IAU, IAUP, CRUP, AULP, GHMUA, UASR
- Chairman: Ip Sio Kai
- Chancellor: Sam Hou Fai (Note: The Chief Executive of Macau is the chancellor on an ex officio basis.)
- Rector: Yonghua Song
- Vice Rectors: Michael King Man HUI (Academic Affairs); Rui Paulo da Silva Martins (Global Affairs); Wei GE (Research); Mok Kai Meng (Student Affairs); Xu Jian (Administration)
- Academic staff: 769
- Students: 16873
- Location: Avenida da Universidade, Taipa, Macau; 22.0743°N 113.3244°E
- Campus: Suburb and concession 109.26 hectares (1.0926 km^{2})
- Medium of Instruction: English (main), Portuguese, Chinese
- Colours: Blue Red Gold
- Website: um.edu.mo umac.mo

University of Macau

Chinese name
- Traditional Chinese: 澳門大學
- Simplified Chinese: 澳门大学
Transcriptions
Standard Mandarin
- Hanyu Pinyin: Àomén Dàxué
Yue: Cantonese
- Jyutping: ou3 mun4*2 daai6 hok6

University of East Asia
- Traditional Chinese: 私立東亞大學
- Simplified Chinese: 私立东亚大学
Transcriptions
Standard Mandarin
- Hanyu Pinyin: Sīlì Dōngyà Dàxué
Yue: Cantonese
- Jyutping: si1 laap6 dung1 aa3 daai6 hok6

Portuguese name
- Portuguese: Universidade de Macau

The University of Macau (UMAC or UM) (Note: UMAC is widely used on university website domains, such as um2.umac.mo, or to distinguish it from other universities with the same abbreviation as UM, although the acronym is not recognized as an official abbreviation.) is a Macau public university located on Hengqin Island on land leased to Macau. It was established by the Macau legislature in 1991 and has been funded by the Government of Macau since then.

== History ==
=== 1981–1991 ===
In March 1981, the private University of East Asia was established. In the beginning, the majority of the students came from Hong Kong.

With the signing of the Sino-Portuguese Joint Declaration in 1987, in order to meet the manpower needs during the transitional period before the return of Macao, the Macao Foundation under the Government of Portuguese Macau purchased the private University of East Asia in 1988 for 130 million patacas.

=== Post-1991 ===
In 1991, the Legislative Assembly of Macau promulgated Decree-Law No. 50/91/M to establish the University of Macau as a new institution of higher education, and transfer all rights of the University of East Asia to the University of Macau without any formalities. All higher education courses, teachers and administrative staff of the University of East Asia, except for polytechnic higher education programmes, were also transferred to the University of Macau. The then Polytechnic Institute of the University of East Asia became independent as the public Macau Polytechnic Institute (now Macau Polytechnic University). The graduate school and the open college of the University of East Asia that were not purchased by the Macau government, were merged to form the private East Asia Open College (now City University of Macau).

In 1999, the handover of Macau to China took place. The new Judicial Regime of the University of Macau and the new Charter of the University of Macau were officially passed at the Legislative Assembly of Macau and came into effect in September 2006.

In 2009, the Central People's Government of China authorised the Government of Macao to exercise jurisdiction over the new campus of the university located on Hengqin Island, Guangdong province. On 20 December 2009, then President of China and General Secretary of the Communist Party Hu Jintao officiated at the groundbreaking ceremony for the new campus. In early 2013 the Macau Legislative Assembly passed Law 3/2013 providing for the application of Macau Law on campus effective on opening day. On 5 November, then Vice Premier of the State Council Wang Yang officiated for the new campus inauguration ceremony. In the 2014–2015 academic year, the University of Macau began to conduct all classes on the new and modern campus.

Faculty students and Macau residents can enter and exit the campus through an underwater tunnel. This means there are no border controls between the university and Macau.

With the approval of the Ministry of Science and Technology of China, the University of Macau has established three state key laboratories, namely State Key Laboratory of Analog and Mixed-Signal VLSI, State Key Laboratory of Quality Research in Chinese Medicine, and State Key Laboratory of Internet of Things for Smart City.

In 2016, the University of Macau established a residential college system similar to that of Oxbridge in the United Kingdom.

=== One university, Two campuses ===
On January 14,2024,The University of Macau announced plans to build a new campus in the western part of Hengqin island, which will be half size of the current campus. On December 12,2025, construction of University of Macau’s Campus in the Guangdong-Macao In-Depth Cooperation Zone officially began, which located in Hengqin Macao-Hengqin International Education (University) Town.

On August 1, 2026, as part of the cross-border and integrated development strategy for the "One university, Two campuses", Faculty of Science was reorganized into three faculties: Faculty of Information Science and Computing, Faculty of Engineering, Faculty of Science. Meanwhile, Faculty of Health and Science was expanded into Faculty of Medicine, and Faculty of Design was established as a new faculty.

== Rankings ==
University rankings

Global – Overall
- ARWU World: 301–400 (2026)
- QS World: 267 (2026)
- THE World: 154 (2027)
- USNWR Global: 206 (2026)

Regional – Overall
- QS Asia: 102 (2026)
- THE Asia: 28 (2026)
- USNWR Asia: 49 (2026)

The University of Macau is ranked No. 154 in 2027 Times Higher Education World University Rankings, No 28 in the THE Asia University Rankings, No 14 in the THE Young University Rankings, and No 1 in the Association of Portuguese Speaking Universities. It is ranked #267 in 2026 QS World University Rankings. In the U.S. News & World Report's Best Global Universities Rankings, it is ranked No. 206.

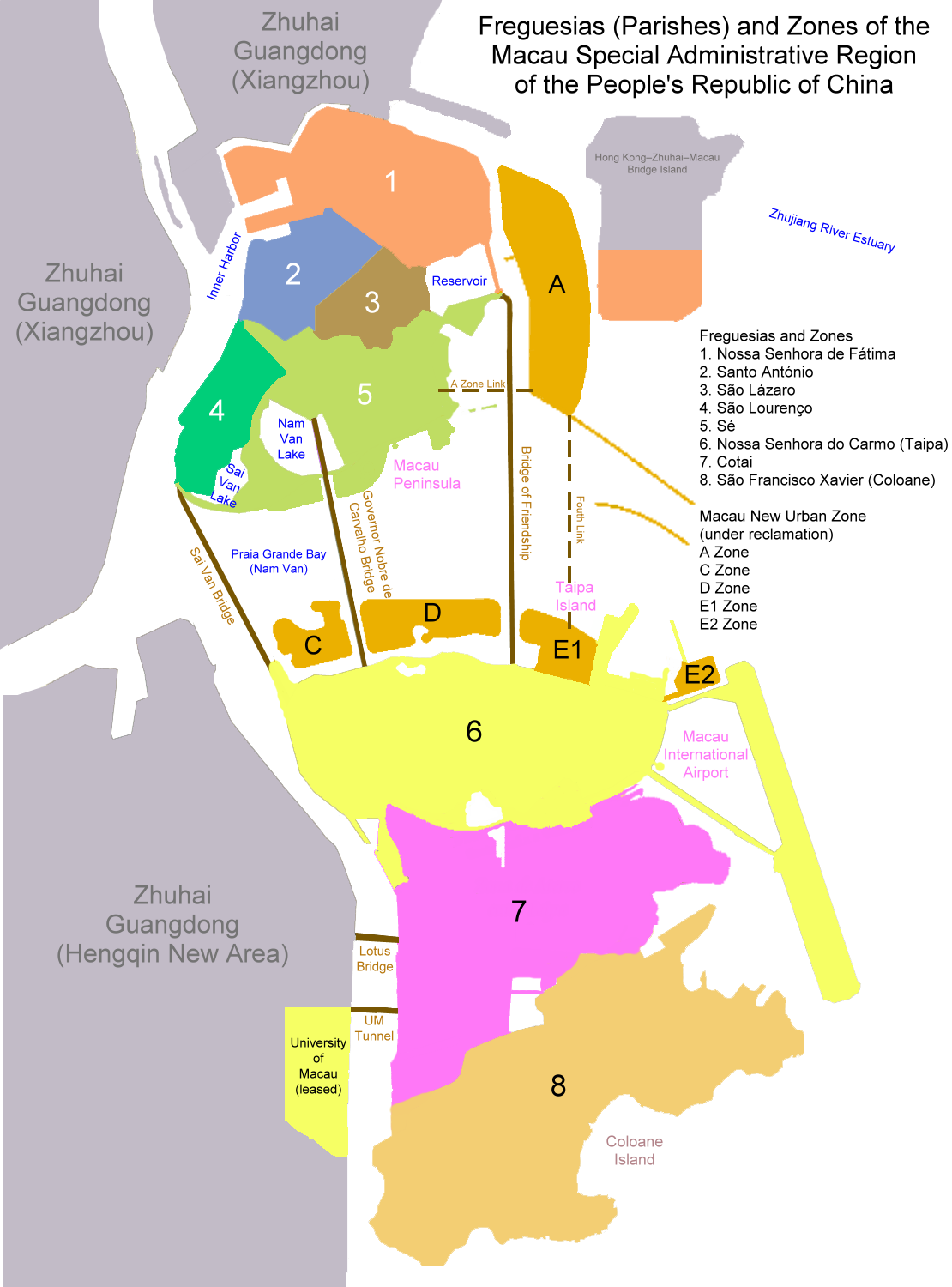
The University of Macau's campus lies across the river from Macau, connected by a tunnel

== List of Programmes ==
List of Undergraduate Programmes
| Faculty of Arts and Humanities (FAH) | Faculty of Business Administration (FBA) | Faculty of Law (FLL) | Faculty of Education (FED) | Faculty of Engineering (FEG) |
|---|---|---|---|---|
| Bachelor of Arts in Chinese Language and Literature; Bachelor of Arts in English Studies; Bachelor of Arts in History; Bachelor of Arts in Japanese Studies; Bachelor of Arts in Portuguese Studies | Bachelor of Science in Accounting; Bachelor of Business Administration; Bachelor of Science in Business Intelligence and Data Analytics; Bachelor of Science in Finance; Bachelor of Science in International Integrated Resort Management | Bachelor of Law in Chinese Law and Global Legal Studies; Bachelor of Law in Chinese Language (Daytime); Bachelor of Law in Chinese Language (Evening); Bachelor of Law (Conducted in Chinese and Portuguese); Bachelor of Law in Portuguese Language (Evening) | Bachelor of Education in Chinese; Bachelor of Education in English; Bachelor of Education in Integrated Science; Bachelor of Education in Mathematics; Bachelor of Education in Pre-Primary Education; Bachelor of Education in Primary Education | Bachelor of Science in Civil Engineering; Bachelor of Science in Electrical and Computer Engineering; Bachelor of Science in Electromechanical Engineering |
| Faculty of Science (FSC) | Faculty of Information Science and Computing (FIC) | Faculty of Medicine (FMD) | Faculty of Social Sciences (FSS) | Faculty of Design(FDS) |
| Bachelor of Science in Applied Physics and Chemistry; Bachelor of Science in Bioinformatics; Bachelor of Science in Mathematics with specialization in Mathematics and Applications; Bachelor of Science in Mathematics with specialization in Statistics and Data Science | Bachelor of Science in Computer Science | Bachelor of Science in Biomedical Sciences; Bachelor of Science in Pharmaceutical Sciences and Technology | Bachelor of Social Sciences in Communication; Bachelor of Social Sciences in Economics; Bachelor of Social Sciences in Government and Public Administration; Bachelor of Social Sciences in Psychology; Bachelor of Social Sciences in Sociology | |

List of Master’s Degree & Postgraduate Certificate/Diploma Programmes
| Faculty of Arts and Humanities (FAH) | Faculty of Business Administration (FBA) | Faculty of Design(FDS) | Faculty of Education (FED) | Faculty of Engineering (FEG) |
|---|---|---|---|---|
| Master of Arts; Chinese History and Culture; English Studies; Translation Studies (English-Chinese); Philosophy; Portuguese; Linguistics; Literary & Cultural Studies; Chinese-Portuguese Translation; Master of Philosophy; Chinese Linguistics; Chinese Literature; History; Master of Fine Arts | Executive Master of Business Administration; Master of Business Administration; Master of Science; Accounting; Business Analytics; Finance; International Integrated Resort Management | Master of Design in Industrial Design; Master of Design in Visual Communication Design | Master of Philosophy; Education; Curriculum and Instruction; Chinese Education; English Language Education; Mathematics Education; Educational Administration; Early Childhood Education; Educational Psychology; Physical Education and Sport Studies; Master of Arts in Teaching English to Speakers of Other Languages; Master of Science in Artificial Intelligence and Education; Postgraduate Certificate in Education; Pre-Primary Education; Primary Education; Secondary Education | Master of Science; Civil Engineering; Coastal Environment and Safety; Construction Project Management; Electrical and Computer Engineering; Electromechanical Engineering; Smart Ocean Technology; Smart Power Grid |
| Faculty of Information Science and Computing (FIC) | Faculty of Law（FLL） | Faculty of Medicine (FMD) | Faculty of Science(FSC) | Faculty of Social Sciences（FSS） |
| Master of ScienceArtificial Intelligence; Computer Science; Financial Technology; Internet of Things; Robotics and Autonomous Systems | Master of Law (Chinese Language); Constitutional Law, Basic Law and Administrative Law; Criminal Law and Criminal Procedure Law; Civil Law and Intellectual Property Law; International Business Law; Master of Law in European Union Law, International Law and Comparative Law (English Language); European Union Law; International Law; Comparative Law; Master of Law in International Business Law (English Language); Master of Law in Juridical Sciences (Portuguese); Master of Law in Juridical-Political Sciences (Portuguese); Master of Law in Macau Law and Practice; Introduction to Macau Law; Master of Law in Law and Technology *; *The programme is expected to be launched in the academic year 2027/2028, subject to the approval of the relevant government authorities. This programme will officially come into operation upon publication in the Macao SAR Gazette. | Master of Science in Global Public Health; Master of Philosophy in Medicinal Food and Nutrition Sciences *; * The programme is expected to be launched in the academic year 2027/2028, subject to the approval of the relevant government authorities. This programme will officially come into operation upon publication in the Macao SAR Gazette. | Master of Science in Mathematics | Master of Arts; Communication (Communication and New Media); Master of Social Sciences; Economics; European Studies; Clinical Psychology; Criminology and Criminal Justice; International Relations; Public Administration; Master of Philosophy in Macao Studies |
| Institute of Artificial Intelligence and Brain Sciences | Institute of Applied Physics and Materials Engineering | Institute of Chinese Medical Sciences | Institute of Microelectronics | |
| Master of Science; Cognitive Neuroscience; Data Science; Artificial Intelligence Applications; Marketing Analytics; Financial Technology; Data Strategy and Compliance; Precision Medicine; Computational Linguistics; Analytics in Teaching and Learning; Smart Governance | Master of Science in Innovative Materials | Master of Philosophy; Chinese Medicinal Science; Medicinal Administration; Pharmaceutical Sciences; Master of Science in Medicinal Administration | Master of Science in Microelectronics; Master of Philosophy in Microelectronics | |

List of PhD and Other Doctoral Degree Programmes
| Faculty of Arts and Humanities (FAH) | Faculty of Business Administration (FBA) | Faculty of Design(FDS) | Faculty of Education (FED) | Faculty of Engineering (FEG) |
|---|---|---|---|---|
| Doctor of Fine Arts; PhD in Linguistics (Chinese); PhD in Linguistics (English); PhD in Linguistics (Portuguese); PhD in Literary Studies (Chinese); PhD in Literary Studies (English); PhD in Literary and Intercultural Studies (Portuguese); PhD in Philosophy and Religious Studies; PhD in History | Doctor of Business Administration; PhD in Business Administration; Accounting; Business Analytics; Finance; Business Economics; Management; Marketing; Integrated Resort and Gaming Management; Hospitality and Tourism Management | Doctor of Design in Industrial Design; Doctor of Design in Visual Communication Design | Doctor of Education; PhD in Education | PhD in Civil Engineering; PhD in Electrical and Computer Engineering; PhD in Electromechanical Engineering |
| Faculty of Information Science and Computing (FIC) | Faculty of Law（FLL） | Faculty of Medicine (FMD) | Faculty of Science(FSC) | Faculty of Social Sciences（FSS） |
| PhD in Computer Science; PhD in Electrical and Computer Engineering; PhD in Electromechanical Engineering | Doctor of Applied Jurisprudence *; (* The programme is expected to be launched in the academic year 2027/2028, subject to the approval of the relevant government authorities. This programme will officially come into operation upon publication in the Macao SAR Gazette.); PhD in Law; Constitutional Law, Basic Law and Administrative Law; Civil, Procedural and Commercial Law; Comparative Law; Criminal and Procedural Law; European Union Law; International Business Law and Dispute Resolution; International Law; Jurisprudence and Legal History; Law on Technology and Medicine | Doctor of Public Health; PhD in Biomedical Sciences | PhD in Mathematics | Doctor of Public Administration; PhD in Communication; PhD in Economics; PhD in Psychology; PhD in Sociology; PhD in Public Administration; PhD in Political Science |
| Institute of Artificial Intelligence and Brain Sciences | Institute of Applied Physics and Materials Engineering | Institute of Chinese Medical Sciences | | |
| PhD in Brain and Cognitive Sciences | PhD in Applied Physics and Materials Engineering | PhD in Biomedical Sciences | | |

== Residential Colleges ==
In order to achieve “4-in-1” whole-person education for students, the University of Macau (UM) has fully implemented the Residential College (RC) system. Currently, UM has established 10 residential colleges, including:

- Chao Kuang Piu College
- Cheng Yu Tung College
- Cheong Kun Lun College
- Choi Kai Yau College
- Henry Fok Pearl Jubilee College
- Lui Che Woo College
- Ma Man Kei and Lo Pak Sam College
- Moon Chun Memorial College
- Shiu Pong College and Stanley Ho East Asia College.

== Football club ==
The University of Macau's association football team competes in the Liga de Elite, the top division of football in Macau. The team celebrated ten seasons in the Macau league system in 2025, first playing in the 3ª Divisão in 2016.

== See also ==
- Education in Macau
- List of universities and colleges in Macau
- St. Paul's College, Macau
