= Harry Shum =

Chinese computer scientist

- Born: Shen Xiangyang; October 1966 (age 59); Nanjing, China
- Education: Southeast University (BA); Hong Kong University (MA); Carnegie Mellon University (PhD)
- Occupations: Executive Vice President for Technology and Research
- Employer: Microsoft
- Awards: IEEE Fellow, ACM Fellow, FREng

Heung-Yeung "Harry" Shum (Chinese: 沈向洋; pinyin: Shěn Xiàngyáng; born October 1966) is a Chinese computer scientist. He was a doctoral student of Raj Reddy. He was the Executive Vice President of Artificial Intelligence & Research at Microsoft. He is known for his research on computer vision and computer graphics, and for the development of the search engine Bing.

== Early life and education ==
Shum was born and grew up in Nanjing, China. He earned his bachelor's degree from Southeast University, Nanjing, China, and a master's degree from Hong Kong University. He studied at Carnegie Mellon University and earned a Ph.D. in robotics from its School of Computer Science in 1996.

== Career ==
In 1996, Shum joined Microsoft Research in Redmond. He then moved to Microsoft Research China (later renamed Microsoft Research Asia) when it was founded in 1998. In 2004, he became the Managing Director of Microsoft Research Asia.

In 2006, he was promoted to Distinguished Engineer of Microsoft Corporation. In 2007, he became Corporate Vice President of Bing Product Development at Microsoft. In 2013, he took on the responsibilities as Microsoft's Executive Vice President, Technology & Research including oversight of Microsoft Research. Since 2016, he has been Microsoft's Executive Vice President for the AI & Research Group, leading the overall strategy and R&D efforts in AI while continuing oversight of Microsoft Research.

In November 2019, it was reported by Mary Jo Foley in ZDNet that Shum was leaving Microsoft on 1 February 2020. In March 2020, Shum was re-appointed as an adjunct professor at Tsinghua University's Institute for Advanced Study where he co-leads the computer vision and computer graphics PhD program.

In March 2023, Shum was appointed as the Council Chairman of Hong Kong University of Science and Technology.

== Research and awards ==
Shum has published over 200 papers at international conferences and journals. Most of them are focused on computer graphics and computer vision. He is a pioneer and proponent of research on interactive computer vision. He has published many important interactive computer vision papers on ACM SIGGRAPH. He was also active in Image-based modeling and rendering, which is an important field in realistic computer graphics. In recent years, since he worked on Bing he has been active in web search and data mining research.

Shum was named IEEE Fellow by Institute of Electrical and Electronics Engineers in 2006. In 2007, he was recognized as ACM Fellow by Association for Computing Machinery.

In 2017, he was elected a foreign associate of the US National Academy of Engineering (NAE), for contributions to computer vision and computer graphics, and for leadership in industrial research and product development. He received the Honorary Fellowship from the University of Hong Kong in 2017.

In 2018 he was elected an International Fellow of the Royal Academy of Engineering in the UK.

== See also ==
- List of International Fellows of the Royal Academy of Engineering
