= Robert Chung affair =

Hong Kong political scandal

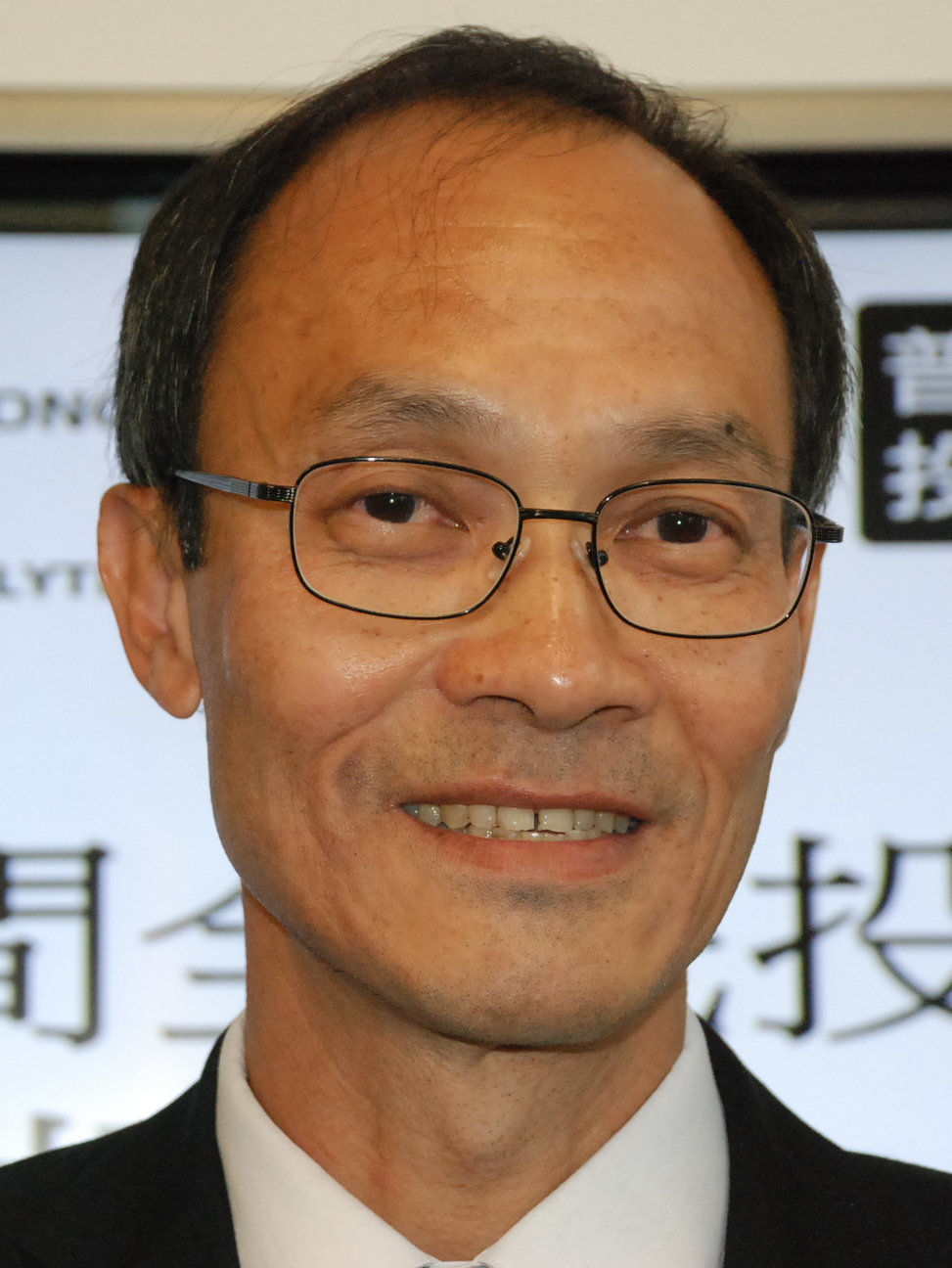
Robert Chung in 2014

The Robert Chung affair (Chinese: 鍾庭耀事件), or Chung affair or Pollgate (Chinese: 港大民調風波; lit. 'HKU Pollster controversies'), was a Hong Kong political scandal in 2000 concerning interference with the work of Robert Chung and the Public Opinion Programme of the University of Hong Kong (HKUPOP), which he led.

Chung accused the Chief Executive, Tung Chee-hwa, of pressuring him to stop publishing the government's approval rating, in messages conveyed by the vice-chancellor and pro-vice-chancellor of the University of Hong Kong (HKU). The affair attracted public interest because it raised questions of academic freedom and because of the cooperation of university officials with the Chief Executive. An investigation panel set up by HKU held Chung's allegations to be substantiated, after which the vice-chancellor and pro-vice-chancellor resigned. Tung's closest aide Andrew Lo, however, stayed in office despite his involvement.

== Background ==
In 1987, HKU established the Social Sciences Research Centre (SSRC) under the Faculty of Social Sciences with Wong Siu-lun, who would later become the pro-vice-chancellor implicated in the scandal, as the inaugural head of the centre. Robert Chung was then a deputy research assistant.

In 1991, the Public Opinion Programme (HKUPOP) of the SSRC was established and tasked with analysing Hong Kong's public opinion. A year later, the HKUPOP conducted its first opinion poll on the approval rating of the then-Governor Chris Patten and members of the Legislative Council; it continued to survey the government's approval rating.

In December 1998, the HKUPOP released the results on the performance of the government in POP Extra in December 1998, which revealed that public satisfaction with the Government had dropped from 43% in late 1997 to 28% in early 1998, and had further declined to 23% in late 1998. Tung's popularity rating dropped from 62.6 to 57.7 in a year. According to Chung, most of the newspaper used headlines to carry the polls and said that "the performance of the Government and the Chief Executive was at a record low".^{:5} The comments led to concern from the Office of the Chief Executive. In May 2000, the HKUPOP team was transferred into the newly established Journalism and Media Studies Centre.^{:5}

== 7 July: Chung's revelation ==
On 7 July 2000, Chung wrote in South China Morning Post and Hong Kong Economic Journal that Tung Chee-hwa, the Chief Executive, has been pressuring him "via a special channel" to stop polling him and his government.

Last year, more than once, I was given a clear message from Mr. Tung via a special channel that my polling activities were not welcomed. Mr. Tung did not like me polling his popularity, or the Government's credibility. I was told that he did not like to see universities involved in such activities and that our polls should stop.

— Pressure to stop opinion polls not welcome, South China Morning Post, 7 July 2000

In the past year or so, the CE, not only once, conveyed messages to the writer via some channels, saying academia should not poll performances of him or the SAR Government. The messenger even suggested to the writer to stop the work. Suddenly, the writer became a negative equity of the university. One simply cannot express such feelings with words.

— Does the Chief Executive value opinion polls? (translated), Hong Kong Economic Journal, 7 July 2000

On the same day, the Post reported the incident with "Tung tried to warn me off, says pollster" as the front-page story, soon raising a storm of controversies. The authorities immediately denied the accusations, while Chung, who was unaware that his article was to be made a cover story, was under great pressure to reveal the "special channel" referred to in his article.^{:5}

=== Reactions ===
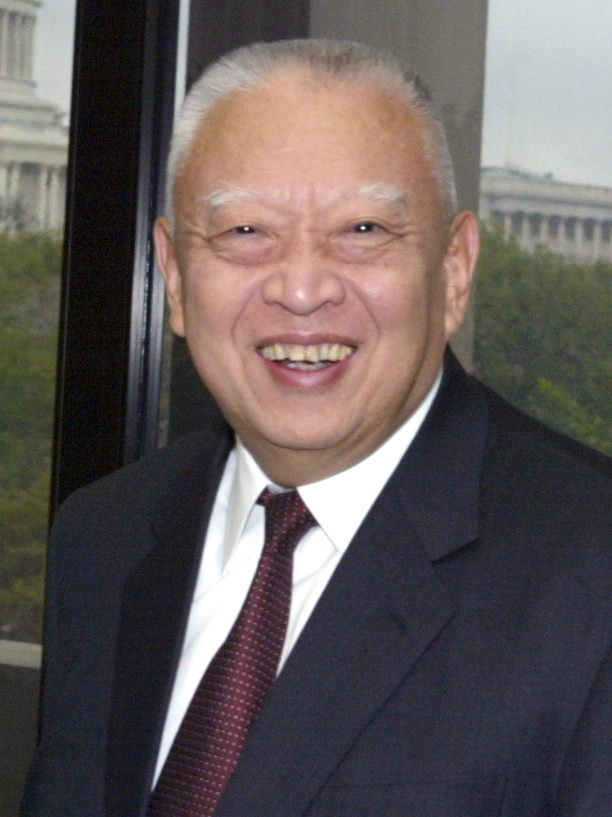
Tung Chee-hwa in 2005

Stephen Lam, Information Coordinator of the Chief Executive's Office, said in a statement that "[the] Chief Executive has not given any signals to Dr Robert Chung Ting-yiu to request him to stop carrying out his opinion polls." (Note: In the Chinese version of the statement, Lam said "the Chief Executive has definitely not conveyed any messages to Dr Robert Chung Ting-yiu to request him to stop his work of opinion polls.") Tung, in a luncheon, also affirmed that he is "certain" he did not request the HKU to end opinion polls. Leung Chun-ying, Convenor of Executive Council and later Chief Executive, said conveying messages via a third party is definitely not something Tung will do. Paul Yip, Special Advisor to Tung, agreed there might be some misunderstandings as "the government won't act such stupidly".

Anson Chan, the Chief Secretary, insisted the authorities will not interfere in academic freedom nor to exert pressure from behind. Chan criticised Chung for his "very serious" allegations that damaged Tung's image and government's credibility. However, just a day later, she clarified that she wished the Pollgate would come to an end in order not to impact the pollster's work.

After the government's categorical denial, Robert Chung, in the press conference later that afternoon on 7 July, was still muted on the third party involved and the "special channel" he was referring to. Chung said a third party did clearly relayed a message, which he understood as Tung was unhappy with academic work involving polling about him. Chung further said as Tung publicly acknowledged that he values polling by the academics and "at least from now on he will pay very good attention to opinion surveys and academics will not be interfered with or put under any pressure", then there is no need to identify the third party, "that's good enough for me". He added that he only hoped for a peaceful and quiet room to continue with independent survey. On the next day, Chung released another statement, denying any political motivation behind the Pollgate or any intention to harm the authority of the government. Chung said he would apologise to Tung if the scandal turns out to be a misunderstanding.

A spokesman from the HKU said no constraints had been placed on Chung's work nor would they be, and pledged there would be no cut in funding. He said he had no idea whether anyone had put political pressure on Dr Chung. The Students' Union called for an independent committee to be set up to investigate the controversy. Ying Chan, Director of Journalism and Media Studies Centre, said she has never heard of Chung under pressure nor the details of the event, and will ask him to give a clear account of the allegations.

Pollsters affiliated to local universities denied under pressure from the authorities, but Lau Siu-kai from the Chinese University of Hong Kong (CUHK) later confirmed having met Andrew Lo, a close aid of Tung, in February 2000, to discuss polls on Chief Executive.

=== Media reports ===
Local media carried the story with significant coverage with editorials commenting the serious accusations, urging Chung to make himself clear and tell the public who is the third party involved. Editorials of local newspapers on 8 July are titled as follows:

- "Single out the messenger" (Sing Tao Daily)
- "Robert Chung, please make yourself clear" (Ming Pao)
- "Robert Chung shall explain to the public clearly" (Hong Kong Economic Times)
- "The third party, face the public now!" (Hong Kong Daily News)
- "Reveal the third party and judge the merit" (Sing Pao)
- "The naked 'emperor' is indeed disgraceful" (Apple Daily)

Sing Tao Daily said this is not the first time since handover someone claimed ambiguously that agents such as "messengers" of the Chief Executive or Xinhua had been conveying messages. Hong Kong Economic Times said there is no appeal to motive Tung interfering Chung's work, let alone evidence. Ta Kung Pao, a Beijing mouthpiece, on the other hand denounced Chung of stirring up anti-Tung sentiments on the eve of legislative election with unsubstantiated and irresponsible claims, whilst calling for the prosecution of Chung for defamation.

Hong Kong Daily News and Sing Pao believed it is politically and practically impossible for the authorities to demand the university to stop polling. Ming Pao said the Pollgate is a matter of public interest, and will damage both the image of the government and the credibility of Chung if the mystery remains unresolved. Apple Daily slammed the government for unable to tolerate dissidents from unaffiliated and objective academic bodies.

The incident is believed to have undermined the reputation of the government and the Chief Executive because of reports by global news agencies and overseas media.

== 14 July: Chung's elaboration ==
Under immense pressure from the public, Chung held a press conference on 14 July to elaborate on the identity of the third party – Vice-Chancellor Cheng Yiu-chung, and disclosed the fourth party – Pro-Vice-Chancellor Wong Siu-lun.^{:4}

... After the publishing of the article, under the huge pressure of the government and the media, it is not convenient for me to contact the messenger: one of my most respected figures, my teacher [Wong Siu-lun]. Without his assent, I could not place him under such enormous pressure... I have decided to disclose the identity of the "third party": he is the Vice Chancellor Cheng Yiu-Chung. I will give an account of the course and content and time regarding the relaying of the message. I do not have any agreement with Vice-chancellor Cheng Yiu-Chung. There exists no moral obligation to protect the source of the information nor the moral obligation to keep confidential the content of a closed-door conversation. As my teacher has indicated that he respects my decision, I have performed the obligation of an apprentice toward his master. Regarding how the University will handle this issue, how my credibility will be evaluated by society, these are none of my concern.

According to Chung, who broke down twice during the emotional conference, he submitted files on pollster's funding and recent activities on 5 January 1999 under Cheng's request a day before. On 29 January, Pro-Vice-Chancellor Wong Siu-lun, who was the doctoral advisor of Chung, invited him to his office, saying Cheng was told the Chief Executive does not like the polling by him. On 1 November in the same year, Wong again told Chung the Vice-Chancellor was "very unhappy", and Chung requested Cheng to give an ending date of the polling. Wong further said Cheng warned reducing the financial support to the HKUPOP bit by bit if the polling work continues. Chung then submitted two written reports to Cheng, which Cheng later denied, believing the Chief Executive "misunderstood" pollster's work, and it would be "unwise" to terminate it.

After The Mirror, a pro-Beijing magazine, questioned the accuracy of Chung's exit poll in the local election and whether the university is "the remnant of colonial government and an anti-communist, anti-China fortress" in January 2000, Cheng asked university seniors for comments on the article. In the reply, Chung conceded to Cheng that he had become the burden of the university.

=== Reactions ===
The New York Times said, as Chung decided to name names, "a personal dispute has escalated into a furious debate over whether Hong Kong is stifling academic freedom".

==== 14 July: Enquiry announced ====
The HKU released a statement on the same day, 14 July, announcing an independent Commission of Enquiry will be conducted to look into Chung's accusations due to the serious nature.

Wong Siu-lun, in a press conference later that day, clarified the meeting in January 1999 was solely "exchanging views between colleagues". Wong said he told Chung criticisms from some members of the public, including the conflict of role as a pundit and a pollster head, and whether Chung is unbiased. He denied Cheng pressing for the end of the polling work, but admitted he "might have said" Tung did not like Chung's opinion polls.

Cheng Yiu-tong, who was travelling in Britain, released a brief statement on the same day, expressing his "extreme shock" and denied the allegations.

Chief Executive Tung said he has never asked anyone in the HKU to request Chung to stop conducting his opinion polls, neither has he asked anyone to convey any such message to the university. Tung affirmed that the Government "fully respects academic freedom and will not interfere with academic research". Tung's office said it fully supports the university's Commission.

The Students' Union, on the other hand, marched on the campus, calling for Cheng's resignation. They later called for a more independent inquiry and held a 16-hour sit-in outside the vice-chancellor's home.

==== 20 July: Lo's reply ====
As concerns and speculations grew, Andrew Lo, Chief Executive's Senior Special Assistant and one of the closest aid of Tung, released a statement on 20 July, confirming he had met with "people from various sectors of the community" and had "all along discussed these issues with my contacts with an open mind". Lo denied interfering the work of others, "and in fact it is not possible for me to do so".

On 21 July upon returning to Hong Kong, Cheng confirmed Tung never discussed Chung's pollster with him, nor asking for the end of polling. However, Cheng revealed he met Lo after his invitation in January 1999. The two discussed the HKUPOP in the Vice-Chancellor's office, such as the role of the university in the polling and Chung's conflict of role. Cheng insisted neither was he under Lo's pressure nor did he urged Chung to suspend his work, merely expressing concerns over the quality of research. Cheng, nevertheless, conceded his "political sensitivity and communication work were insufficient" for not realising speculations could have been triggered by reporting Lo's comments.

Cheng also acknowledged the pollster was discussed with the Pro-Vice-Chancellors in January 2000. Cheng Kai-ming, one of the attending vice-headmasters, said it was unprecedented for the Senior Management Team (SMT) to consider criticisms against academic researches from the public in the public. Cheng confirmed the deliberation focused on the Mirror's article as it targeted the reputation of the HKU.

After Cheng's press conference, Lo said the meeting with Cheng "was to gain a fuller understanding regarding opinion polls in general" wishing to be "enlightened". Lo said he did not discuss the matter further with Cheng, did not take any further steps to pursue the matter, did not request the university to take any action, and did not exert any pressure on the university.

Three days later, Arthur Li, Vice-Chancellor of the CUHK, disclosed a meeting with Lo in January 1999 which touched on Hong Kong Institute of Asia-Pacific Studies (HKIAPS), the pollster of the university. According to Li, Lo then met Lau Siu-kai and Wong Ka-ying of the HKIAPS.

Elaborating more on the meeting with Cheng, Lo confirmed the reports of meeting Cheng and Li "to establish contact to facilitate future liaison". Describing the "cordial" discussion with Cheng was "courtesy in nature to make his acquaintance", Lo said he did not report on these discussions, including that with Li, to Tung. He added he is prepared to fully cooperate and attend the Commission of Enquiry.

On the other hand, the Government said it is "fully committed to the protection of academic freedom" and the Chief Executive's Office will cooperate with the independent commission. Chan, the Chief Secretary, also endorsed the Commission and hoped "nobody will point an accusing finger at anybody" before the true fact is established.

Henry Tang, Executive Council member, welcomes Chung's decision to reveal the third party, but urged Chung to apologise for damaging Tung's credibility despite the Chief Executive did not exert pressure. Chung, in reply, said he should wait until the enquiry concludes the results.

=== Academics slam interference ===
Describing Cheng's actions as damaging academic culture and ethics, university academics slammed Cheng for not upholding the academic freedom, instead undermining the researches by conveying messages from the authorities. Ying Chan of Journalism and Media Studies Centre denounced the meeting between Cheng and Lo as "very wrong, absolutely unacceptable".

== Hearing ==
=== Panel established ===
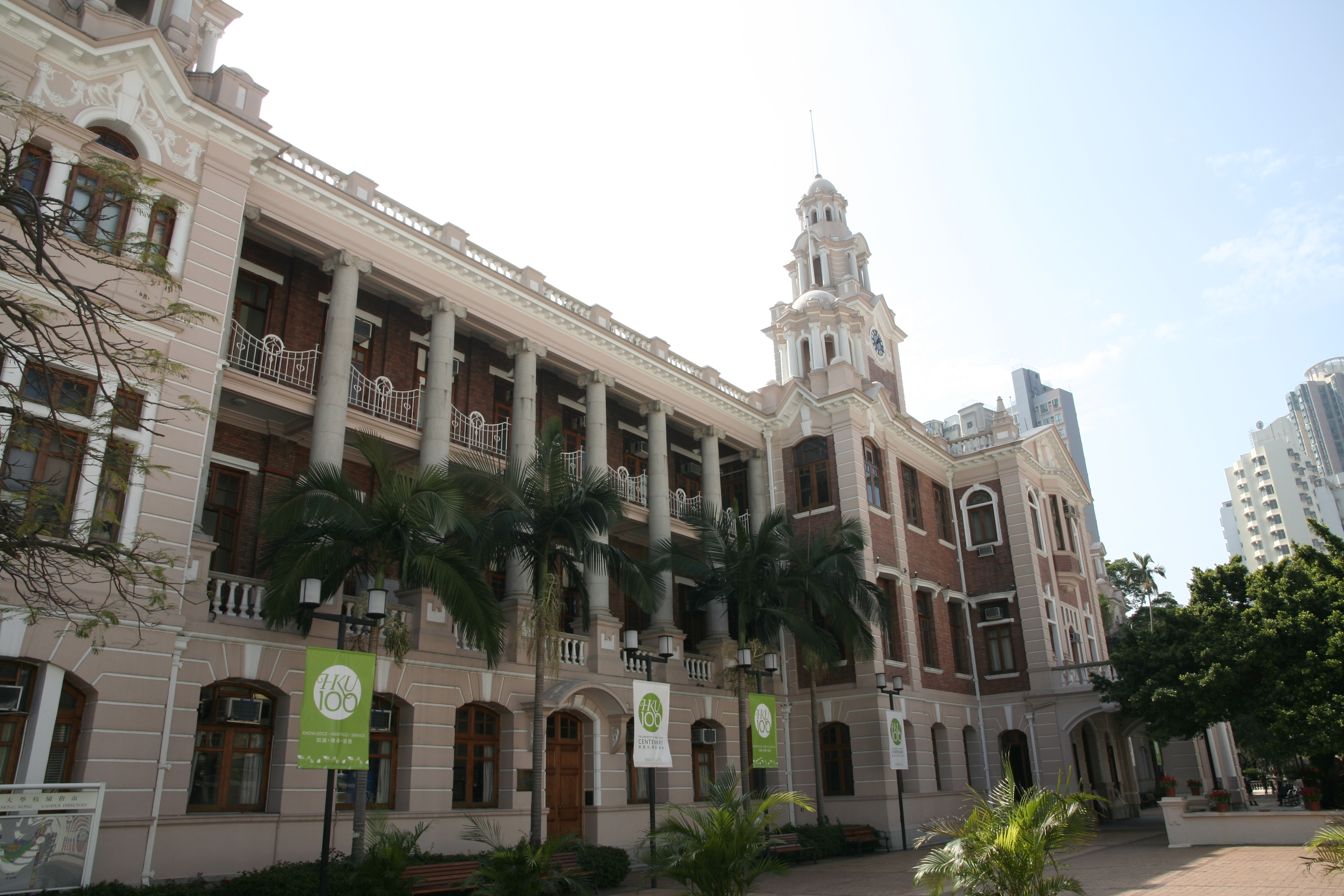
Main Building of the University of Hong Kong, in 2013

Given the allegation of interference was so grave, the University Council resolved to set up an enquiry under Arrangement of Statutes after an extraordinary meeting on 25 July, to ascertain the facts surrounding Chung's allegations and "report to the Council in writing on the panel's findings together with the panel's opinion pursuant to such findings and recommendation (if any) for action by the Council".^{:4}

The Independent Investigation Panel consisted of Sir Noel Power, non-permanent judge of the Court of Final Appeal and former Chief Justice of the Supreme Court, Ronny Wong, former chairman of Bar Association, and Pamela Chan, Chief Executive of Consumer Council. The hearings of the Panel will be open to the public, and may summon any officers of the university considered to be relevant by the Panel. Witnesses who appear and give evidence at the hearings may be represented by legal representatives.^{:4}

On 1 August, Tung announced he had turned down the invitation from the Panel to attend the hearing as he must protect the dignity of his office, and had "no relevant information to offer", but "will be most willing to assist". Tung also agreed that Andrew Lo may attend the hearing and provide the information.

The preliminary hearing commenced on 2 August and the full hearings taking evidence started on 7 August. The televised sittings were held on working days only and lasted for 11 days until 21 August.

=== Chung–Wong meeting ===
Chung and Wong testified that the Vice-chancellor expressed his dissatisfaction with Chung's polling, and some members of the public argued the pollster is not unbiased and would harm the overall development of the university. Both agreed the pollster was not asked to terminate its work in the first meeting on 29 January. There are, however, multiple contradictions between two testimonies.

Chung said in the first meeting between the two, he was given a message that "Tung had indicated to the vice-chancellor that he did not like the opinion polls that we were conducting [...] especially the polls which gave ratings on the chief executive's popularity as well as the [government's] performance". Several months later, in the second meeting on 1 November, Chung was told by Wong that Cheng "was most unhappy that he had continued to conduct his polls and it would be best to stop, otherwise his funding might dry up." Chung claimed Wong thinks general polling is fine but the CE-rating polling shall be avoided.

Wong insisted the meetings with Chung were completely under his initiative, and confirmed the first meeting came after the university management team considered the comments from the Chief Executive Office over the polling and after the criticisms from some of the colleagues. Wong told the Panel that during the second meeting, he told Chung the Vice-chancellor was "very unhappy" that the university is embroiled in political debate again as Martin Lee, chairman of the Democratic Party, slammed the authorities citing the HKUPOP's poll. In light of such, he reminded Chung that the Chief Executive Office raised objections on the polling. The Pro-vice-chancellor agreed that he recommended Chung to allocate more resources to sophisticated policy researches as there had been too many low-value Chief Executive polling in the past two years. Nevertheless, Wong rejected Chung's claim that he requested Chung to give a date to end the work. He also resolutely denied warning Chung that the pollster could be "yum gone" (Yue Chinese: 陰乾, i.e. dried up) by the Vice-chancellor, describing it as a vulgar term and believed it is not practical in the university.

Wong reported the details of the two meetings to Cheng on 12 November but did not provide him the explanations of Chung regarding the matters discussed. Wong also questioned the motive of Chung to disclose despite under pressure for a long time and claimed it is related to his recently conferred doctorate. Wong, in conclusion, defended the differences as "misinterpretations" but not lying.

He later revealed that Chung was concern the article by The Mirror on the university's "anti-China" stance could unfairly marginalise the university. Chow Shew-ping, another Pro-vice-chancellor, confirmed the information.

=== Cheng–Lo meeting ===
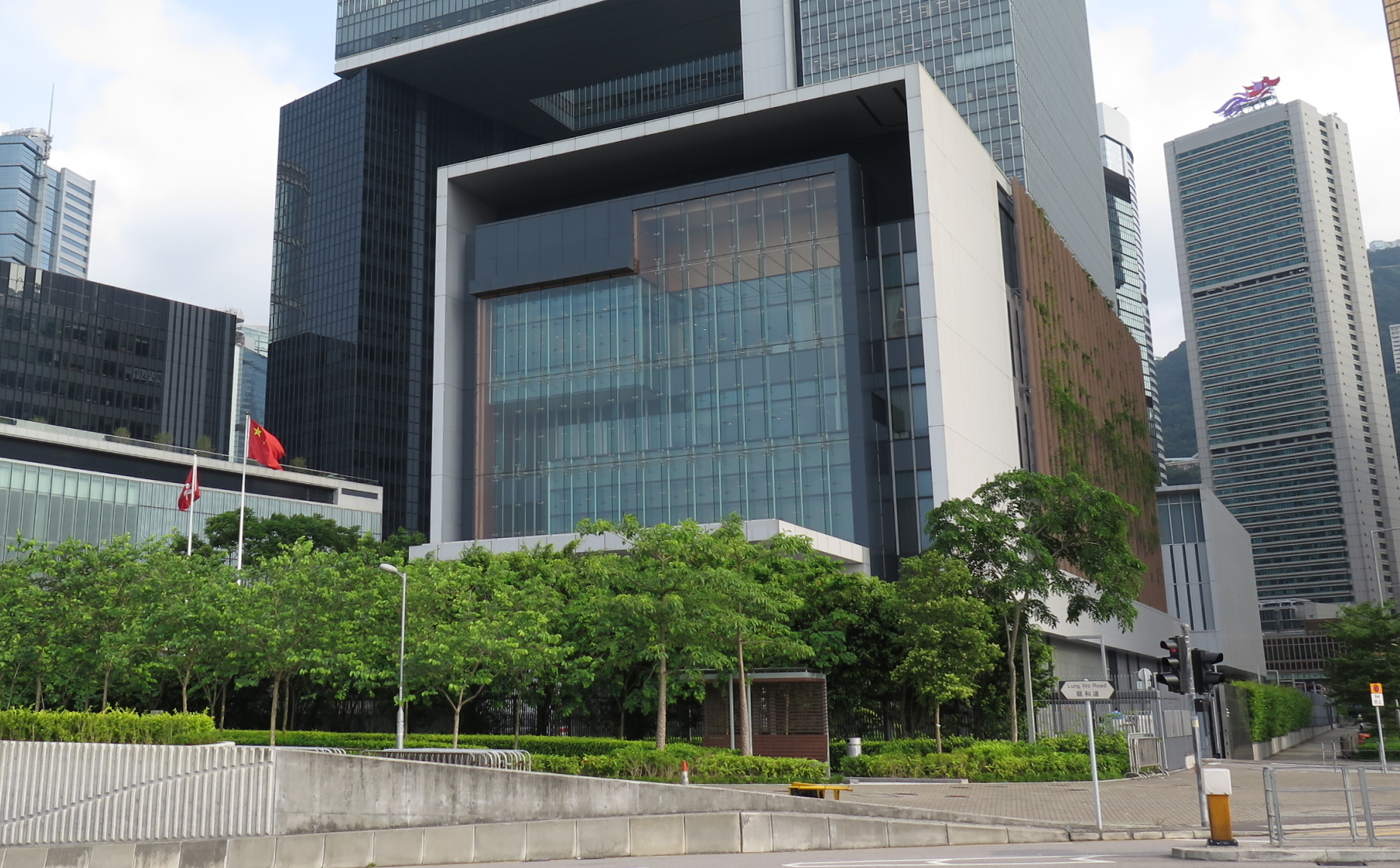
Office of the Chief Executive, in 2014

Cheng, the headmaster, described that the discussion between Lo and him on 6 January 1999 was quite normal. Lo did not ask for anything and neither did he ask Wong to forward any messages. He said he only stressed his desire not to tie Chung's survey with the university to avoid confusion. According to Cheng, Lo did not mention Tung's discontent, or the polling result in late December 1998. He had not taken any action regarding the polling other than the discussing it in a meeting with the colleagues. The HKUPOP was not even mentioned during his three meetings between March 1999 and May 2000 with the Chief Executive.

After Chung telephoned him before the meeting enquiring if he is particularly interested in anything, Lo claimed he "suddenly thought of" the SSRC and thus mentioned that to Cheng. The chat covered the development of the university and the pollster, and the name of Chung was mentioned in the course of conversation, who Lo felt had very strong views about politics. Chung said the enquiry was merely out of courtesy. Lo, upon concerning whether the opinion polling were done in Robert Chung's personal capacity or in the name of the Hong Kong University, further raised questions on Chung's possible conflict of role as a commentator and a pollster. Cheng said he is unable to answer as he is an academic in science. Lo said the meeting was coherent and natural.

The leader's aide later amended his written testimony and stated he did not name anyone whilst quiring the conflicting role, and he had no intention to criticise anyone but only asked a question just like in lesson. Under cross-examination, Lo compared himself to a parrot when the two talked about academic freedom, "after he said a word, I followed him and said a word".

=== Other testimonies ===
Julita Kwan, Senior Assistant Registrar of Vice-Chancellor's Office, said she "very vaguely" remembered mention of a "special visitor from the CE's office", i.e., Lo, at a Senior Management Team meeting when Cheng said Lo "raised concerns about supervision, about role conflict and so on."^{:7}

In March 1999, Pro-Vice-Chancellor Cheng Kai-ming set up an Ad Hoc Group and recommended establishing an Institute for Policies and Strategic Studies to improve the academic research. Felice Lieh-Mak, who chaired the said Ad Hoc Group, said Cheng told her and Cheng Kai-ming on 11 May 1999 "about the meeting that he had with the Chief Executive" on three issues, "all of them political on nature. The third issue was on Dr. Robert Chung and his negative polls. As related by the Vice-Chancellor, the Chief Executive expressed some concerns about it, so [The Vice-Chancellor] went on to suggest that it might be a good idea for the proposed institute [...] to oversee the work of Dr. Robert Chung". Lieh-Mak believes exerting any pressure would be counterproductive, and following the incident that the university was under political pressure,^{:9} as she perceived that "the Chief Executive really wants the vice-chancellor to do [something]".

Cheng Kai-ming also said the Vice-Chancellor discussed Chung's pollster with Tung, and "the Vice-Chancellor did express some worry" over Tung's concern. The Pro-Vice-Chancellor added that he heard the headmaster mentioned people around Tung were unhappy about what the university was doing, and, on those occasions at least once or twice Chung's POP was mentioned.^{:9}

Vice-Chancellor Cheng said he had "no recollection of" that meeting and never recall any incidents of Tung "going into those kind of details".^{:9}

== Conclusion ==
The Panel compiled the 74-page "damning" report of the Pollgate on 26 August, and was published by the council on 1 September. Recognising the gravity of the matter and that the "evidential standard must be a high one", the Panel applied the criminal standard of proof, i.e., proof beyond reasonable doubt.^{:13} The report concluded Cheng Yiu-chung first requested Robert Chung to submit details of the HKUPOP on 4 January 1999, and met Andrew Lo two days later. Lo, in the meeting amidst the drop of government's popularity, expressed hope to stop unfavourable polling results against the authorities from publishing and asked the university to follow up. Cheng then conveyed the concerns by the Chief Executive in three sittings with the senior colleagues, and urged Wong to forward the message. Thus there were the two meetings between Wong and Chung motivated by political considerations, which Wong requested Chung to stop any publications that harm the governance, or the pollster could be dried up.

Regarding Lo as "a poor and untruthful witness", the Panel said it was left with "the clear impression" that Lo was not recounting what had actually happened, rather "giving a sanitized version of that conversation in order to distance himself as far as he could from any suggestion of criticism of the work of Dr. Chung." The Panel further did not accept the evidence of Cheng as to that conversation for not disclosing the full and truthful extent of the meeting, but the enquiry believed no action of any sort had been taken apart from the mention of the matter in the SMT meeting.^{:6,13}

In the opinion part, the Panel, who had "no hesitation" in believing Chung as an honest witness who told the truth, wrote:^{:13}

We are sure that as a result of the conversation between Mr. Lo and the Vice-Chancellor on 6th January, 1999, Professor S.L. Wong, acting at the behest of the Vice-Chancellor, conveyed a message to Dr. Chung on 29th January, 1999 which was calculated to inhibit his right to academic freedom. A majority of the Panel is further satisfied that Professor S.L. Wong, again acting at the behest of the Vice-Chancellor, on 1st November, 1999 conveyed a similarly calculated message to Dr. Chung. One member of the Panel is satisfied that such a message was conveyed but is satisfied only on a balance of probabilities that this was done at the behest of the Vice-Chancellor.

The report, however, did not reach a conclusion on whether Tung exerted pressure on academic freedom.

=== Reaction ===
Soon after the report was revealed, Lo, Cheng, and Wong all rejected the accusations by the Panel and declined to resign. But the latter two, under immense pressure from the public, students and alumnus, and all seven deans of the university, tendered their resignations on 6 September, the day when the Council met to discuss the Panel's report. The two officials continued to reject the findings of the investigation, but decided to avoid damage to the institution. Wong said he fervently hopes that "this sad saga would come to an end, that the bleeding would stop, and that the healing process for our University would begin".

Cheng asserted that his "conscience is clear", but expressed regret for his "lack of sensitivity" and not handling the situation more astutely. Cheng added the university community suffered in recent weeks and he thus assumed full moral responsibility.

Although I deeply regret not being able to complete the work and reforms that I have begun at the University which you have all been working so hard to bring about, I feel that it is in the best interests of the University that I resign. The Incident has left the University open to unrelenting media attention and public scrutiny. It has polarized the University community. The issue has become so contentious that it threatens to harm HKU seriously, especially relationships between colleagues. I feel that it is necessary to step aside in order to make it easier for the HKU community to begin the process of healing and reconciliation.

Andrew Lo, in response to the finding through his legal representative, said he "strongly objects to and does not accept the adverse findings made by the Panel against him", and rejected the report for "unsupported by the evidence; unnecessary for the Panel to establish its main findings; and outside the Panel's Terms of Reference". Reserving all his legal rights in the, Lo urged the council to expressly decline to endorse the report. Praised by Tung as "an honest man", Lo remained in office despite growing pressure, until his resignation in 2001 to serve in Tung's family business Orient Overseas (International).

Before the Council sitting commenced, Sir Ti-liang Yang, chairman of the council, had a meeting with Tung for 15 minutes. Tung, also the Chancellor of the HKU, expressed concern and hoped the council would "handle the matter better" The Council eventually only "noted" the report but did not vote to endorse, wishing the scandal would come to an end and repair the university's reputation, and further vetoed any further actions on the Pollgate.

The enquiry concluded just days before the legislative election, which was seen as a threat to the pro-government parties. BBC said "the whole affair has tarnished the image of Hong Kong's government and may lead to significant support for opposition candidates in Sunday's election". CNN commented "[an] appearance of collusion in the scandals among Hong Kong's government, business, politicians and academics has fueled public cynicism about Hong Kong politics, which could translate into lower voter turnout", referring to the Pollgate and the admission by Cheng Kai-nam, vice-chairman of the main pro-Beijing party DAB, for providing confidential documents to a company run by Hong Kong's richest tycoon Li Ka-shing. Jasper Tsang, DAB chairman, acknowledged the damages to the image of the government by the scandal, and admitted the anticipated electoral suffer.

There were also calls for the new legislature to hold its own inquiry into the opinion poll saga. That proposal, however, was defeated in the legislature by a vote of 19–35 as the pro-government bloc continued to hold its majority.

== See also ==
- Robert Chung
- Hong Kong 818 incident
- University of Hong Kong
- University of Hong Kong pro-vice-chancellor selection controversy
