= Gloria Chang =

Hong Kong activist (born 1977)

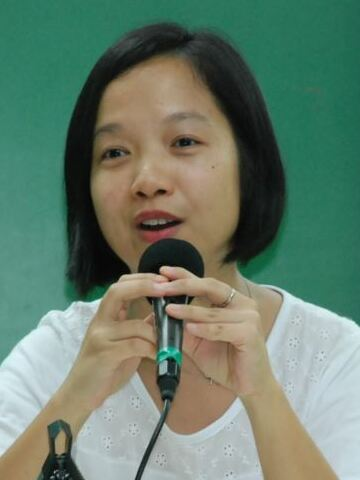
- Chang in 2014

President of the Hong Kong University Students' Union
- In office 2000–2000
- Preceded by: Chan King-chi
- Succeeded by: Bibi Ngai

Personal details
- Born: 1977 (age 48–49)
- Education: St. Mary's Canossian College
- Alma mater: University of Hong Kong (BSocSc)

Gloria Chang
- Traditional Chinese: 張韻琪
- Simplified Chinese: 张韵琪
Transcriptions
Standard Mandarin
- Hanyu Pinyin: Zhāng Yùnqí
Yue: Cantonese
- Jyutping: zoeng1 wan6 kei4

Gloria Chang Wan-ki (Chinese: 張韻琪; born 1977) is a Hong Kong environmental activist who served as president of the Hong Kong University Students' Union in 2000. She was a main critic of the university leaders during the "Pollgate" controversy concerning government pressure on Robert Chung Ting-yiu, who conducted polls.

She was a major contributor to the resignation of the former Vice Chancellor of The University of Hong Kong (HKU) Professor Cheng Yiu-chung. Chang was arrested for "illegal assembly" while protesting university fees in 2000. As of February 2007, she was working at Greenpeace Hong Kong as a climate and energy campaigner. In 2011, she travelled to the North Pole as part of her work with Greenpeace. She is also a Roman Catholic.

Chang, along with HKU politics professor Joseph Chan were the middlemen in coordinating the televised debate between protest leaders and government officials amid the 2014 Umbrella Movement. She opposed the confrontational, non-cooperative approach of radical protesters and called for dialogue and compromise on both sides.
