= Hong Kong Public Opinion Research Institute =

Social Science Research Institute in Hong Kong

Hong Kong Public Opinion Research Institute 香港民意研究所
- Industry: Polling Organisation
- Predecessor: Public Opinion Programme of the University of Hong Kong
- Founded: July 1, 2019; 6 years ago in Hong Kong
- Founder: Dr Robert Chung
- Area served: Hong Kong
- Key people: Dr Robert Chung; Chung Kim-wah
- Website: www.pori.hk

The Hong Kong Public Opinion Research Institute (Chinese: 香港民意研究所, abbrev. HKPORI) is an independent polling organisation in Hong Kong. It conducts public opinion surveys on a regular basis and was officially registered as a limited company on 19 February 2019. It symoblically started its operations on 4 May of the same year and officially on 1 July. The institute is the successor of the Public Opinion Programme of the University of Hong Kong.

The current chairman and CEO of the institute is retired Assistant Professor Dr Robert Chung of the University of Hong Kong, who had been the director of the institute's predecessor.

== History ==
The predecessor of the institute is the Public Opinion Programme of the University of Hong Kong. It was set up in June 1991 as a self-funding unit by Dr Robert Chung under the Faculty of Social Sciences in the University of Hong Kong. Its purpose was to "collect and study public opinion on topics which could be of interest to academics, journalists, policy-makers, and the general public"., which the institute continues in fulfilling.

The programme broke off from the university on 1 July 2019, which all of its staff transferred over to the new institute as all previously existing contracts were honoured, with most choosing to stay with the institute when their contract ended. This decision was made partly due to Dr Chung's impending retirement.

== Arrest of current and former key members ==
In December 2024, the National Security Department released a warrant for the institute's former Deputy CEO Chung Kim-wah, for "inciting secession and colluding with foreign forces".

In January 2025, the CEO of the institute Robert Chung was taken away by the police under suspicion of "using his own company to render assistance to a wanted person who has absconded overseas, in continuing activities endangering national security in Hong Kong". The institute's office was also searched by the police. In February 2025, the institute announced that it would end all self-funded research and would transform or potentially close down, and welcomed interested parties to take it over or negotiate a purchase of it.
