= St. Mary's Canossian College =

Secondary school in Hong Kong

Coordinates: 22.30306°N 114.1763°E

St. Mary's Canossian College (SMCC)
- 162 Austin Road, Tsim Sha Tsui, Kowloon, Hong Kong

Information
- Type: Grant, secondary
- Motto: Cor Unum et Via Una (in Latin) (One Heart and One Way)
- Denomination: Catholicism
- Established: 1900; 126 years ago
- School district: Yau Tsim Mong
- Chairperson: Sr. Veronica Fok
- Principal: Ms. Janet Wong
- Forms: Form 1 to Form 6
- Gender: Girls
- Area: Approx.10,000m^{2}
- Website: http://www.smcc.hk

St. Mary's Canossian College
- Traditional Chinese: 嘉諾撒聖瑪利書院
- Simplified Chinese: 嘉诺撒圣玛利书院
- Literal meaning: Canossian St. Mary College
Transcriptions
Standard Mandarin
- Hanyu Pinyin: Jiānuòsā Shèng Mǎ Lì Shūyuàn
Yue: Cantonese
- Jyutping: gaa1 nok6 saat3 sing3 maa5 lei6 syu1 jyun6*2

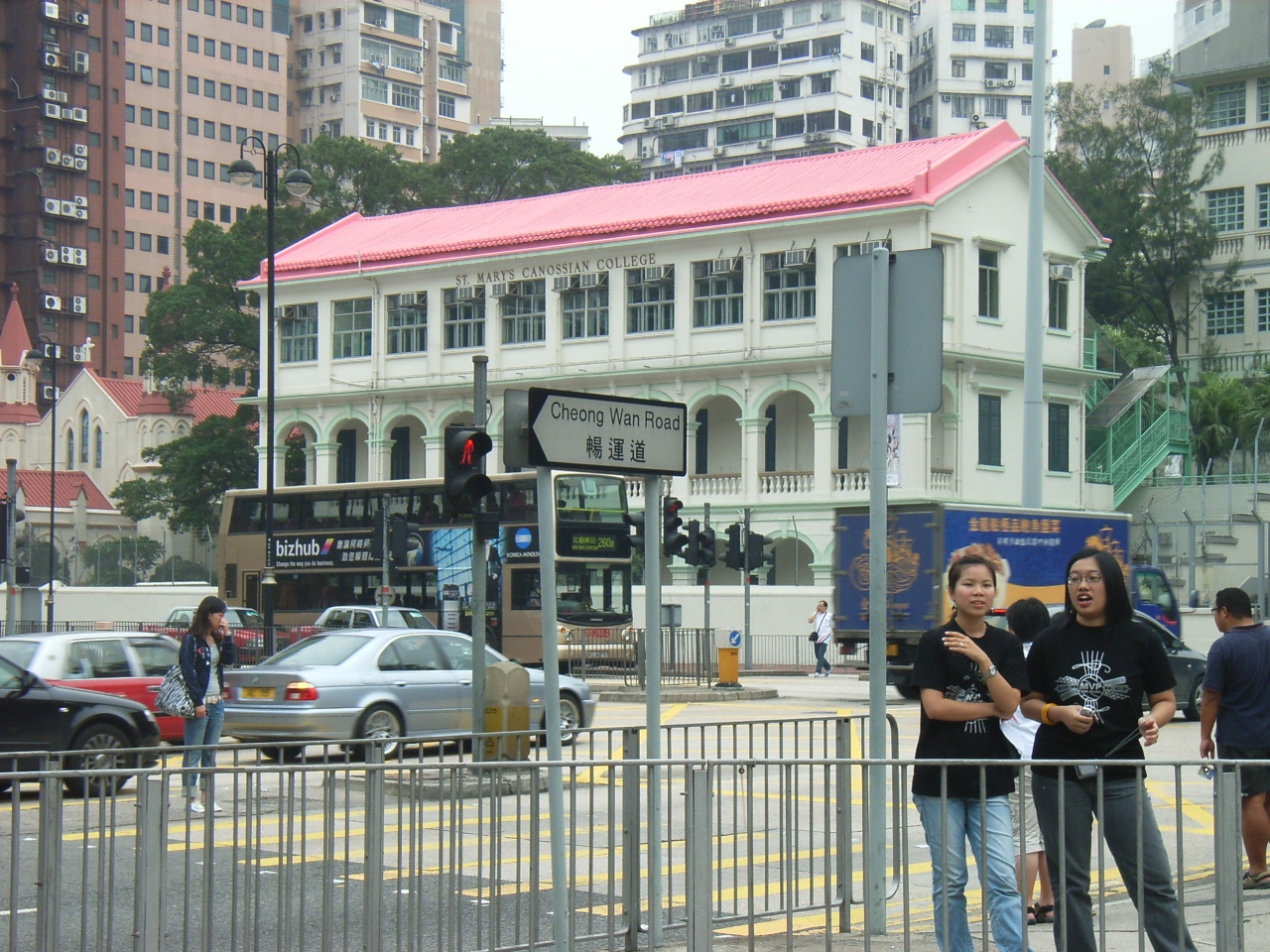
The school building near Chatham Road, Tsim Sha Tsui

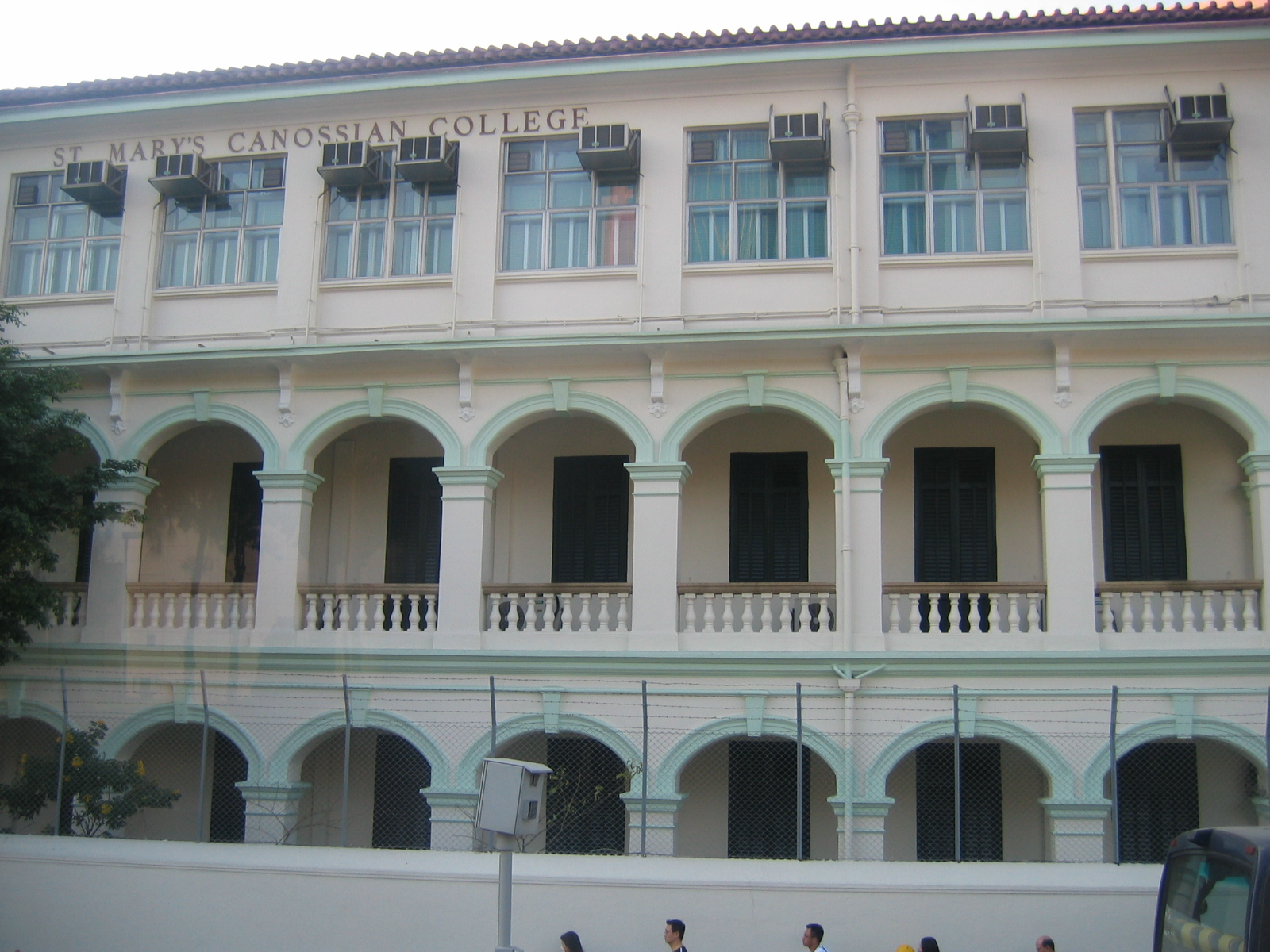
St. Mary's Canossian College

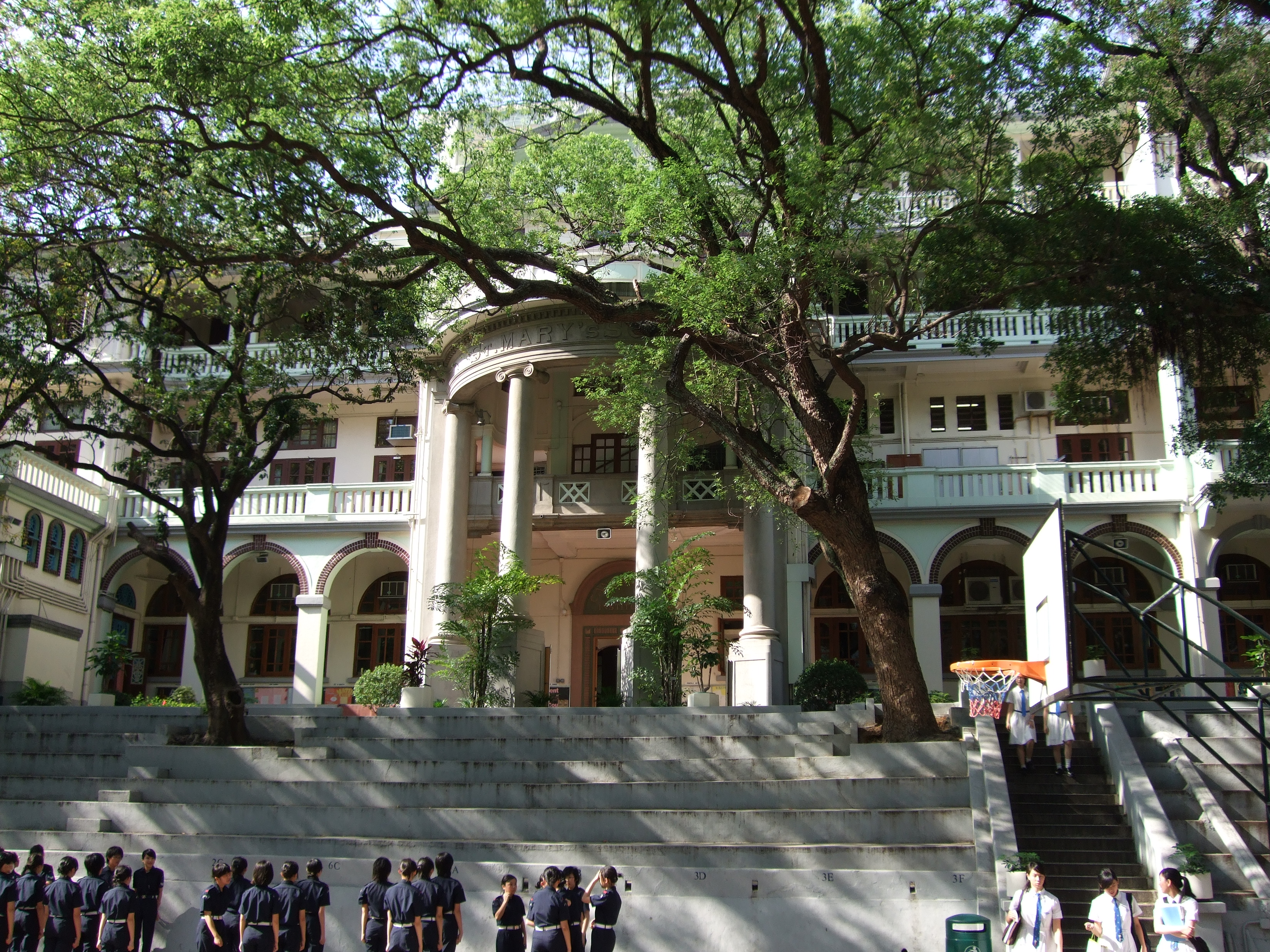
Main Building of St. Mary's Canossian College

St. Mary's Canossian College (Chinese: 嘉諾撒聖瑪利書院) is a Catholic girls secondary school in Tsim Sha Tsui, Kowloon, Hong Kong. The school was founded in 1900, and is situated at the junction of Austin Road and Chatham Road South.

The school, known as St Mary's School in the past, was originally aimed at educating the Portuguese girls living in Kowloon, Hong Kong. In 2010, the school's main building and St. Michael Building were both confirmed to be Grade I historic buildings in Hong Kong. Other Catholic buildings, like the Rosary Church and the St. Mary's Canossian School, are adjacent to the school.

== School history ==
St. Mary's Canossian College was founded in 1900 by the Institute of the Canossian Daughters of Charity, a Catholic religious institute founded by Magdalene of Canossa of the ancient noble family of Verona, Italy, who was canonised on 2 October 1988 for her sanctity.

The school started with only two classrooms for boys and girls in response to the need for a school in Tsim Sha Tsui, Kowloon. The small school admitted 30 pupils and was named St. Mary's School. The school developed rapidly as the population in Kowloon grew. In 1960 the enrolment was 2500 including the Primary Section. In the same year the Secondary Section was named "St. Mary's Canossian College", a grant-in-aid school for girls while the Primary Section was renamed "St. Mary's Canossian School".

== Exam results ==
Admission to the college is highly competitive. The school has produced 2 perfect scorers "10As" in the history of Hong Kong Certificate of Education Examination (HKCEE) and 5 "Top Scorers" and "Super Top Scorers" in the history of Hong Kong Diploma of Secondary Education Examination (HKDSE).

7 x 5** "Top Scorers" are candidates who obtained perfect scores of 5** in each of the four core subjects and three electives.

8 x 5** "Super Top Scorers" are candidates who obtained seven Level 5** in four core subjects and three electives, and an additional Level 5** in the Mathematics Extended (M1/M2) module.

== Notable alumni ==
- Teresa Cheng (politician), Secretary for Justice
- Nancy Ip, President of the Hong Kong University of Science and Technology
- Fanny Law, Permanent Secretary for Education and Manpower
- Maggie Cheung Ho-yee, actress
- Sonija Kwok, actress
- Natalie Wong, actress
- Mandy Cho, actress
- Kearen Pang, director
- Gloria Chang, activist
- Adrienne Lau, singer

== Sources ==
- School Homepage
- Primary School Homepage
