= Public Opinion Programme of the University of Hong Kong =

Former Social Science Research Institute in Hong Kong

The Public Opinion Programme of the University of Hong Kong (Chinese: 香港大學民意研究計劃, abbrev. HKUPOP) was a self-funding programme existed under the Faculty of Social Sciences in the University of Hong Kong. It was set up in June 1991 by Dr Robert Chung. Its purpose was to "collect and study public opinion on topics which could be of interest to academics, journalists, policy-makers, and the general public". It ceased existing as a programme in the University and was succeeded by the Hong Kong Public Opinion Research Institute in July 2019.

== History ==
It was established in June 1991 by Dr Robert Chung and operated as a self-funding unit, with fundings from outside sources. The programme was later briefly transferred to the Journalism and Media Studies Centre in the university in May 2000 and transferred back to the Faculty of Social Sciences in January 2002. The programme published over 60 polls per year and charted the popularity of the government, chief executive and senior government officials. Over 1,500 independent surveys and other kinds of research were conducted during its existence.

On 23 April 2019, it was announced that the programme would cease to exist under the university with its work being continued as a new private and independent organisation as the Hong Kong Public Opinion Research Institute, with effect taking from 1 July of the same year. This decision was made partly due to Dr Chung's impending retirement. Research and staff contracts continued to be honoured, with the choice of returning to the university or staying in the institute being offered to upon the expiration of the contract.

== Scandals ==
The programme was involved in the Robert Chung Affair in 2000, a political scandal which Dr Chung had spoken out on the programme being pressured by the then chief executive and university's chancellor Tung Chee-hwa through the university's vice-chancellor and pro-vice-chancellor from publishing the approval rates of the government, leading to an investigation panel being set up by the university. The vice-chancellor and pro-vice-chancellor resigned after the allegations were found to be true by the panel.

== Similar Associations ==
- Hong Kong Institute of Asia-Pacific Studies (The Chinese University of Hong Kong)
- Hong Kong Transition Project (Hong Kong Baptist University)
