= Rosary Church =

Coordinates: 22.3026°N 114.1764°E

- 玫瑰堂
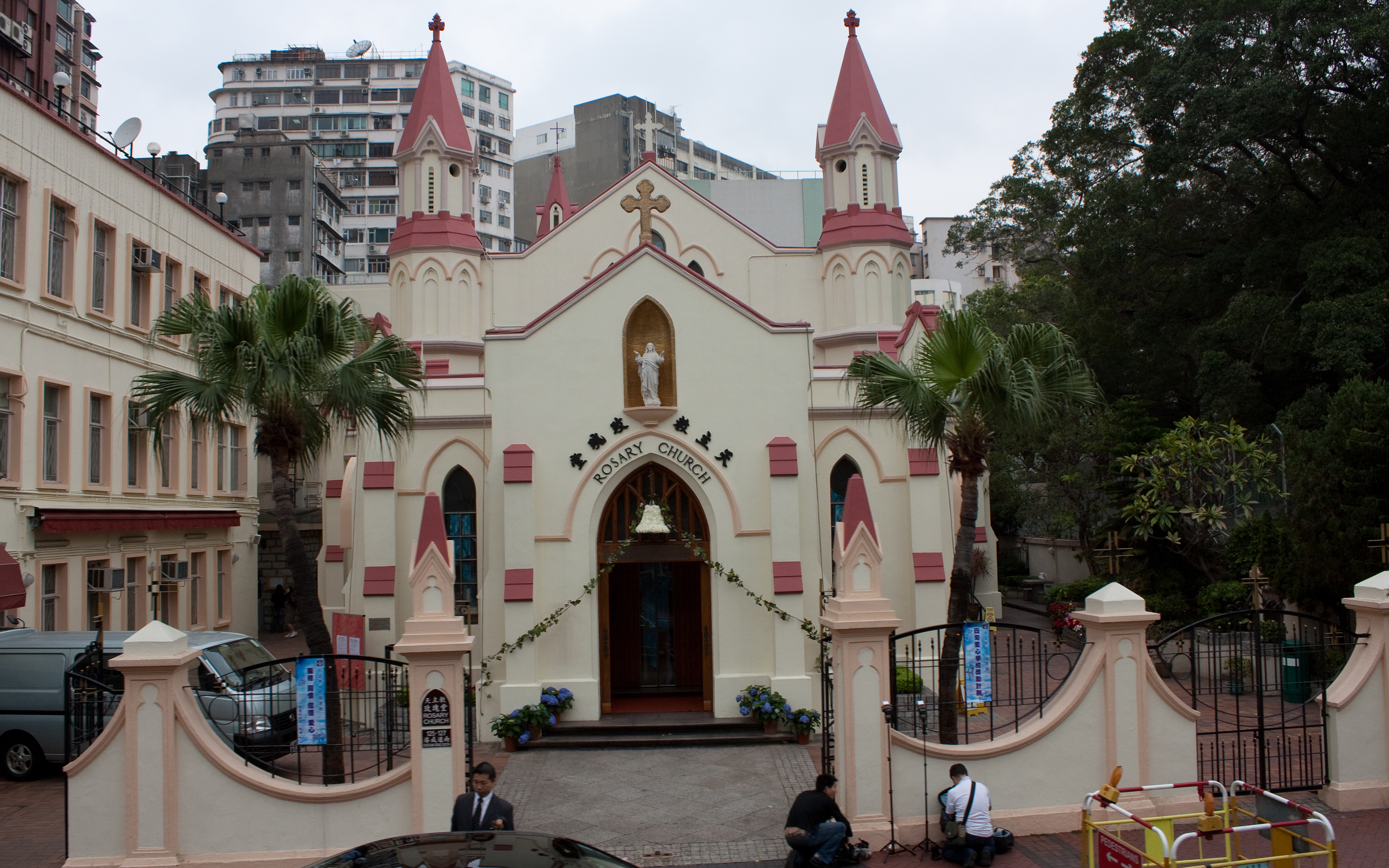
- Rosary Church, Chatham Road South, Hong Kong
- Rosary Church
- Website: rosarychurch.catholic.org.hk

History
- Status: Parish Church
- Founded: 10 December 1904
- Dedication: Our Lady of Pompeii
- Consecrated: 23 May 1905

Architecture
- Architectural type: Gothic

Administration
- Diocese: Hong Kong

Clergy
- Bishop: Stephen Chow
- Priest: Mario E. Gutierrez Carrejo

Rosary Church
- Traditional Chinese: 玫瑰堂
Transcriptions
Standard Mandarin
- Hanyu Pinyin: Méi guī táng
Yue: Cantonese
- Yale Romanization: Mùih gwai tòhng
- Jyutping: Mui4 gwai3 tong4

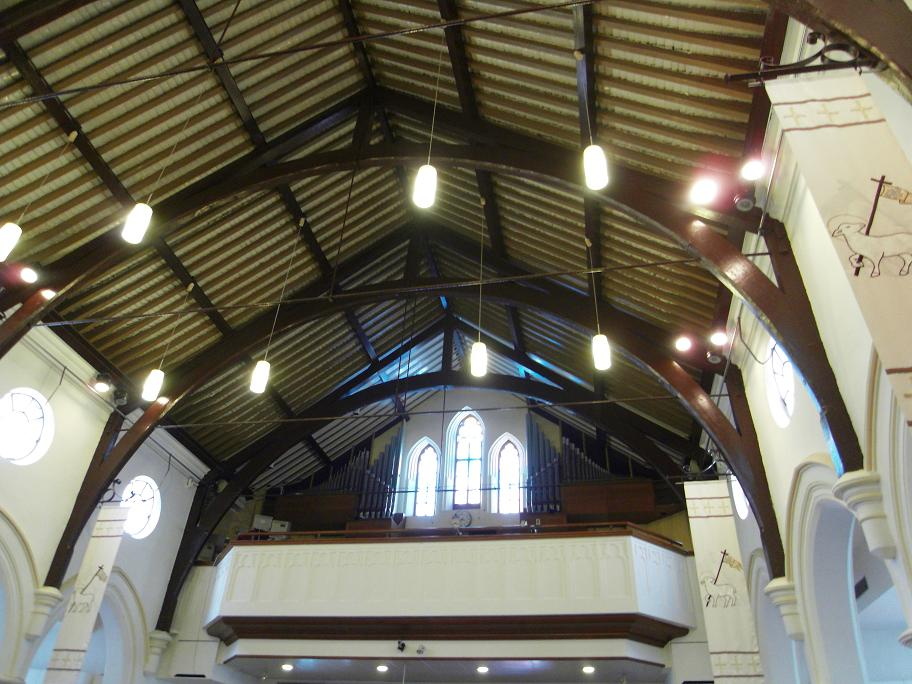
The ceiling of Rosary Church

Rosary Church is located at 125 Chatham Road South, Tsim Sha Tsui, Kowloon, Hong Kong. It is the oldest Catholic church in Kowloon. The church is in Gothic style; the original plan was based on a Roman Basilican model. The church, St. Mary's Canossian College and St. Mary's Canossian School in adjacent belongs to same building cluster.

It was classified as Grade II Historic Building in 1990 and it has been a Grade I Historic Building since 2010.

== History ==
In 1900, because of the Boxer Rebellion in China, some Indian battalions in the British army were stationed in Kowloon; there were about 200 Catholics in the brigade. At the same time, there was an increasing number of Catholics among the civil population.

A donation of $20,000 was made in 1903 by Dr. Anthony Gomes, a Portuguese Catholic. so that the church could be built. The foundation stone was laid solemnly by Fr. De Maria, Pro-Vicar Apostolic of Hong Kong on 10 December 1904.

The church was designed by Palmer and Turner, and its construction church was completed in 1905, for the population of Catholics was increasing even after the British troops had left.

On 23 May 1905, the completed church was consecrated to Our Lady of Pompeii, Queen of the Most Holy Rosary; according to the intention of Dr A S Gomes, the benefactor, in loving memory of his parents and brother.

During the Second World War, the Church remained untouched by the Japanese army and still could continue its religious services. At that time, the Church was led by the Italian Parish Priest, Horace De Angelis.

== Pastoral Team ==
Position	Name	Diocese / Religious Order
Parish Priest	Rev. Fr. Mario E. Gutierrez Carrejo	Guadalupe Missionaries
Assistant Parish Priest	Rev. Fr. Michael J. Sloboda	Maryknoll Society
Assistant Parish Priest	Rev. Fr. Cyril Cheung Lok Tin	Diocese of Hong Kong
Permanent Deacon	Rev. Deacon Thomas Lam	Diocese of Hong Kong
