= Paul Yip Kwok-wah =

Hong Kong business executive

Paul Yip Kwok-wah (Chinese: 葉國華) is the founder and chairman of the Hong Kong Policy Research Institute, chairman of the B & P Foundation, honorary professor of Xi'an Jiaotong University, honorary professor of Graduate School of Chinese Academy of Social Sciences, as well as honorary professor of Shandong Youth University of Political Science.

In addition, Yip serves as the board chairman of Hong Kong Chinese Culture Development Association Limited, member of the Election Committee of the National People's Congress of the Hong Kong Special Administrative Region of the People's Republic of China.

In the 1980s, Yip participated in the specialized research related to Hong Kong's return to China organised by Hong Kong and Macau Affairs Office, and was later appointed as the Hong Kong Advisor of Central People's Government and Member of Preparatory Committee as well as Selection Committee of Hong Kong Special Administrative Region. Between July 1, 1997, and June 30, 2002, he served as Special Advisor to the Chief Executive of Hong Kong Special Administrative Region, specializing in political liaison with Taiwan and various sectors of Hong Kong. Yip also served the Hong Kong Basic Law Foundation as chairman up to December 2017.

With regards to private businesses, Yip is the chairman of B & P Holdings Limited, China Education Development (Invest & Mgt) Co. Ltd., Yew Wah International Education Foundation, Yew Wah Education Management Company Limited, and Hong Kong Renful Group, as well as the board director of Yew Chung Education Foundation in Hong Kong and a member, of the Board of Governors of Yew Chung College of Early Childhood Education.
