= Hong Kong University Students' Union =

Undergraduate student association

The Hong Kong University Students' Union
- Motto: Unity with Independence
- Institution: University of Hong Kong
- Location: None
- Established: 16 October 1912
- Abolished: 13 July 2021
- President: Vacant
- Members: 16,979 (as of 2021)
- Website: hkusu.org at the Wayback Machine (archived 2018-03-28)

Hong Kong University Students' Union
- Traditional Chinese: 香港大學學生會
- Simplified Chinese: 香港大学学生会
- Jyutping: hoeng^{1} gong^{2} daai^{6} hok^{6} hok^{6} saang^{1} wui^{6*2}
Transcriptions
Standard Mandarin
- Hanyu Pinyin: Xiānggǎng Dàxué Xuéshenghuì
Yue: Cantonese
- Yale Romanization: heung^{1} gong^{2} daai^{6} hok^{6} hok^{6} saang^{1} wui^{6}
- Jyutping: hoeng^{1} gong^{2} daai^{6} hok^{6} hok^{6} saang^{1} wui^{6*2}

The Hong Kong University Students' Union (HKUSU; 香港大學學生會) was a student union founded in 1912 and registered under the Societies Ordinance in Hong Kong. It was the officially recognised undergraduate student representative body of the University of Hong Kong until 13 July 2021 after the union's council passed a motion in memorial to a deceased assailant who attacked and severely stabbed a police officer on the street.

== History ==
The Union was established on 16 October 1912, when it was first named as the Hong Kong University Union, one month after the commencement of the first academic session and some two years after the foundation of the University of Hong Kong.

After the Second World War in 1945, the Hong Kong University Students' Society was formed on 13 November 1946 to "pave the way for the eventual resuscitation of the Union". The Union was then revived in 1947. Two years later in 1949, the Union submitted a successful application for becoming a student organisation to the Hong Kong Police, independent from the operation of the University.

=== Motion of police assailant ===
On 7 July 2021, the Council of the Union passed a motion to "[express] its deep sadness at the death of Mr Leung Kin-fai; [offer] its sympathy and condolences to his family and friends; [appreciate] his sacrifice to Hong Kong". The individual mentioned in the motion assaulted a police officer with a knife and then killed himself immediately in Causeway Bay on 1 July 2021, during the 24th anniversary of the handover of Hong Kong. The motion was condemned by the university administrators. The then-chairman of the HKU council, Arthur Li, considered the expulsion of the involved student union council members. On 9 July, members of the student union council publicly retracted the motion and apologised, with all union executive committee members resigned.

Despite the apology and resignation, a chain of aftermath followed. On 13 July, the university issued a statement strongly condemned the act of "blatantly whitewashing violence" and has ceased recognising the role provided by the union on campus and their representation for the member students, subsequently ceased collecting membership fees from the students on behalf of the union. The "Democracy Wall", a public bulletin on campus managed by the union, had all propaganda materials swiftly taken down. On 15 July, the university demanded the union office to be vacated from the Composite Building on campus within 7 days. As Arthur Li had previously expressed his willingness to have the union committee members be investigated for their possible violation of the national security law, the union office was raided by the national security police on 17 July. All Union Council members were on the watch list and told they be intercepted should they attempt to leave Hong Kong. Four members of the Union Council were also arrested and charged of advocating terrorism under the national security law in August, they were later granted bail.

Following this incident, other universities also turned against their respective student unions. Lingnan University, Chinese University of Hong Kong, Polytechnic University, and City University all followed suit and stopped collecting membership fees on behalf of their respective students' unions.

== General ==
The Union served both undergraduate and postgraduate students and was the only official student organisation serving the undergraduates of the University of Hong Kong. Undergraduates became Union members automatically. Other students of the University had the opportunity of becoming a Union member upon the payment of membership fee.

According to its Constitution, the aims of the Union were:

- To promote the welfare of the student body
- To act as a bridge between the student body and the University authority in furthering the interests of the students and the University as a whole
- To identify the student body with social issues in the interests of the people of Hong Kong
- To represent the student body both tensely and internationally

== Structure ==
The highest authority of the Union were the General Meeting (GM) and General Polling (GP). The quorum for both the General Meeting or General Polling was 10% of the full members prior to the union's dissolution. The General Meeting was hardly ever called, mostly due to the difficulty in finding venues to accommodate the large number of members at the meeting. General Pollings were held almost every year.

There were 122 student societies affiliated to HKUSU prior to the dissolution These students' societies and clubs were categorised into six main groups: Campus media, Faculty and academic societies, Hall students' association, Sports clubs (forming the Sports Association, HKUSU), Cultural clubs (forming the Cultural Association, HKUSU) and Independent clubs (forming the Independent Clubs Association, HKUSU). These societies are now associated with the university's Co-Curricular Support Office instead following the union's dissolution.

=== Union Council ===
The second highest authority and highest standing authority of the Union was the Union Council. Its functions were to represent the students of the University in such matters as affect their interests and to afford a recognized means of communication between the general body of the students and the University authorities.

Elected at the first meeting in every session, the Council Chairperson was the presiding member of the Union Council. The Chairperson had to be a Union Councillor of the past session to be elected Chairperson of the current session; if the Chairperson was also a Union Councillor of the current session, the Chairperson had to resign from the original representation and the seat would be substituted if necessary. When any member was in the Chair, the member could not move, second or vote on motions.

Also elected at the first meeting in every session, the Honorary Secretary headed the Union Council Secretariat. There were no specific requirements for seeking to be elected Honorary Secretary, but if the person, same as the Chairperson, was a Union Councillor of the current session, the person would have had to resign from the original representation and the seat would be substituted if seen necessary. The Honorary Secretary had the full right to speak, but could not move, second or vote on motions.

=== Union executives ===
An Executive Committee, elected in the way of General Polling, acted as the executive body for HKUSU.

The Union Executives were the forefront members representing HKUSU. The Committee comprised 17 members formulating Union policies and carrying out resolutions of the General Meeting and General Polling. The Committee also carried out the daily administrative work of the Union.

The composition was as follow prior to the union's dissolution:

- President
- Vice-President (Internal)
- Vice-President (External)
- General Secretary
- Financial Secretary
- University Affairs Secretary (two seats)
- External Affairs Secretary (two seats)
- Student Welfare Secretary
- Publications and Publicity Secretary
- Social Secretary
- Current Affairs Secretary
- Administrative Secretary
- President of the Sports Association (ex officio)
- President of the Cultural Association (ex officio)
- President of the Independent Clubs Association (ex officio)

== Welfare and internal affairs ==
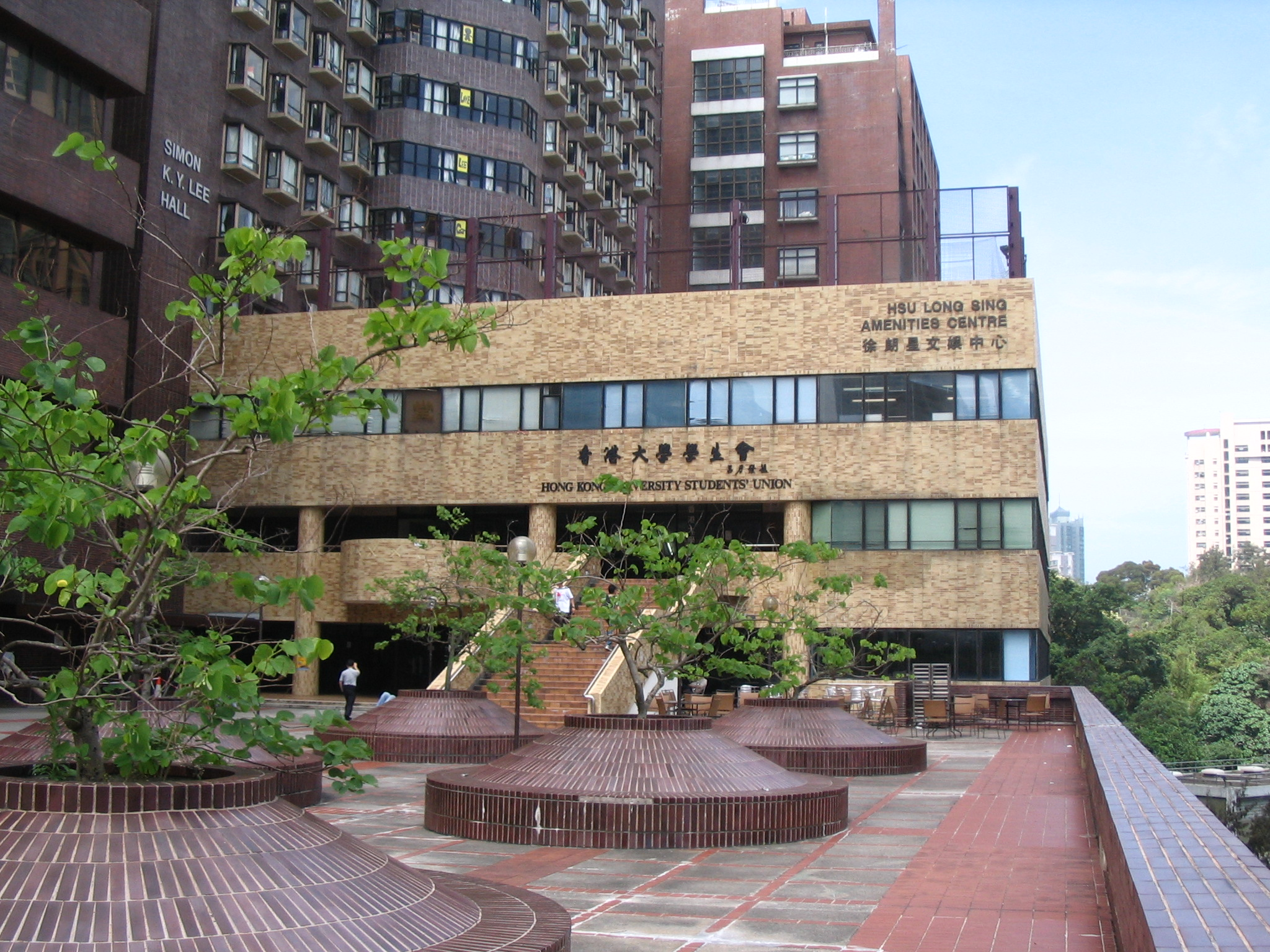
The Students' Union Building before its revamp in 2011

HKUSU student activities and service outlets prior to its dissolution included:

Outlet Name	Services offered	Location
The Union Office	Room, poster, banner sites booking services	Level UG1, Union Building, HKU
The Student Co-operative Store (Co-op Store)	Discounted stationery and souvenirs	Level UG1, Union Building, HKU
Computer Hardware and Accessory Store	Computer Hardware, Accessories, Software, banner and poster printing	G/F, Union Building, HKU
Self-serviced Photocopying Centre	Octopus Card-operated Photocopying Machines, mobile phone charging	Level UG1, Union Building, HKU
HKUSU Photocopying Store	Discounted photocopying	Level UG1, Union Building, HKU

== University affairs ==
The Union acted as a channel between students and the University. Some of its projects prior to its dissolution included:

Project	Theme
3-3-4 University Curriculum Reform	Curriculum, General Education, Study Load of Professional Subjects (e.g. Engineering, Accounting, Law, etc.), Grading / GPA / Honours Classification System
Centennial Campus	Relocation of Faculties and the Students' Union, Usage of the Main Building, etc.

== External affairs ==
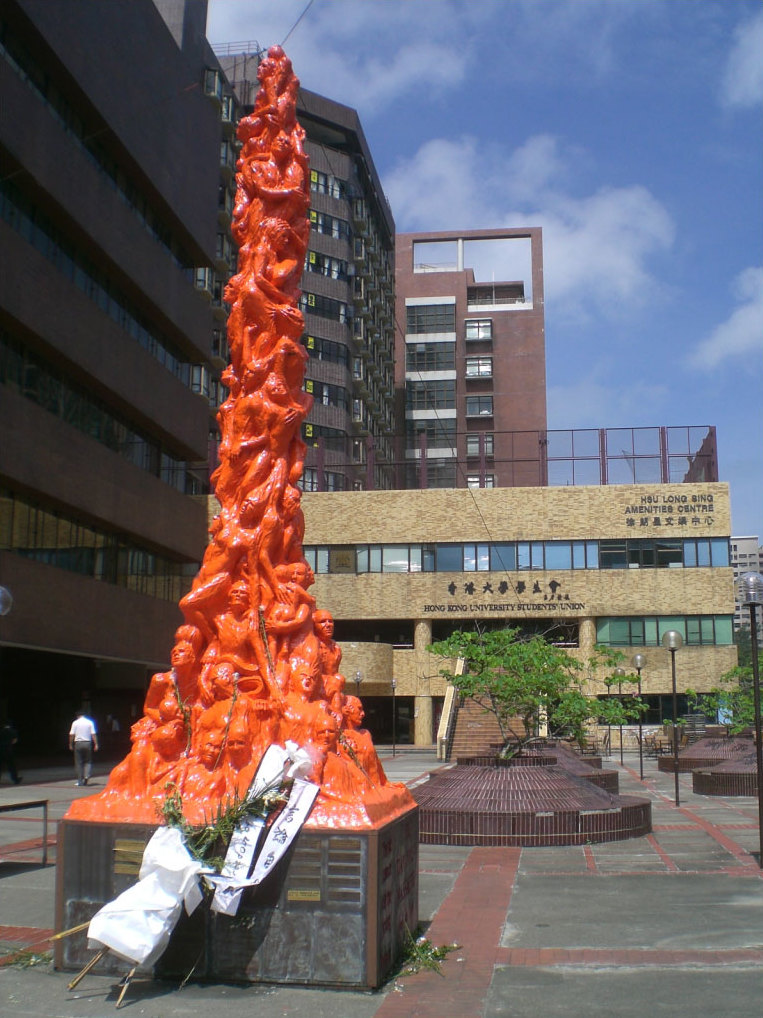
Pillar of Shame in front of the Students' Union Building prior to its demolition in 2011

HKUSU, as one of the students' unions of the universities in Hong Kong, had been very active in current affairs and student movements.

In 1998, the General Polling of the Union adopted that the Pillar of Shame (國殤之柱) should stay in the University campus permanently. This marked the beginning of a permanent stance that the Chinese Communist Party should be held responsible for the June Fourth massacre in Tiananmen Square in Beijing in 1989. Later in 2009, another General Polling passed stated that the Central People's Government of China should rehabilitate the June Fourth Massacre, and be held responsible for the deaths and casualties during the incident.

In November 2016, students' unions across all major Hong Kong universities, including HKUSU, invited Christopher Patten, former Hong Kong governor, to be the guest of honour in a lecture that held at Loke Yew Hall in the University of Hong Kong.

== New union building ==
As part of the construction of the Centennial Campus, the Hsü Long Sing Amenities Centre, where the HKUSU had resided for a number of years, was demolished in 2011. Development of a new Students' Union Building was completed in September 2011. With the Faculty of Arts, Faculty of Law, and Faculty of Social Sciences being relocated to the west of the University campus, the new Students' Union Building became the heart of the University, where a majority of student activities took place.

== Union choir ==
The Hong Kong University Students' Union Choir was founded in 1967 and has won a number of student awards since its foundation.

== Union song ==
The Hong Kong University Students' Union had a union song titled The Hong Kong University Students' Union Song. It was sung in both English and Chinese. The two lyrics are however not translations of each other.

== List of union presidents ==
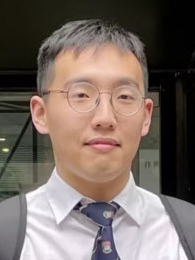
Charles Kwok (in 2023), 2021 President

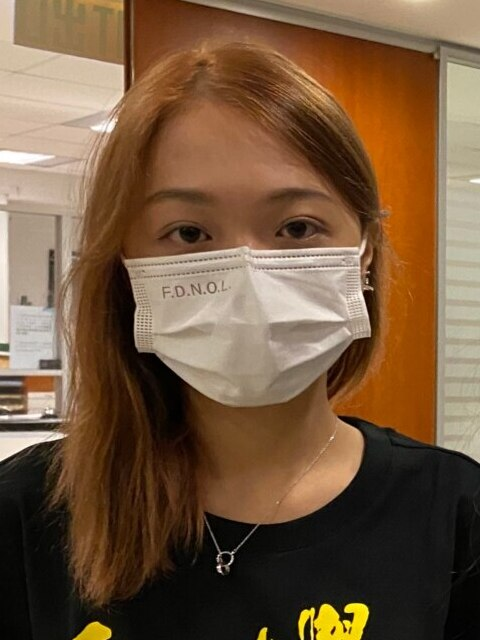
Edy Jeh (in 2021), 2020 President

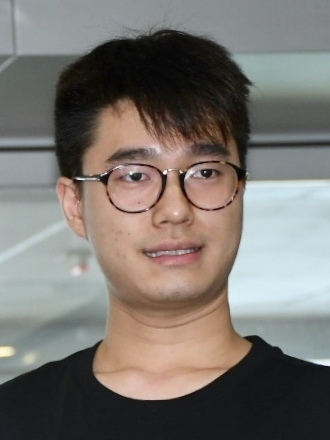
Davin Wong (in 2019), 2018 President

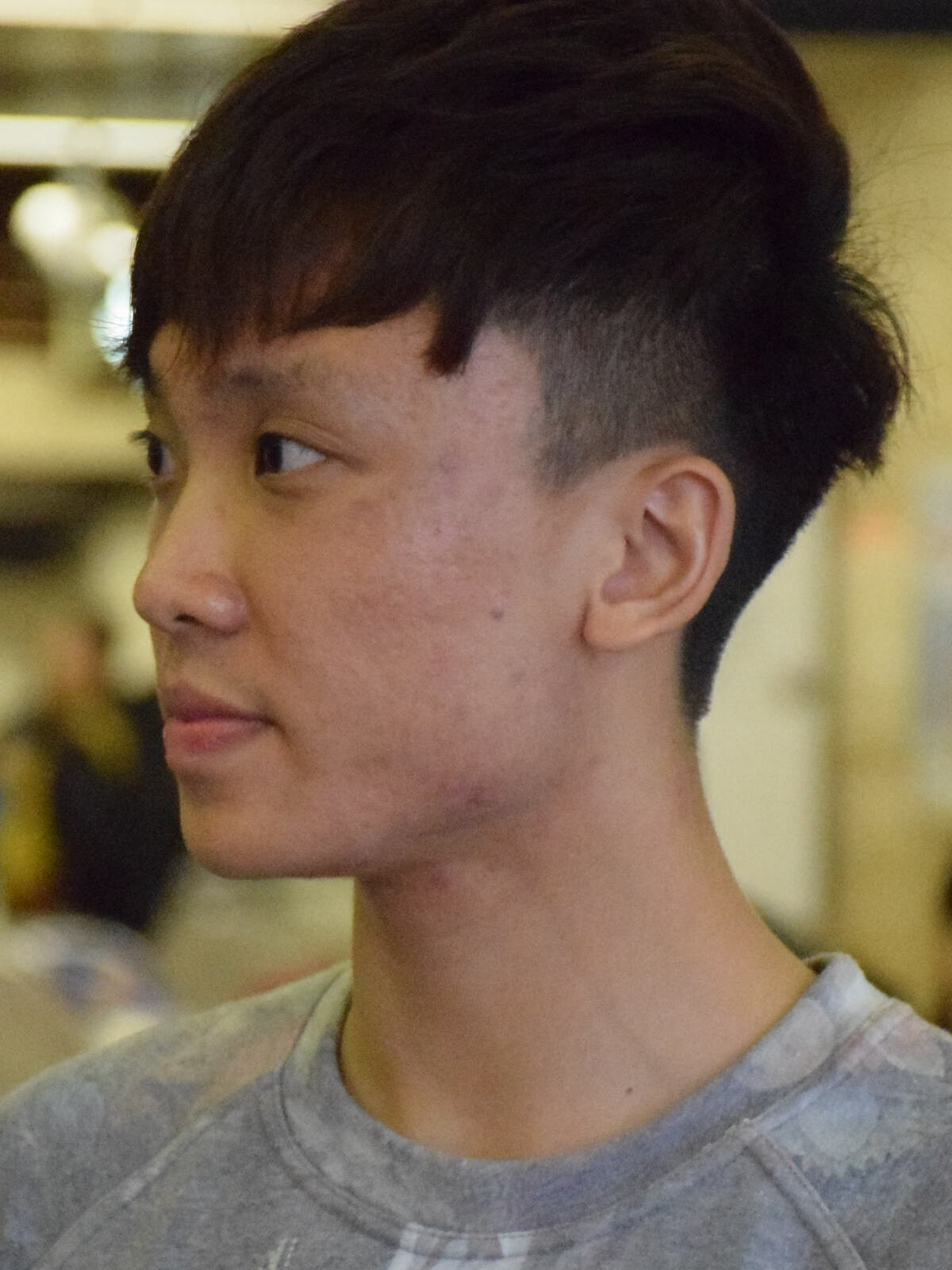
Wong Ching-tak (in 2017), 2017 President

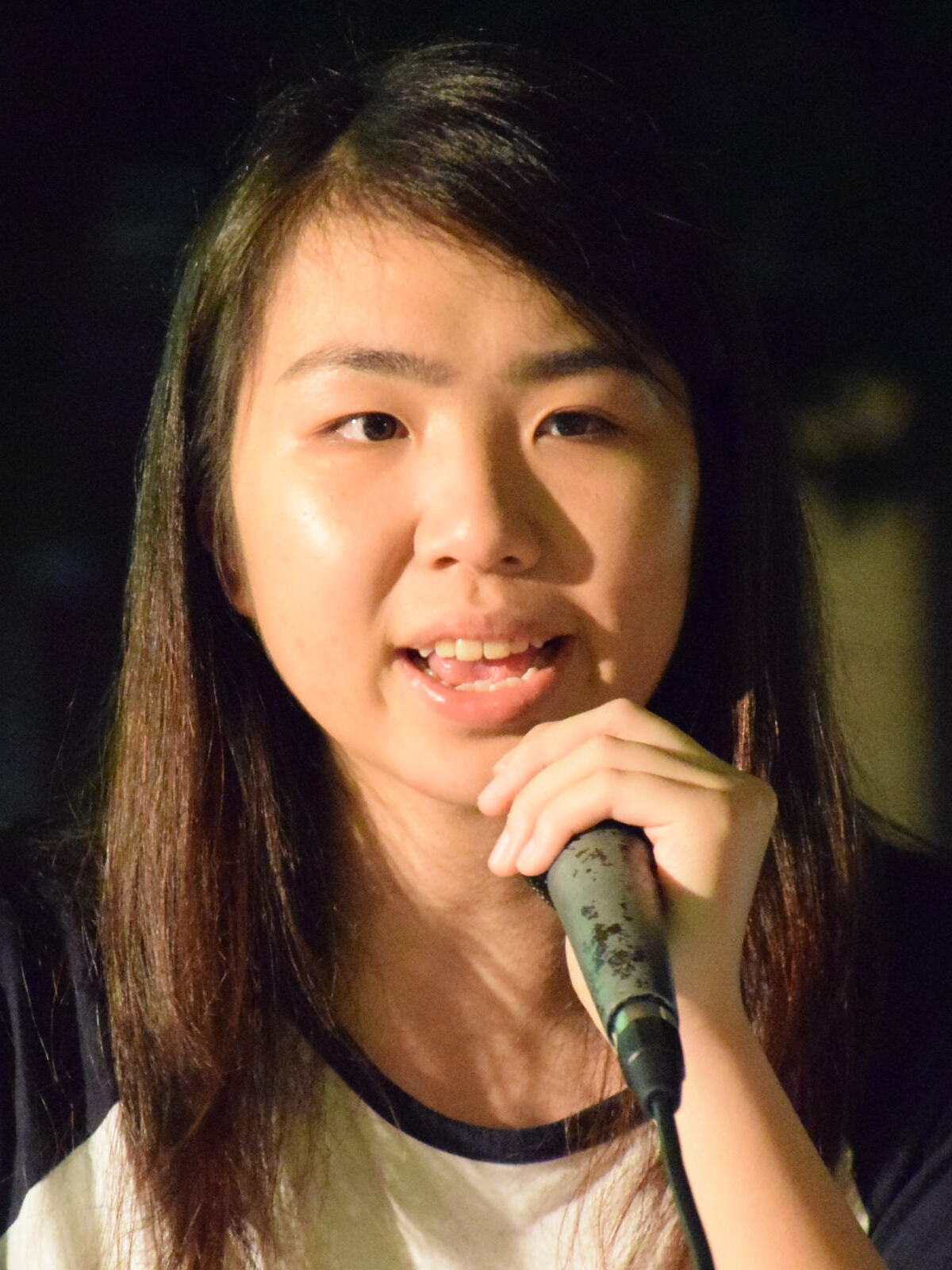
Althea Suen (in 2016), 2016 President

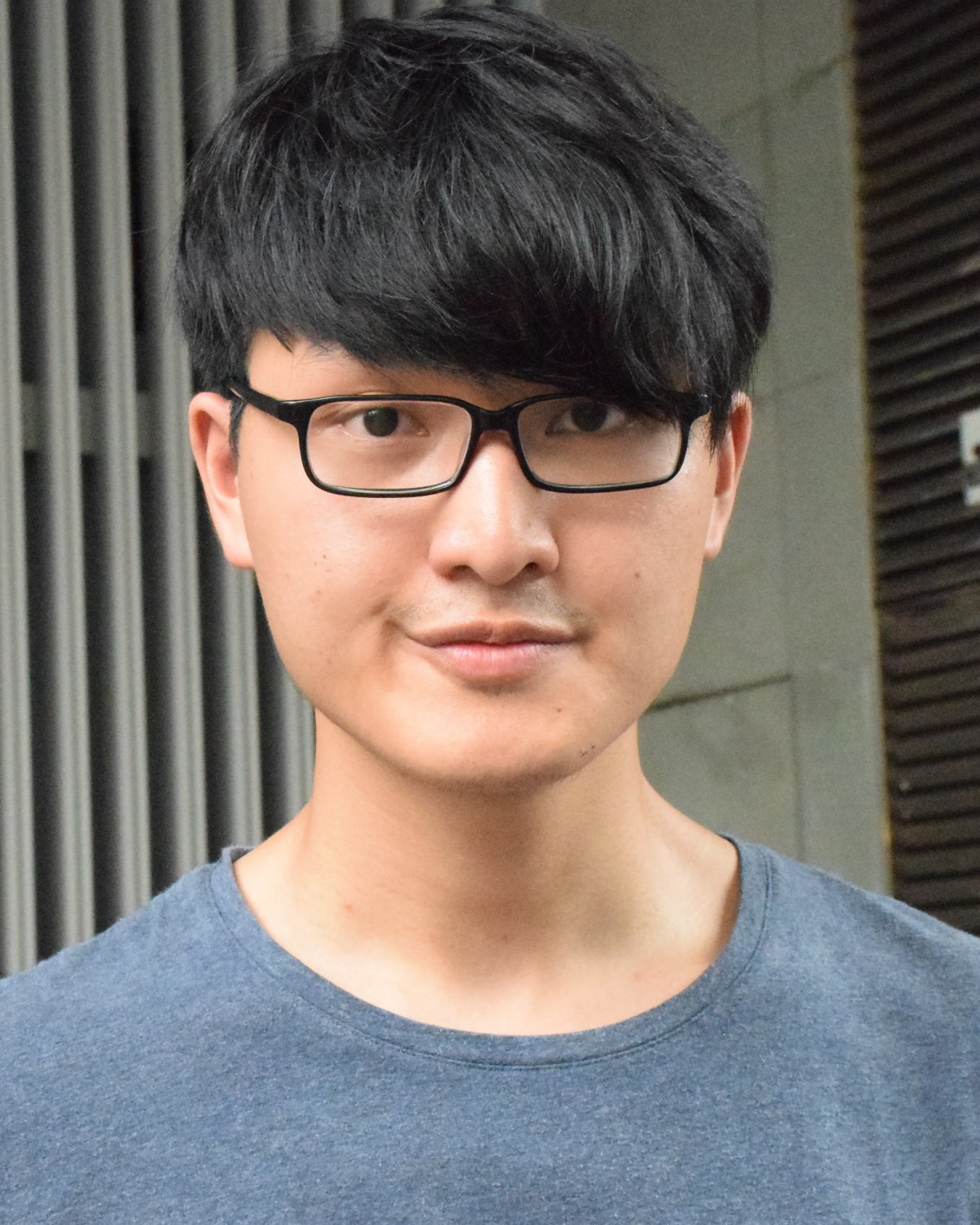
Billy Fung (in 2015), 2015 President

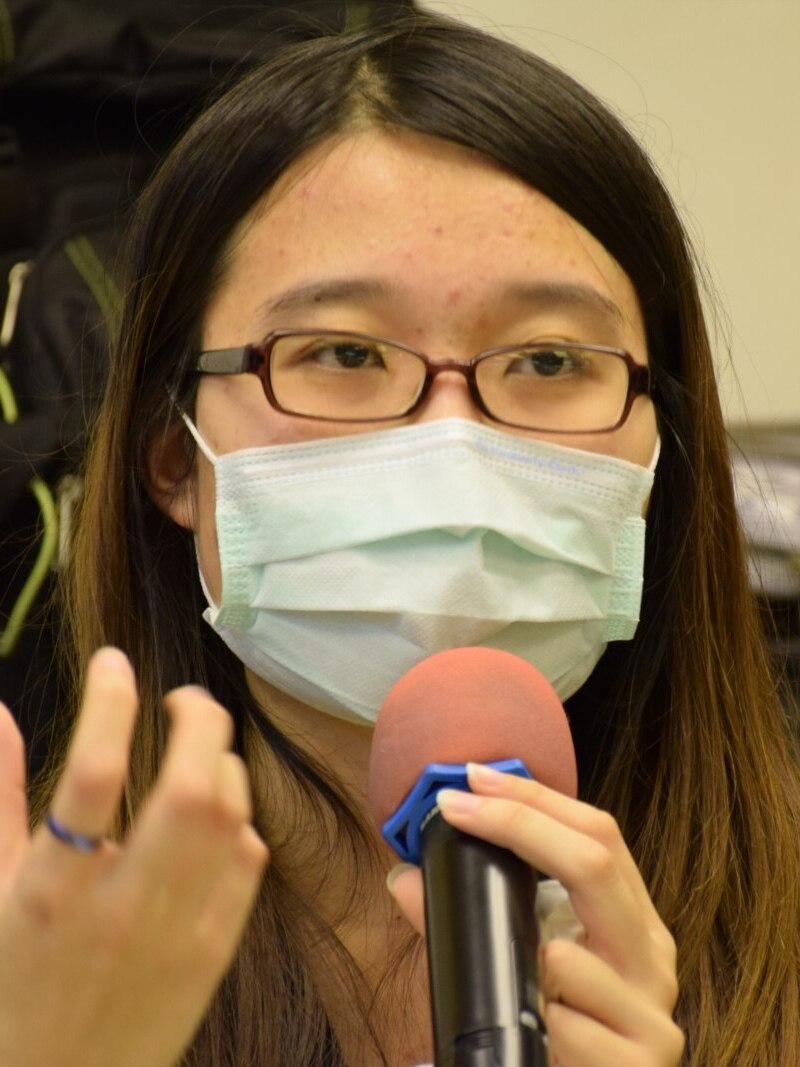
Yvonne Leung (in 2015), 2014 President

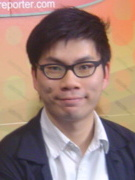
Steven Kwok (in 2010), 2008 President, later Labour Party chairman

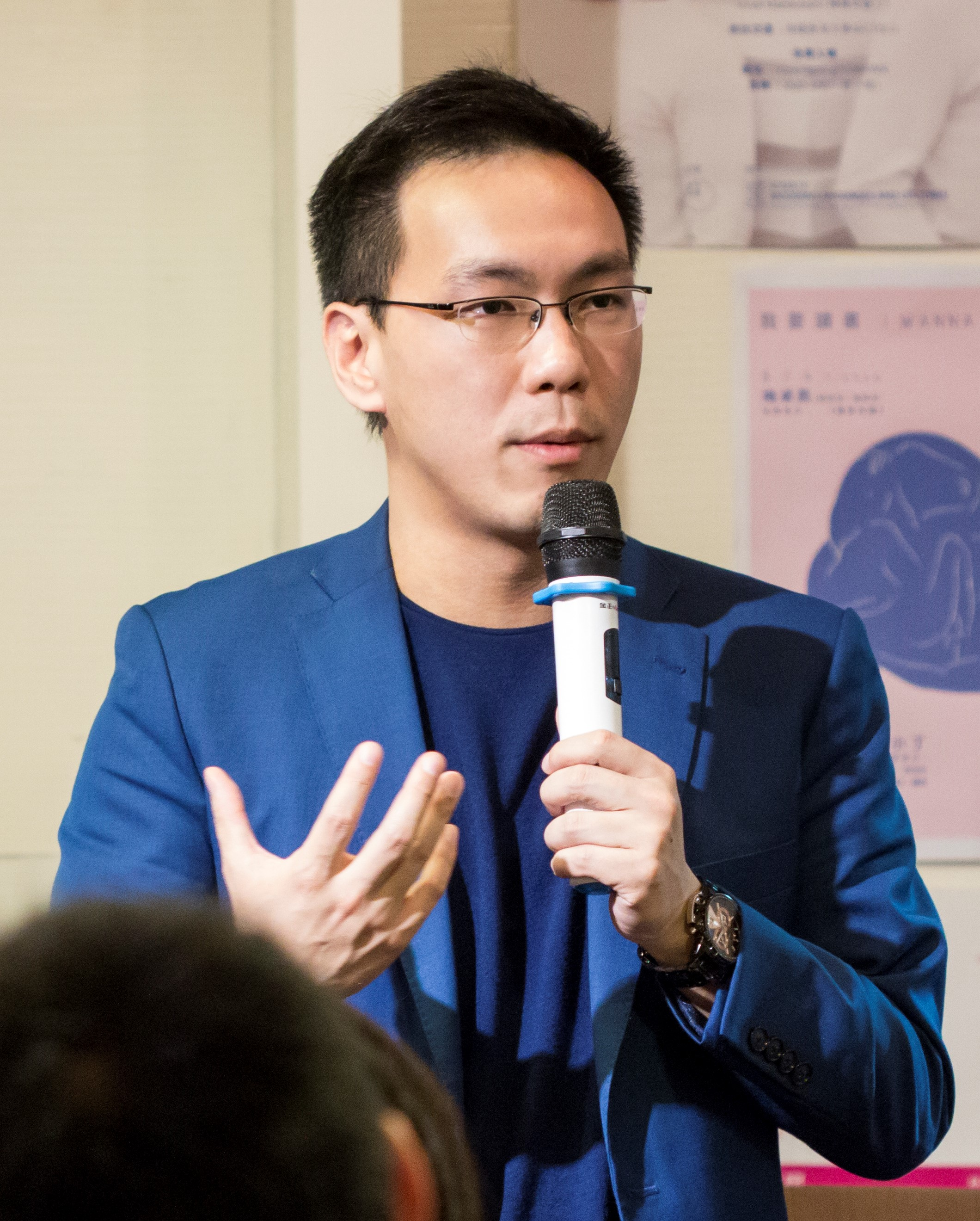
Raymond Mak (in 2017), 2003 President

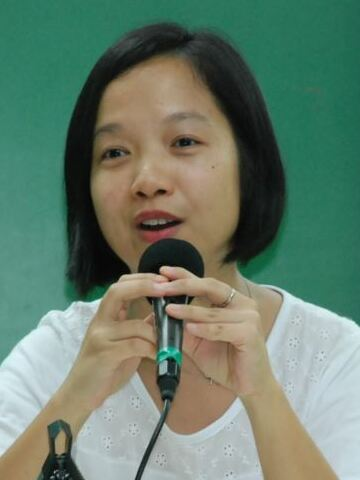
Gloria Chang (in 2014), 2000 President

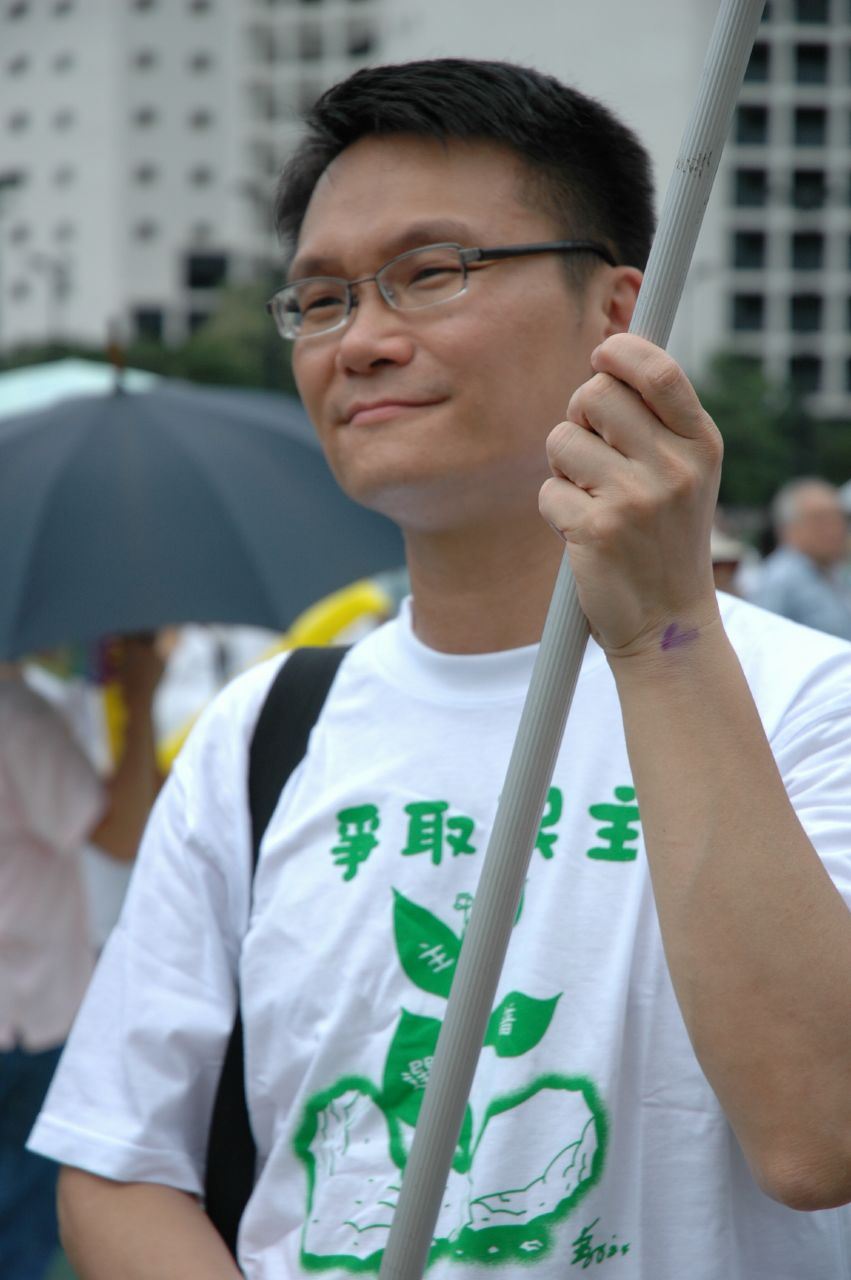
Andrew Fung (in 2005), 1984 President, later Information Coordinator of Chief Executive Office

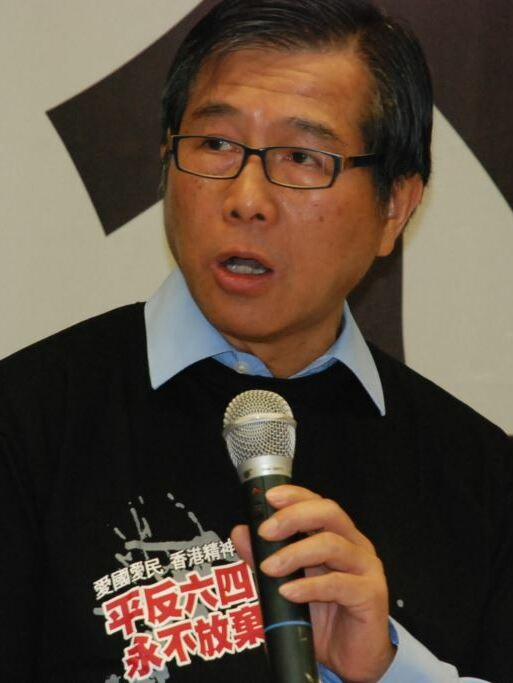
Mak Hoi-wah (in 2013), 1975 President, later Hong Kong Alliance vice-chairman

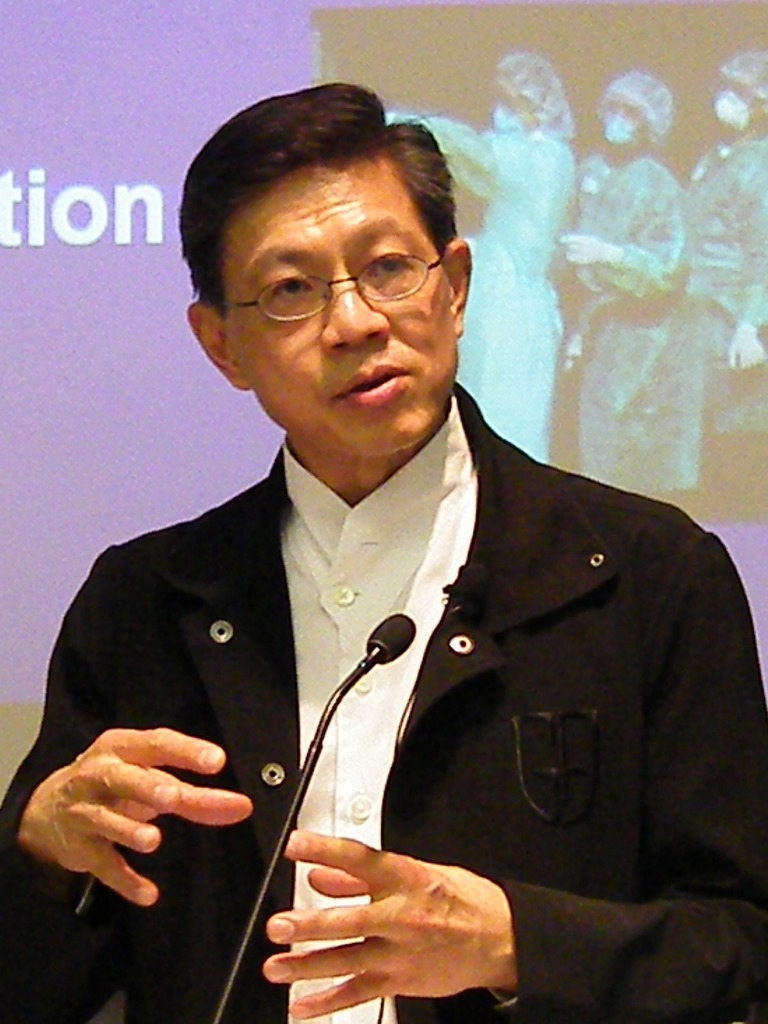
Yeoh Eng-kiong (in 2008), 1969 President, later Health Secretary

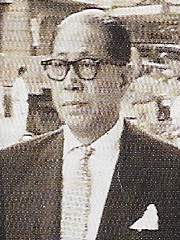
Lo Hin-shing (in c. 1960), 1915 Chairman, later served as a magistrate

In the early days of the Union, the student leaders were elected to the chairmanship of the Union Council, while the Chancellor of the university, also the Governor of Hong Kong, was the ex-officio President of the Union. Vice Presidents were "well-known gentlemen" in the city, such as donors of the Union. In 1926, the Union adopted amendments to the constitution which made the Chancellor as ex-officio Patron of the Union, while the union leader became known as President instead of Chairman, in line with English universities' practices.

List of union leaders
Session	President		Notes
2021	Charles Kwok Wing-ho	郭永皓	Resigned
2020	Edy Jeh Tsz-lam	葉芷琳	
2019			
2019	Davin Kenneth Wong	黃程鋒	Acting, resigned
2018	Davin Kenneth Wong	黃程鋒	
2017	Wong Ching-tak	黃政鍀	
2016	Althea Suen Hiu-nam	孫曉嵐	
2015	Billy Fung Jing-en	馮敬恩	
2014	Yvonne Leung Lai-kwok	梁麗幗	
2013	Laurence Tang Yat-long	鄧日朗	
2012	Dan Chan Koon-hong	陳冠康	
2011	Li Tsz-shu	李子樹	
2010	Vacant		
2009	Chan Yi-ngok	陳一諤	Ousted
2008	Steven Kwok Wing-kin	郭永健	
2007	Wan Hon-san	尹翰紳	
2006		劉方	
2005		陳啟業	
2004		陳子堅	
2003	Raymond Mak Ka-chun	麥嘉晉	
2002	Vacant		
2001	Bibi Ngai Wing-yin	魏詠賢	
2000	Gloria Chang Wan-ki	張韻琪	
1999	Chan King-chi	陳敬慈	
1998	Tang Chui-chung	鄧徐中	
1997	Patrick Wong Chun-sing	王振星	
1996	Vacant		
1995	Rosa Mok Pui-han	莫佩嫻	
1994	Tang King-loy	鄧敬來	
1993	Vacant		
1992	Fong Tak-ho	方德豪	
1991	Cheung Yui-fai	張銳輝	
1990	Yau Chun-ming	邱振明	
1989	Chow Wing-hang	周永恆	
1988		蕭偉達?	
1987	Mak Tung-wing	麥東榮	
1986	Yuen Yiu-ching	袁耀清	
1985	Li Siu-kei	李紹基	
1984	Andrew Fung Wai-kwong	馮煒光	
1983	Liu Chun-wah	廖振華	
1982	Chang Ka-mun	張家敏	
1981	Chow Kar-po	仇家寶	
1980	Victor Fung Yip-hing	馮業興	
1979	Alan Man Hoi-leung	文海亮	
1978	Yeung Wai-ling	楊威寧	
1977	Henry Lo Hon-yiu	盧漢耀	
1976	Chung Chi-wai	鍾子維	
1975	Mak Hoi-wah	麥海華	
1974	Linda Tsui Yee-wan	崔綺雲	
1973	David Chan Yuk-cheung	陳毓祥	
1972	Joseph Luk Man-keung	陸文強	
1971	Lawrence Fung Siu-por	馮紹波	
1970	Sidney Chow Chi-keung	周志強	
1970	John Ng Tung-wah	伍董華	Resigned
1969	John Tsui Pui-lun	徐佩倫	Elected 22 October
1969	John Lau Shek-yau	劉石佑	Resigned
1968	David William Faure	科大衛	Elected 18 June
1968	Yeoh Eng-kiong	楊永強	Resigned
1967	Tsim Tak-lung	詹德隆	
1966	Yung Yue-hung	翁裕雄	
1965	Albert Lim Heng-poh	林興波	
1964	Stephen Louie Wai-ying	雷惠英	
1963	Chan Charn-sing	陳燦升	
1962	Pan Soo-yeng		
1961	James Chan Chiu-ming		
1956		曹紹釗	
1947	William Ng Jit-thye		Elected 1 October
1947			Committee of the Students' Society
1946	R. Robertson		University staff Founders of the Students' Society
1946	George Beer Endacott	顏德固	University staff Founders of the Students' Society
1946	Bernard Mellor	梅樂彬	University staff Founders of the Students' Society
University suspended due to Japanese occupation
1941	Lim Meng-sai		
1940	Hui Kwan-lun		
1939?	See Chuan-jin		
1937	Lee Ching-iu		
1936	Yeung Wai-wah		
1935	Ong Ewe-hin		
1934	Tan Wee-han		
1933	Lam Kow-cheong		
1932			
1931	Loke Kam-thong		
1930	Chung Hok-nam		(Note: Or Chung Hok-nang)
1927	Ong Chong-keng		
1926	Ng Bow-poo		
Chairman became President
1925	C. Z. M. Ma		
1924	B. C. Lee		
1923	Edward Hotung	何世儉	
1921	T. L. Cheah		
1920?	Tang?		
1920?	Cheah Toon-siew?		
1919	Wong Fook-han		
1915	Lo Hin-shing	羅顯勝	
1914	Fung Man-sui		
1913	A. S. Tuxford		
1912	T. H. Matthewman?		
1912	F. Clarke		

== See also ==
- HKU pro-vice-chancellor selection controversy
- University of Hong Kong
- Pillar of Shame
