= Robert Chung =

Hong Kong academic (born 1957)

- Traditional Chinese: 鍾庭耀
- Simplified Chinese: 钟庭耀
Transcriptions
Standard Mandarin
- Hanyu Pinyin: Zhōng Tíngyào
Yue: Cantonese
- Jyutping: Zung1 Ting4-jiu6

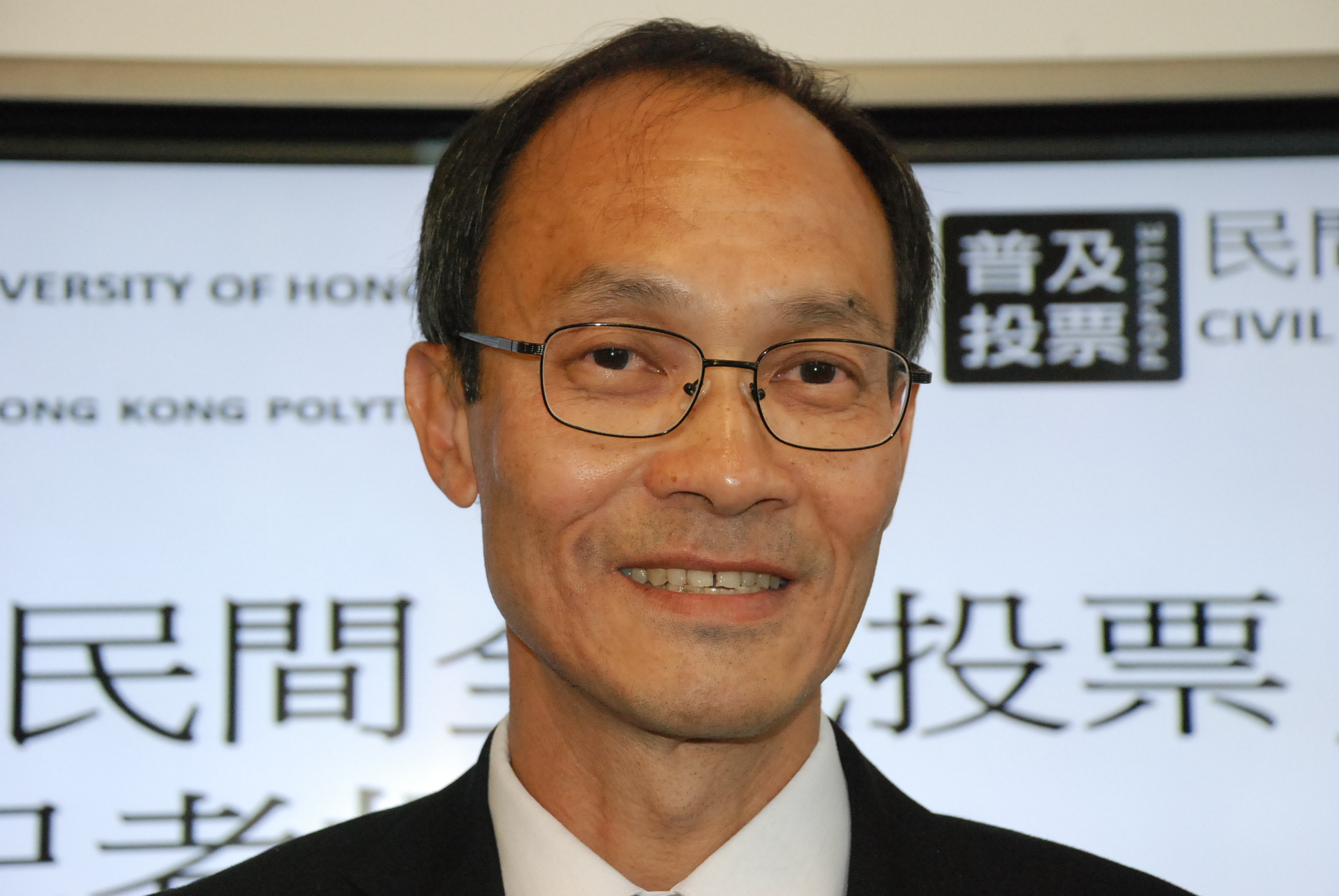
Robert Chung

Robert Chung (Chinese: 鍾庭耀; Jyutping: Zung1 Ting4-jiu6; born 7 September 1957) is a Hong Kong academic. He is president and chief executive officer of the Hong Kong Public Opinion Research Institute, an independent institute since May 2019 and the successor organisation of the Public Opinion Programme of the University of Hong Kong (POP), of which he was long-time head.

In 2000, Chung wrote an academic article stating that he felt pressure to stop conducting public opinion research polls. Later known as the 'Robert Chung affair', his article showed that freedom of speech was still alive in Hong Kong.

== Education and career ==
Chung graduated from Diocesan Boys' School. He obtained his bachelor's degree, Master of Philosophy in Sociology and PhD Degree from The University of Hong Kong. His fields of research interest include electoral studies, political culture, public opinion, rural politics, mobility studies, media performance, youth culture and tradition in modernity.

He joined the Social Sciences Research Centre of the University of Hong Kong when it was established in 1987. In 1991, he set up the POP within the centre and began to study the development of public opinion in Hong Kong. To match the development of the university, Chung and his POP team was transferred to the Journalism and Media Studies Centre at the university on 1 May 2000, and then back to the Faculty of Social Sciences on 1 January 2002.

The programme regularly conducts independent surveys, covers media development, and launches electoral studies, policy issues, and youth studies. Under his leadership, the programme is famous for being impartial and professional, and is a highly respected public opinion study programme in the region. Its studies are widely covered in mass media and frequently cited in academic publications.

Chung has written numerous articles on public opinion and social surveys published in various journals and periodicals, and is the Chief Editor of the monthly POP newsletter, POP Express, and of the HKU POP Site.

In addition, Chung is a member of the Television Programme Advisory Panel of Radio Television Hong Kong (RTHK) and also of the Television Programme Appreciation Index Research Panel. From 1993 to 1994, Chung served as a part-time community panellist of the Central Policy Unit of the Hong Kong Government. He then became a part-time member of the Central Policy Unit between 1994 and 1999. Between 1997 and 2003, he served as a member of the Community Research Sub-committee of the Citizens Advisory Committee on Community Relations of the Independent Commission Against Corruption (ICAC), and between 1998 and 2003, as a member of the Citizens Advisory Committee on Community Relations.

Internationally, he has been the Hong Kong representative at the World Association for Public Opinion Research (WAPOR) for a number of years. From 2006 to 2008, Chung was the elected Secretary-Treasurer of WAPOR. He was elected as WAPOR president for 2023–2024. He is also a member of the editorial board of the International Journal of Public Opinion Research.

=== Pollgate ===
In the summer of 2000, he sparked a controversy over the alleged government interference in his Public Opinion Programme. He alleged that he had received political pressure from Chief Executive of Hong Kong Tung Chee-hwa through Vice-Chancellor Cheng Yiu-chung and Pro-Vice-Chancellor Wong Siu-lun to discontinue his public opinion polls on Tung and his government.

Although the allegations were denied by Tung and HKU, controversy erupted over the question of political interference in academic freedom. HKU set up a three-member panel led by Justice Noel Power to investigate Chung's claims. After 11 days of open hearings in August, the panel concluded that there were what it called "covert attempts" to pressure Chung into discontinuing his polls. The panel concluded that Chung was "an honest witness who was telling the truth in relation to the matters he is complaining about", but "neither Lo [The Chief Executive's Senior Special Assistant] nor the vice chancellor disclosed the full and truthful extent of what was said in [the] meetings". The saga ended with the resignation of the Vice-Chancellor and Pro-Vice-Chancellor of the University of Hong Kong – Cheng Yiu-chung and Wong Siu-lun respectively – just before the University Council met on 9 September to vote on whether or not to accept the panel's report. At the end, Chung's Public Opinion Programme continued to function and went from strength to strength in the years following, becoming arguably Hong Kong's most authoritative source of public opinion information and assessment.
