= Ngai jong =

Hong Kong cultural activity

- Traditional Chinese: 嗌莊
- Simplified Chinese: 嗌庄
- Literal meaning: committee shout
Transcriptions
Standard Mandarin
- Hanyu Pinyin: àizhuāng
Yue: Cantonese
- Yale Romanization: Aai jōng
- Jyutping: aai^{3} zong^{1}
- IPA: [ŋaj˧ tsɔŋ˥]

Ngai jong is a student activity in some universities in Hong Kong. Ngai (嗌) means shout, while jong (莊) refers to the executive committee of a college, department or society under the university's students' union.

== Background ==
Student societies in Hong Kong are typically led by an executive committee (jong), charged with organising student activities, providing welfare to students and representing students in their faculty, department, or college. These committees are typically constituted through elections, which are contested by slates of candidates running on the same platform, known as proposed or nominated cabinets. During the election period, often known as "promotion period", proposed cabinets will campaign for votes, with ngai jong sometimes being part of that process.

When proposed cabinets ngai jong, all members stand together and shout slogans, their full title (known as 'full address"), polling dates or sing songs to promote themselves. They also wear eye-catching costumes in order to stand out from other cabinets. A rule is that students can use only their own voice and body parts – microphones, drums, or loudspeakers are not allowed.

The activity is most common at the City University of Hong Kong and the Hong Kong University of Science and Technology, and can also be found at Lingnan University, Education University and the Chinese University of Hong Kong. It is mostly unheard of at the University of Hong Kong.

== Purpose ==
The purpose of ngai jong is to promote the proposed cabinet. When the whole cabinet stands together and shouts slogans, people will see and listen to what they are doing. Also, their costumes will catch the eyes of pedestrians, including their basic members, so members will know the existence of this proposed cabinet and know when and how to vote.

When the whole cabinet shouts their slogans or full address, teammates will have a sense of belonging, as they are promoting the cabinet together, and teammates are wearing the same costume, which can unite the whole cabinet.

When cabinets ngai jong, they will shout slogans that introduce the cabinet, as well as slogans that include polling dates and venue.

Since ngai jong is a special cultural phenomenon of universities in Hong Kong, proposed cabinets will automatically do this as it is a part of the whole election.

== Advantages ==
=== For cabinet members ===
Through shouting slogans and standing together while wearing the same costume, the whole cabinet will have a sense of belonging. When the team is more united, they can work better together.

Through shouting slogans and standing together publicly, the cabinet will have the chance to promote themselves and catch the attention of the people who walk by. This is the most direct form of promotion in the university since the shouting of slogans will cause noises and people can hear their slogans and get to know them.

When a society has two or more proposed cabinets, they can use "Ngai Jong" as a way to compete, since all cabinets will be at the same area at the same time. By shouting their own slogans, designing eye-catching costumes and designing colorful posters, they can use these peaceful methods to attract the attention of basic members, and the cabinet that shouts more loudly will gain more attention. This peaceful method of competing can prevent body contact.

To the members of proposed cabinets, "Ngai Jong" is unforgettable, since it is a tiring but meaningful thing to do during the promotion period. It requires creativity in designing the slogans and it brings physical challenges as cabinets need to stay overnight outdoors for weeks at the university entrance in order to get a good position that is eye catching.

=== For observers ===
When cabinets shout at the entrance, podium or canteen, the students who walk by will feel refreshed since the cabinets all wear colorful costumes and shout loudly. Also, the posters and mascot of the cabinet will add liveliness to the campus.

"Ngai Jong" is a unique culture of the universities in Hong Kong and this is seldom found in other regions. Foreign and exchange students will have a more fruitful and entertaining university life in Hong Kong. Tourists are attracted by this activity, and people who visit the universities can experience and feel the spirit of competing cabinets.

To non- members of the cabinet, "Ngai Jong" can enhance their sense of belonging to the university. This activity also gives them entertainment in school life since they participate as an audience. "Ngai Jong" also arouses their sense of democracy as they have voting rights in the polling day to support the cabinet they trust.

== Controversies ==
"Ngai jong" activities have frequently been reported to have caused public disturbances due to the level of noise. In February 2011, a professor at HKUST sought $100,000 in compensation from the Students' Union and Student Affairs Office after noise from ngai jong activities earlier that month had been recorded to have exceeded 90 decibels. Students responded by asserting that ngai jong was a valuable team-building activity, and that they hoped to preserve the university's student culture. The university had previously restricted ngai jong activities to two one-hour blocks during lunch hour and in the early evening in response to complaints.

In 2017, a student at HKUST was charged with two counts of assault occasioning actual bodily harm after an ngai jong conflict led to a physical confrontation. The student was given a bind-over order for one year.

The students having lessons in classrooms that are near the places of "Ngai Jong" may not be able to concentrate on their lesson because of the noise. Some people in the common resting areas of the university may be disturbed by the noise given out by "Ngai Jong", as the activity is held everywhere in the university. There are time slots for the activity, which are mainly in the morning, noontime and the afternoon, but people may still be affected by the noise. In many universities, complaints from the residents are received every year during the committee election periods. Because the activity “Ngai Jong” is held at public spaces like the university entrance, corridors or near canteens, the noise may cause disturb to passers- by and the general public near the university or those who are using the university facilities. More and more complaints are received, which affects the university’s image and reputation.

Since students are only allowed to use their own voices and body parts during "Ngai Jong" without the help of microphones or other sound systems, students would have to shout loudly in order to catch attention. The long time of shouting affects their vocal cords, causing voice loss or headaches. Also, as students have to stay outdoors overnight to get a good place for "Ngai Jong", they may lack sleep.

== See also ==
- Education in Hong Kong
- Youth in Hong Kong
