= Hong Kong University of Science and Technology Business School =

Hong Kong business school

School of Business and Management
- 工商管理學院
- Other name: HKUST Business School (香港科大商學院)
- Motto: World Class in Asia
- Established: 1991
- Parent institution: Hong Kong University of Science and Technology
- Dean: Hui Kai Lung
- Faculty: 140
- Undergraduates: 3,400
- Postgraduates: 1,400
- Location: Clear Water Bay, New Territories, Hong Kong; 22.33620°N 114.26556°E
- Colours: Blue
- Website: www.bm.ust.hk

The School of Business and Management is the business school of the Hong Kong University of Science and Technology (HKUST), today considered one of the world's leading business schools in Asia.

Established in 1991 in Hong Kong, it offers undergraduate degrees, full-time MBA, EMBA in partnership with Kellogg School of Management, MSc, PhD, and Executive Education programs. HKUST Business School is also one of the first Asian business schools accredited by both the US-based Association to Advance Collegiate Schools of Business (AACSB International) and the European Quality Improvement System (EQUIS).

This business school is well-known for its emphasis on new technologies; this is due to the diverse range of study tracks it offers, as well as its location near Nanshan in Shenzhen.

It has six academic departments: Accounting, Economics, Finance, Marketing, Management, and Information System, Business Statistics, and Operations Management (ISOM).

== Academic programs ==
=== Undergraduate ===
- BBA (Economics, Finance, General Business Management, Global Business, Information System, Management, Marketing, Operations Management, Professional Accounting)
- BSc (Economics and Finance, Quantitative Finance)
- Joint School/Interdisciplinary Programs – BSc (Biotechnology and Business, Mathematics and Economics, Environmental Management and Technology, Individualized Interdisciplinary Major, Risk Management and Business Intelligence)
- Dual Degree Program – Technology and Management (5 years)
- World Bachelor in Business, in collaboration with the University of Southern California and Bocconi University

=== Master of Business Administration (MBA) ===
- Full-time MBA
- MBA for Professionals (Part-time)
- MBA for Professionals (Bi-Weekly Part-time)
- Digital MBA (DiMBA)

=== Executive MBA ===
- EMBA for Chinese Executives
- Kellogg-HKUST Executive MBA
- HKUST-SKOLKOVO Executive MBA for Eurasia

=== Master of Science ===
- HKUST-NYU Stern MS in Global Finance
- MSc in Accounting
- MSc in Business Analytics
- MSc in Economics
- MSc in Finance
- MSc in Financial Technology
- MSc in Global Operations (HKUST-Yale Double Degree Option)
- MSc in Information Systems Management
- MSc in International Management (CEMS - The Global Alliance in Management Education) (HKUST-Yale & HEC-HKUST Double Degree Options)
- MSc in Investment Management

=== PhD/ MPhil ===
Field of study: Accounting, Economics, Finance, Information Systems, Operations Management, Management and Marketing

=== Non-degree Executive Programs ===
- Open programs
- Company programs

== Rankings ==
=== Kellogg-HKUST Executive MBA Program by Financial Times ===
- Ranking No.1 in the world (2007, 2009–2013, 2016–2018)

=== Full-time MBA Program by Financial Times ===
- Ranking No.1 in Hong Kong (2010-2022, 2024, 2025, 2026) and 15 times in Global top 25 since 2008

=== Full-time MBA Program by Bloombergbusinessweek ===
- Ranking No.1 in Asia Pacific (2023-24) (2024-25)

== Partnership programs ==
Over 130 and 80 partner organizations for undergraduate and postgraduate programs respectively, including leading business schools in Asia, Australasia, Europe and North America.

- Member of the prestigious CEMS network which includes 34 of the world's best business schools
- HKUST-NYU Stern MS in Global Finance with Leonard N. Stern School of Business, New York University
- World Bachelor in Business with University of Southern California and Bocconi University
- HKUST-SKOLKOVO Executive MBA for Eurasia with Moscow School of Management SKOLKOVO

== Academic departments ==
- Accounting
- Economics
- Finance
- Information System, Business Statistics and Operations Management (ISOM)
- Marketing
- Management

== Campuses ==
- HKUST Campus
- Lee Shau Kee Campus
- HKUST Business School Central
- HKUST Business School Beijing

== Research & Education Centers ==
- Center for Business Strategy and Innovation
- Center for Economic Development
- Center for Marketing and Supply Chain Management
- Tanoto Center for Asian Family Business and Entrepreneurship Studies
- Thompson Center for Business Case Studies
- Tongyi Industrial Group Center for E-Commerce
- Center for Investing
- Center for Business Education
- Center for Business Strategy and Innovation
