= Hong Kong Virtual University =

University in China

Hong Kong Virtual University (HKVU, 香港虛擬大學), formerly known as Cyber University, began in 2001 and is a collaborative program funded by the Restructuring and Collaboration Fund of the University Grants Committee. It aims to provide a virtual campus for Hong Kong tertiary institutions and universities. The online courses offered by the HKVU can be taken by students who either study in or will enter these institutions. The courses are jointly provided by the Hong Kong University of Science and Technology, the City University of Hong Kong, the Lingnan University, the Hong Kong Institute of Education, and the University of Hong Kong.

These courses cover four areas: general education, information technology, language, and science and education.

== History ==
The project was initiated by Dr. Pong Ting Chuen (龐鼎全博士), a professor of computer science and the associate vice-president for academic affairs of the Hong Kong University of Science and Technology.

Regarding the low performance and insufficient use of information technology facilities in secondary schools, a pilot study was initiated in fall 2000, in which 28 students from three schools attended one of six cyber classrooms in secondary schools delivered through an eLearning Open Platform (eLOP). In the study, students watched video lectures, asked instructors questions and performed online tasks. Following the pilot study, the project gained funding from the Quality Education Fund (優質教育基金) of Hong Kong.

Since 2001, there have been over 100 schools participating in the project, including the Canadian International School, Diocesan Girls' School, King's College, La Salle College, Marymount School, Pui Ching Middle School, St. Paul's Convent School, Wah Yan College, Hong Kong, and Wah Yan College, Kowloon.

== Programs ==
=== Credit Bearing Program ===
The Credit Bearing Program is a series of courses for undergraduates from local tertiary institutes, secondary school students, and overseas students. Credit units are earned after fulfilling the passing requirements, including attendance in video lectures, certain scores obtained from online tests, quizzes, assignments, group discussions, laboratories, and examinations.

=== Talented Youth Certificate Program ===
The Talented Youth Certificate Program is a series of courses mainly for secondary school students. These courses are developed from regular university courses with a less demanding work schedule, where students can explore and develop their own interests.

=== Chemists Online Program ===
The Chemists Online Program was a collaborative project between Hong Kong universities and secondary schools. In 2011, the program was funded by the Quality Education Fund. Led by Lok Sin Tong Young Ko Hsiao Lin Secondary School and the Hong Kong Virtual University, 18 seminars covering chemistry topics have been organised, including synthetic polymers, gastronomy, nanomaterials and food chemistry. The content links with the senior secondary chemistry curriculum and extends to the latest advances in chemistry.

=== Chemists Online Self-study Award Scheme ===
In 2014, the scope of the Chemists Online Program was extended, forming the Chemists Online Self-study Award Scheme. In 2015, the course content was migrated to Open Canvas, another learning management platform. In Q4 of 2016, the scheme was offered to the HKMOOC platform, which was designed to sustain its increased scale of usage.

=== ExCEL Summer Program ===
The ExCEL Summer Program was a program that aimed to provide secondary school students opportunities to explore different university-level disciplines, experience university education, enhance students' learning profiles, strengthen critical thinking skills in knowledge discovery, and earn academic credits from university-level courses. Students who had completed both the online and face-to-face sessions of the single registered course can receive HKUST credits.

=== e-STEAM@Home Award Scheme ===
The e-STEAM@Home Award Scheme was a learning program for primary and secondary school students for self-directed learning at home. The scheme was offered by the HKVU in partnership with Hong Kong Education City (HKEdCity) and the HKUST-Lee Kum Kee Happy Family Learning Center (HFLC). In April 2020, there were 12 online courses offered under the scheme.

== Courses ==
Courses include:

- Introduction to Communication Studies (City U)
- Introduction to Cognitive Science (HKU)
- Mathematical Problem Solving Techniques (HKIED)
- Exploring Multimedia and Internet Computing (HKUST)
- Computer and Programming Fundamentals I (HKUST)
- Computer and Programming Fundamentals II (HKUST)
- Science, Technology and Society (HKUST)
- Critical Thinking (Lingnan University)

== Awards ==
The Hong Kong Virtual University program was the first runner-up in the Hybrid Learning Category of the Wharton-QS Stars Awards. The Chemists Online program also won the Natural Sciences Award. The Wharton School and QS recognize HKVU as “an outstanding contribution to innovation in learning".

== See also ==
- Online education
- Higher education in Hong Kong
- Education in Hong Kong
