= Kellogg-HKUST Executive MBA Program =

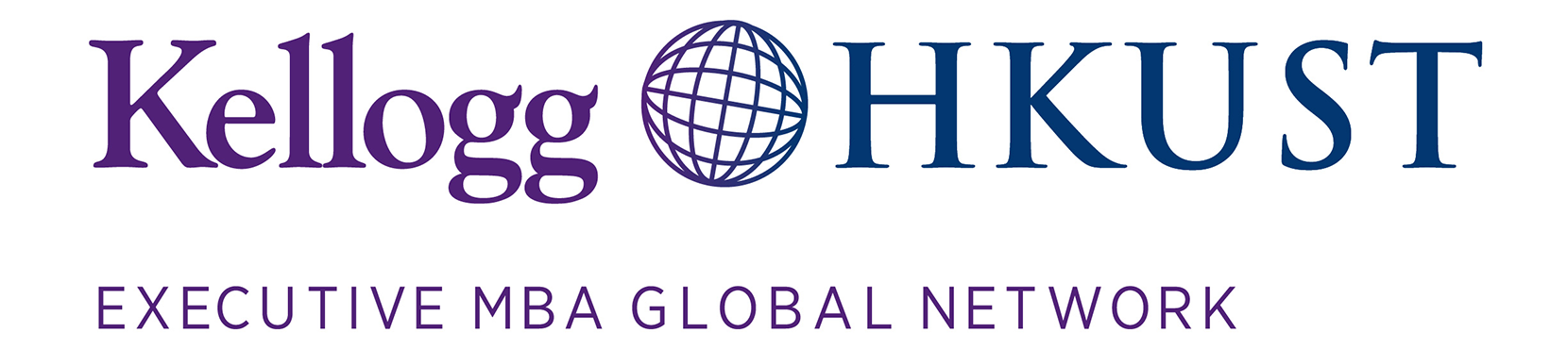
- Established: 1998
- Location: HKUST, Clear Water Bay, Hong Kong
- Website: https://emba.hkust.edu.hk

The Kellogg-HKUST Executive MBA Program (KHEMBA) is an executive MBA program Established in 1998 and run in partnership of the Kellogg School of Management at Northwestern University and The Hong Kong University of Science and Technology. It has been ranked as 1st-2nd best EMBA in the world by the Financial Times from 2010-2023.

The KHEMBA program is an 18-month part-time program taught by the faculty from Kellogg and HKUST. Upon successful completion, participants are awarded one Master of Business Administration degree issued jointly by both universities.

The student profile of the recent KHEMBA class of 2024 is made up of 44 students with an average age of 43 years old. The average years of work experience is 18. Participants have diverse backgrounds, representing 17 nationalities and 16 work locations.

== Notable faculty and alumni ==
- Mohanbir Sawhney
- Victor Herrero, Executive Chairman and CEO of Clarks
- Leon Jakimič, Founder and Owner of Lasvit
