= HKUST School of Medicine =

Medical school in Hong Kong

- 香港科技大學醫學院
- Type: Public medical school
- Established: 2025
- Affiliations: Hong Kong University of Science and Technology
- Location: Hong Kong
- Campus: Initial phase: Clear Water Bay (transitional school site); Long-term phase: Ngau Tam Mei, Northern Metropolis, Hong Kong
- Website: hkust.edu.hk/zh-hant/school-of-medicine

HKUST School of Medicine, full name The Hong Kong University of Science and Technology School of Medicine, is the medical school approved to be established by the Hong Kong University of Science and Technology (HKUST). On November 18, 2025, the Hong Kong government announced the Executive Council's approval for the establishment of Hong Kong's third medical school. The new school will offer a four-year second-degree Bachelor of Medicine and Bachelor of Surgery (MBBS) program, with an initial enrollment of approximately 50 students in the 2028/29 academic year.

== History ==
The idea of establishing a medical school at the Hong Kong University of Science and Technology originated with its founding president, Woo Chia-wei.

In 12 Oct 2023 and 22 February 2024, it were reported that the Hong Kong University of Science and Technology had proposed setting up a new medical school to address the mounting healthcare service need in Hong Kong. An important feature of the new medical school lies in its integration of artificial intelligence (AI) into medical education.

On October 16, 2024, the Hong Kong Government proposed the establishment of a "third medical school" in its 2024 Policy Address.

On October 17, 2024, the government announced the establishment of a "Working Group for the Preparation of a New Medical School," responsible for formulating the direction and guidelines for the new medical school. The group also plans to invite local universities interested in establishing new medical schools to submit proposals. Secretary for Health Lo Chung-mau hoped that the new medical school would adopt an innovative strategy of development that differentiates itself from the existing two medical schools, including in medical courses, student intake, and research projects, to drive the diversified development of local medical education and research, attract more local and overseas medical talents to undertake teaching and research work, and cooperate with Hong Kong's development into an international medical innovation hub.

On December 2, 2024, the Working Group for the Preparation of the New Medical School sent a letter to all funded universities of the University Grants Committee, inviting local universities intending to establish a new medical school to submit proposals for the construction of a third medical school.

On March 17, 2025, Hong Kong Baptist University, Hong Kong University of Science and Technology, and Hong Kong Polytechnic University, which intended to compete for the project, submitted proposals to the government respectively.

On May 3, 2025, the working group met with the three universities to discuss their proposals in depth and gain a better understanding of their contents.

On June 17, 2025, the working group met with the three universities for the second time to exchange views on the specific implementation plans of their proposals. Each university further introduced its overall plan for implementing the new medical school proposals to the working group, including curriculum content, clinical training for medical students, construction of teaching facilities, and funding arrangements, and responded to the opinions and targeted questions raised by the working group after the first meeting.

On November 18, 2025, the Executive Council of Hong Kong Government approved the establishment of a "third medical school" by the Hong Kong University of Science and Technology (HKUST). HKUST won the competition by a clear strategic position, broad global vision, robust financial plan, and other advantages.

The establishment of the new medical school campus is planned to be completed in 2034-35, in two phases. In the initial phase: the Clear Water Bay transitional school building will be built on the present campus of the Hong Kong University of Science and Technology. In the long-term phase: a permanent campus will be built in the University Education City in the Northern Metropolis area of Ngau Tam Mei. The medical students of HKUST would get their training at different public hospitals before the new teaching hospital is available in Ngau Tam Mei.

== Features ==
The HKUST Faculty of Medicine is positioned to differentiate itself from the existing Li Ka Shing Faculty of Medicine at the University of Hong Kong and the Faculty of Medicine at the Chinese University of Hong Kong.

Firstly, the new MBBS program of HKUST is a four-year second-degree program for university graduates, while the other two universities offer six-year MBBS programs for high school graduates.

HKUST emphasizes a "medical-engineering integration and research-oriented" approach, not just compressing a traditional six-year program into a four-year program. The new program aims to cultivate a new generation of medical professionals with both clinical practical skills and the ability to apply cutting-edge technologies (such as artificial intelligence, biotechnology and data science).

== Other information ==
Professor Wai Ping-kong, President of Hong Kong Baptist University, expressed his respect and sincerely congratulated the Hong Kong University of Science and Technology on being recommended to establish the new medical school, wishing HKUST to cultivate more next-generation medical talents for Hong Kong. He also said, “The Institute of Frontier Translational Medicine, established during the preparation of the proposal for the new medical school, will continue to develop into a leading research and development center in the fields of medical science and healthcare, focusing on innovation, technology transfer, and practical application.”

The Hong Kong Polytechnic University congratulated the Hong Kong University of Science and Technology on its selection to establish the third medical school. University president Professor Teng Jinguang stated that PolyU would continue to develop its focus on "medical-engineering integration," expand clinical cooperation with hospitals, advance the translation of medical research, and train medical professionals in response to demand. He added that the university aims to contribute to Hong Kong's development as a hub for medical training, research, and innovation.

HKUST plans to invest HK$7 billion in the new medical school over the next 25 years. It expects to enroll its first batch of 50 students in the four-year second-degree medical program in 2028, primarily (about 80%) local students, with the first batch of graduates expected to begin internships in 2032. The university anticipates that enrollment will gradually increase to 200 students per year after the Ngau Tam Mei campus opens.

Six clinical professors have already joined the HKUST medical faculty. Another 36 senior scholars have signed letters of intent to join the school. Professor King Li, who holds an MD from the University of Toronto, previously served as the Founding Dean of the Carle Illinois College of Medicine and currently holds an adjunct professorship at Stanford University School of Medicine, was appointed as the Founding Dean of HKUST's School of Medicine in June, 2026.

See also

- Hong Kong University of Science and Technology
- Li Ka Shing Faculty of Medicine,
- CUHK Faculty of Medicine,
