= Leon Jakimič =

Czech entrepreneur

- Born: February 23, 1975 (age 51); Liberec, Czech Republic
- Education: Loyola Marymount University
- Occupations: Founder and owner of Lasvit
- Years active: 2007–present
- Parent: Leo Jakimič

Leon Jakimič (born February 23, 1975) is a Czech entrepreneur, founder and owner of glassmaking company Lasvit.

== Life and career ==
Leon Jakimič was born in Liberec, Bohemia in 1975. He received a tennis scholarship in California at Loyola Marymount University in Los Angeles, where he studied Economics. The family originally came from Serbia, but later fled to Russia to escape the Turkish invaders. The sixth generation of the Jakimič family currently lives in the Czech Republic. He graduated from the Kellogg-HKUST Executive MBA Program in 2005. In 2007 he founded Lasvit, company designing and manufacturing bespoke light fittings, feature glass installations, and lighting collections. Recently he lives in Hong Kong.

== See also ==
- Bohemian glass
