= Student court =

Judiciary of a student government

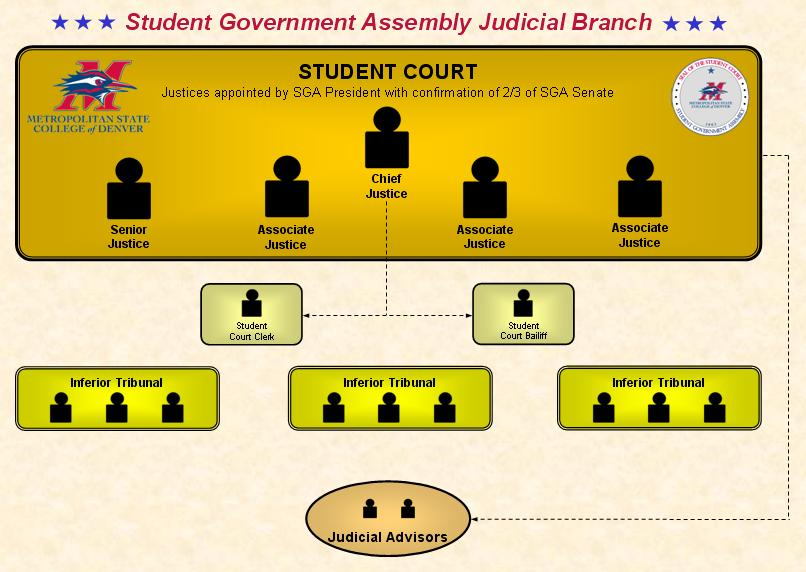
Structure of the student judiciary at Metropolitan State College of Denver

A student court is a type of judicial system occasionally seen in student governments, both at the secondary level and in universities. Student courts vary in size and functions, but they are most often engaged in conflict resolution and interpretation of student bylaws and constitutions. Names of student courts vary, with the body variously referred to as the "Student Court," "Judicial Council", the "Judicial Board", the "Supreme Court," "Residence Hall Judiciary," or others. Typically, however, student governments only possess legislative and executive branches. Student courts are a less-common feature of student governments.

The methods of selection for student courts also vary: at some institutions, the elected student body president nominates and appoints student court members with the consent of the elected student representative assembly; at others, a search committee interviews potential members who are subsequently nominated and officially appointed; at still other institutions, the sitting members of the student court actually participate in the process of nominating and selecting new court members.

== Debate ==
Arguments in favour of having student courts often hinge on the idea of separation of powers, on the basis that the legislative bodies of student governments should not have the power to police themselves. Other arguments in favour include having the judicial system removed from partisan politics, having a neutral body to make decisions on issues such as election appeals, and greater transparency.

Arguments against having student courts often hinge on practicality, with critics saying that students are not necessarily qualified to make judicial decisions, or that university ombudspersons are better placed to fulfill the same role. Other arguments include a lack of accountability from student courts as well as the additional bureaucracy that is created and the cost that it entails.

== Student courts in Canada ==
=== Alma Mater Society of the University of British Columbia ===
The judicial body of the Alma Mater Society of the University of British Columbia is the Student Court. The Student Court is granted the power to "exercise disciplinary powers over the Society’s organizations and members."

It is composed of 5 judges and two alternate judges, all appointed by the AMS Council, with the Chief Justice also being named by the AMS Council. The Chief Justice must be a law student. The decisions of the Court only become binding once the AMS Council ratifies them.

The Student Court was created in the 1970s, but had been inactive from 2009 to 2015, until the AMS Council filled the positions again.

=== Carleton University Students' Association ===
The judicial body of the Carleton University Students' Association is the Constitutional Board. The CUSA constitution gives the Constitutional Board the authority to "rule that any act of Students' Council, its members, its officers, or its agents is in contravention of the Constitution, any Bylaw or Policy of the Association."

The Constitutional Board is composed of 5 members appointed by the Students' Council, of which 4 must be students and the fifth is the university's ombudsperson, who acts as chair. There are also two alternate members. Constitutional Board members serve one year terms, and cannot be members of the Students' Council. Meetings of the Board are held publicly, and decisions of the Board cannot be appealed.

=== Student Federation of the University of Ottawa ===
The constitution of the Student Federation of the University of Ottawa did not formally recognise a judicial body for the Federation, but, the powers of the Constitutional Committee closely resemble those of a student court. The committee had the power to make binding decisions, but those decisions could be overturned by the Board of Administration through a simple majority vote.

The Constitutional Committee was composed of 5 members of the Board of Administration, as well as two alternate members (also members of the Board of Administration) in the case of a conflict of interest. The members of the Constitutional Committee chose a member from among themselves to act as chair. Meetings of the committee were held in-camera.

The SFUO used to have a judicial system (originally known as the Student Court, and then the Student Arbitration Committee) independent from its BoA, but that body was abolished in 2011, and its powers transferred to the newly created Constitutional Committee.

=== University of Alberta Students' Union ===
The judicial body of the University of Alberta Students' Union is the Discipline, Interpretation, and Enforcement Board (also known as the DIE Board). The DIE Board is governed by the union's Bylaw 1500, which defines the Board as "the organ of the Students’ Union responsible for the interpretation and enforcement of Students’ Union legislation," and gives the Board scope to rule on complaints made regarding possible constitutional violations, interpretation of union legislation and rulings made by the elections office.

The DIE Board is composed of one Chief Tribune, two Associate Chief Tribunes and 5 to 11 additional tribunes. The tribunes are appointed through recommendation of the Tribune Selection Committee and ratification by a 2/3rds vote of the Students' Council. Tribunes cannot be members of the council, members of Council committees or be an employee of the Union, and hold office until they graduate, resign or are impeached by a 2/3rds vote of the Students' Council.

=== University of Calgary Students' Union ===
The University of Calgary Students' Union has two judicial bodies: the Review Board, acting as the lower student court, and the Tribunal, acting as the higher student court.

The Review Board consists of 9 people, appointed by the Student Legislative Committee from a list provided by the Nominations Committee. Of the 9 members of the Review Board, at least 5 must be students and at least 2 must be non-students. The chair of the Review Board must be one of the students. The Tribunal consists of 5 people, appointed by the SLC from a list provided by the Nominations Committee. Of the 5 members of the Tribunal, at least one must be a student and at least one must be a non-student. The chair of the Tribunal must be one of the non-students.

Members of the Review Board and Tribunal serve two-year terms, unless during their terms they fail to meet one of a list of qualifications, including having been a member of SLC, the University of Calgary Board of Governors, Senate, or General Faculties Council, being an executive for a student club, being an employee of the Union and taking part in any student election (other than just voting).

=== University of Manitoba Students' Union ===
The judicial body of the University of Manitoba Students' Union is the Judicial Board. The decisions of the Judicial Board cannot be overturned by any other UMSU body.

The Judicial Board is composed of one UMSU member acting as chair, three Councillors, and five additional UMSU members. The members of the Judicial Board are appointed by the Selections Committee, and cannot be employees of the Union or executives.

== Student courts in Hong Kong ==
=== University of Hong Kong (HKU) ===
The judicial body of the Hong Kong University Students' Union is the Judicial Committee (JC). It follows the Union Council Judicial Procedure and serves as the Union's ultimate judiciary. According to the Terms of reference of Judicial Committee (JC):

（a） It shall follow the Judicial Procedure;

（b） It shall, as decided by the chairperson or instructed by the Union Council, form working groups to enquire into any complaint which has been made by any Union member or sub-organization;

（c） The working group shall determine the relevant facts and shall hence determine whether the complaint is a genuine one;

（d） The working group shall, on completion of its investigation, arbitrate as it deems desirable;

（e） The working group shall, report its findings and make recommendations to the Union Council;

（f） The working group shall have the power in its sole discretion to have access to such documents from any Union sub-organizations as are relevant for the purposes of its investigations.

=== Chinese University of Hong Kong (CUHK) ===
The judicial body of the Student Union of the Chinese University of Hong Kong is the Judicial Committee ( Chinese: 司法委員會). According to their website, it is formed by two courts: The Court of First Instance and the Court of Appeal. The Court of Appeal is the final court of appeal within the Union, whereas the Court of First Instance primarily deals with cases at first instance.

The Court of First Instance hears:

（a） disciplinary charges contrary to Union statutes laid against a Union Member;

（b） charges laid against a public officer of the Union following an impeachment; and

（c） application for judicial review.

The Court of Appeal hears appeals from the Court of First Instance, as well as points of law relating to the Constitution referred to by the President of the Union or the Chairperson of the Representative Council.

=== Hong Kong University of Science and Technology (HKUST) ===
The judicial body of the HKUST Students' Union is The Court. According to The Hong Kong University of Science and Technology Students' Union Constitution, The Court shall be the judiciary body of the Union and shall have the following power and duties:

（a） to settle disputes within the Students' Union; and

（b） to call for further information and may require any member or suborganization of the Students' Union to give any relevant evidence in respect of its arbitration; and

（c） to impose penalties on sub-organizations or members of the Students' Union in accordance with the provisions of the Students' Union Constitution; and

（d） to quash any resolution of a General Meeting, that is in conflict with the Students' Union Constitution or a resolution passed by a Referendum; and

（e） to quash any legislative resolution of the council, that is in conflict with the Students' Union Constitution, a resolution passed by a Referendum or a General Meeting, or an existing valid legislative resolution passed by the Union Council; and

（f） to quash any administrative resolution of the council, the executive committee and the editorial board that is illegal, irrational, or procedurally improper; and

（g） to interpret the Students' Union Constitution.

=== City University of Hong Kong (CityU) ===
The judicial body of the City University of Hong Kong Students' Union (CityUSU) is the Arbitration Committee ( Chinese: 仲裁委員會). According to their website, It has jurisdiction in respect of matters conferred on it by the Students' Union Constitution and Arbitration Committee by-law.

The Arbitration Committee is authorised :

（a） to hand all disputes and complaints within the Students’ Union; and

（b） to interpret the Constitution and the by-laws of the Students' Union, all resolutions of the Union Council, and all regulations formulated by the executive committee; and

（c） to declare that the resolutions of the Union Council or the regulations formulated by the executive committee are void on the basis of being unconstitutional; and

（d） to handle complaints concerning a General Polling or the outcome of the elections of student societies; and

（e） to consider possible disciplinary actions against any full member.

=== Hong Kong Polytechnic University (PolyU) ===
The judicial body of the Hong Kong Polytechnic University Students' Union is the Union Judicial Council ( Chinese: 仲議會). According to their Constitution, It is the supreme judicial authority responsible for all arbitration and judicial issues of the Union. It has the duties and powers of:

（a） punishing members and organizations violating the Constitution of the Students' Union in accordance therewith;

（b） settling and arbitrating all prosecutions in the Students' Union;

（c） settling prosecutions or arbitrating disputes among organizations and between members and organizations;

（d） verdict in accordance with the principal spirit and purposes of the Constitution of the Students' Union;

（e） requiring any member or organization of the Students' Union to provide relevant materials of a certain affair, where such member or organization shall be notified three (3) working days in advance in written;

（f） summoning any member or organization representatives to attend litigation meetings;

（g） settling appeals of the Students' Union's staffs on its regulations and contracts.

== Student courts in Singapore ==
=== National University of Singapore ===
==== Adjudication Committee ====
Prior to January 2016, the judicial body of the National University of Singapore Students' Union (NUSSU) was the Adjudication Committee (AC).

The Adjudication Committee was established in August 2012, at the recommendation of the Constitution Review Commission. The commission was convened to carry out a comprehensive redrafting of the Union's Constitution, and after "look[ing] into the governance structure of other Student Unions, including foreign ones", it was "[i]n particular…impressed with the Adjudication Committee in the City University of Hong Kong Students' Union". Citing the Singapore Court of Appeal's dictum in Chng Suan Tze v Minister for Home Affairs that "all power has legal limits", it envisaged the Adjudication Committee as "an organ within the Union governance structure to enforce such legal limits and resolve disputes between Constituent Clubs or members".

The Adjudication Committee's functions were to adjudicate disputes within the Union, interpret the Union's Constitution and hear appeals arising from disciplinary actions.

During its three-year existence, the Adjudication Committee made two reported decisions. In Re Yale-NUS College Students [2014] NUSSU AC 2, it decided by a 5–2 majority that, as a matter of constitutional interpretation, Yale-NUS College students were not Union members. One dissenting panel member wrote that "YNC students should be integrated into the Union so as to prevent segregation of the student populace".

The Adjudication Committee was abolished in January 2016 "because its roles and responsibilities are redundant". In October 2018, NUSSU invited applications to join the Adjudication Committee.

==== Council ====
Since January 2016, the judicial power of the Union has been vested in the council, together with the Union's legislative power and executive authority.

==== Union Election Committee ====
The Union Election Committee has the power to adjudicate all disputes raised by candidates in the Executive Committee Elections or by constituent clubs' election committees.

== Student courts in the United States ==
In the United States, the student court at universities is most often called a Judicial Council, or Residence Hall Judiciary, for students living on campus.
