= Hong Kong University of Science and Technology Students' Union =

- Institution: Hong Kong University of Science and Technology
- Location: Clear Water Bay, Sai Kung, New Territories
- Established: 1992
- President: Megan LUI (2026–2027)
- Members: 1,257
- Affiliations: Hong Kong Federation of Students
- Website: hkustsu.com

Hong Kong University of Science and Technology Students' Union
- Traditional Chinese: 香港科技大學學生會
Transcriptions
Yue: Cantonese
- Yale Romanization: Hēung góng fō geih daaih hohk hohk sāang wuih
- Jyutping: Hoeng^{1} gong^{2} fo^{1} gei^{6} daai^{6} hok^{6} hok^{6} saang^{1} wui^{6}

The Hong Kong University of Science and Technology Students' Union (HKUSTSU) is the students' union at the Hong Kong University of Science and Technology.

The union is an organisation registered with the Hong Kong Police Force under the Societies Ordinance (Cap. 151 of the Laws of Hong Kong), independent from the university but officially recognised by the university administration. It acts as the umbrella organisation for most student societies at the university, with the exception of organisations directly sponsored by university departments and offices (Note: Including Student Ambassadors and HKUST International Students Association.).

In the aftermath of the enactment of Hong Kong's national security law, as of 2026 HKUSTSU is now the only functioning students' union operating out of Hong Kong's publicly-funded universities. (Note: The City University of Hong Kong Students' Union continues to operate but is no longer recognised by the university and has been banished from the campus.)

== History ==
The idea of a students' union representing all HKUST students was conceived as soon as the first ever cohort of HKUST students started school in October 1991. The Hong Kong University of Science and Technology Students' Union was officially established on 27 November 1992, after a lengthy preparation process that involved two attempts of referendums.

Through a referendum staged in 2013, the union decided to affiliate itself to the Hong Kong Federation of Students, becoming the last university students' union to do so. The union remains one of the four member organisations of the federation, with no disaffiliation referendum being requisitioned during the 2015 disaffiliation movement in other universities.

Unlike most university students' unions in Hong Kong, which have either lost institutional support or been forced to disband amid the post-2019 political climate, HKUSTSU remains recognised by the university as a bridge between the student body and the administration, and continues to serve as the umbrella organization for most student societies on campus. Nevertheless, the university has curtailed some of the support previously provided to the union, including the long-standing arrangement to collect union membership subscriptions alongside tuition fees through its online payment systems. This has led to a decline in membership from 'several thousand' before 2019 to 800 in 2025.

== Objectives ==
As delineated in the Constitution of the HKUSTSU, the union aims to:

- To promote social, culture, sporting and academic activities amongst members.
- To promote civic consciousness amongst members.
- To promote the welfare of members.
- To represent members in matters affecting their interest.
- To facilitate the development of the university.

== Structure ==
The ultimate authority within the union is vested in resolutions passed by Referendums, whilst the second highest authority is the General Meeting.

The union consists of four independent statutory bodies, namely the Executive Committee, the Council, the Court, and the Editorial Board, which act as the executive, legislative, judicial branches and the press agency respectively.

Office-bearers for the Executive Committee and the Editorial Board, as well as Popularly Elected Councillors for the Council, are elected in the Annual Elections held every year in February. Councillors other than the ten popularly elected seats are returned by nomination of their respective representations, while judges of the Court would be appointed by the Council or a general meeting under the recommendation of the Judge Recommendation Committee.

=== Executive committee ===
The Executive Committee, HKUSTSU 香港科技大學學生會幹事會

People and organisations
- President: Megan LUI

History
- Election: By-election 2026
- Legislature term: 33rd Union Council
- Predecessor: 32nd Executive Committee

The Executive Committee (幹事會) is the executive branch of the union, responsible for the day-to-day administration of the union. It also possesses the authority of representing all union members to participate in external affairs.

Headed by the President, the Vice-President (Internal) and Vice-President (External) of the union, eight standing committees are formed under the Executive Committee to take care of issues regarding the Union and its members, including:

- Academic Affairs Committee
- External Affairs Committee
- Public Relations Committee
- Publication Committee
- Social Committee
- Orientation Affairs Committee
- University Affairs Committee
- Welfare Committee

=== Council ===
The Council, HKUSTSU 香港科技大學學生會評議會
- Session 2026–2027

Type
- Type: Unicameral

Leadership
- Council Chairperson: Chloe WONG
- Council Vice Chairperson: Thomas HO
- Council Chief Secretary: Mika LEE

Structure
- Composition: Occupied Seats Council Officials (3) The Executive Committee (4) The Editorial Board (2) Independent Clubs Association (3) Art and Cultural Clubs (3) Sports Association (3) House Association (4) Schools (11) Popularly Elected Councillor(s) (2) Previous Union Session (3) Vacant Seats Popularly Elected Councillor(s) (8)

Constitution
- Constitution of the Hong Kong University Students' Union

The Council (評議會) acts as the legislature branch formed by representatives from different fields within the Union. There are a total of 34 seats to be filled by representatives of the Executive Committee, the Editorial Board, House Student Associations, Independent Clubs Association and Sports Association, Art and Cultural Clubs, school and departmental societies, as well as another 10 seats popularly elected by all union members.

It is responsible for legislation and regulation of finance and operations of Union, including the holding of all elections regarding the union; consideration and approval of applications for affiliation to the Union; supervision, advice, proposing and passing rules and regulations on all sub-organisations; interpretation of and proposing amendment to the Constitution of Union; as well as the consideration and approval of Master Budget of the Union and applications for Union subsidies.

To practice the above duties, the Council has five standing committees, namely the Affiliated Societies Committee, the Constitution Committee, the Council Administration Committee, the Election Committee and the Finance Committee.

=== Court ===
Chaired by the Chief Justice, The Court (仲裁會) is the judiciary body of HKUSTSU, responsible for settling disputes within the Union in a court setting arbitrated by judges. It also provides interpretation to the Constitution when need arises.

=== Editorial Board ===
Being the sole press agency within the university, The Editorial Board (編輯委員會) is responsible for maintaining WINGS (振翅) and WINGS High Fly Post (振翅之高飛報), the official publications of Union, providing chances for the free expressions of opinion among the student body.

It is responsible for the enrichment of students' awareness on university affairs, social issues and lifestyle, as well as the promotion of literary development within the university. The board also monitors the other organs of the union thru the pressure of public opinion.

The board consists of an Editor-in-Chief, two Assistant Editors-in-Chief, a Financial Controller, an Administrative Officer, a Marketing Officer as well as a number of Feature Editors and Designers.

== Activities ==
=== Affiliated societies ===
There are over 100 affiliated societies of different interests and academic disciplines affiliated to the union, under control and supervision by the Union Council's Affiliated Societies Committee (ASC). Apart from "Department-Associated Groups" (previously known as "sponsored student groups") supported by academic departments and administrative offices, all student societies recognised by the university authority are affiliated under the Students' Union.

There are six types of affiliated societies in HKUST:

- Independent Clubs Association (ICA) and Independent Clubs – mainly interest clubs and often local chapters of inter-university or international organisations. Societies not falling into any of the following classifications shall be affiliated to ICA.
- Art and Cultural Clubs (ACC) – societies promoting art and cultural purposes.
- Sports Association (SA) and Sports Clubs
- House Associations – students' societies of the undergraduate student halls affiliated to the Students' Union. Such organisations, which exist in the five older undergraduate halls (UG Hall I-IV, PG Hall II), organise extra-curricular activities for their members so as to instil a sense of belonging and unity.
- Departmental Societies – most academic departments and programmes of study of the university have their own student societies. These societies would organise different activities to serve students of their corresponding departments.
- School Societies – societies representing students of the four schools and the Interdisciplinary Programs Office.

According to the Internal Regulations of the Union, all affiliated societies must bear ", HKUSTSU" as the suffix of their full name in English (while in Chinese, "香港科技大學學生會" must be added as the prefix). The suffix is omitted in the following list for the sake of clarity.

List of HKUST Students' Union societies

ICA and Independent Clubs

- Independent Clubs Association
- AIESEC-LC-HKUST
- Art Club
- Campus Crusade for Christ
- China Entrepreneur Network
- China Study Society
- Chinese Culture Society
- Chinese Folk Art Society
- Chinese Orchestra
- Christian Choir
- Christian Fellowship
- Comics and Animation Society
- Contract Bridge Club
- Culinary Art and Culture Society
- Current Affairs Research Enlightenment
- Debating Society
- Drama Society
- Film Society
- Games Society
- Golden Z Club
- Greater China Vision
- Hong Kong Career Match Association
- International Cuisine Society
- Korean Students' Association
- Magic Club
- Model United Nations Society
- Nature Club
- People's Campus Radio
- Progressust
- Rotaract Club of HKUST
- South Asian Students' Society
- Student Astronomy Club
- Student Social Service Society
- Taiwanese Students' Association
- The Band Society
- The Catholic Society
- The Hong Kong Award for Young People User Unit
- The Linguistics Society
- The Photographic Society
- The University Choir
- University Philharmonic Orchestra
- University YMCA – HKUST
- Yo-hoo Club

House Associations

- The Undergraduate House One Students' Association
- VERTEX, House II Students' Association
- Glacier, HOUSE III Students' Association
- Vista, House IV Students' Association
- Endeavour, House V Students' Association

School Societies

- The Business Students' Union
- The Engineering Students' Union
- The Humanities and Social Science Students' Union
- Interdisciplinary Programs Students' Union
- Science Students' Union

Departmental Societies of the School of Business and Management

- Accounting Students' Society
- Information Systems, Business Statistics and Operations Management Students' Society
- Management Students' Association
- The Economics Students' Society
- The Finance Students' Society
- The Marketing Students' Society

Departmental Societies of the School of Engineering

- The Computer Science and Engineering Students' Society
- The Civil and Environmental Engineering Students' Society
- The Electronic and Computer Engineering Students' Society

Departmental Societies of the School of Science

- Biochemistry Students' Society
- Chemistry Students' Society
- International Research Enrichment Students' Society
- Mathematics Students' Society
- The Biology Students' Society
- The Physics Students' Society

Departmental Societies for Interdisciplinary Programs

- Environment Students' Society
- Risk Management and Business Intelligence Students' Association

Sports Association and Sports Club

- Sports Association
- Archery Club
- Cricket Club
- Dance Society
- Distance Runners' Club
- Fencing Club
- Gym and Fitness Society
- Handball Club
- Hockey Club
- Judo Club
- Kendo Club
- Korfball Club
- Rowing Club
- Rugby Club
- Shaolin Martial Arts Club
- Social Dance Society
- Softball Club
- Sport Climbing Students' Society
- Squash Club
- Student Basketball Club
- Students' Badminton Club
- Students' Football Club
- Students' Karate Club
- Students' Swimming Club
- Table Tennis Club
- Taekwondo Club
- Tai Chi Club
- Tchoukball Club
- The Netball Club
- The Student Tennis Club
- Track and Field Club
- Volleyball Club
- Wing Chun Martial Arts Society

=== Services and outlets ===
The union operates a Print Shop at the university's LG5 Student Amenities, providing photocopying and printing service to the public. A Students' Union Co-op Shop is also operated by the union, selling stationery, snacks and electronic devices at a discounted price to union members.

=== Student media ===
The union's editorial board publishes the student journal Wings (振翅). The publication predates the formation of HKUSTSU by nearly a year, with its inaugural issue released on 2 December 1991, two months after the first cohort of students began their studies at HKUST. Upon the union's establishment, Wings became its official publication.

Prior to 2019, around four issues of Wings were published each academic year, complemented by a subsidiary publication known as Wings High Fly Post. During the 2019–2020 Hong Kong protests and the subsequent suspension of face-to-face instruction, the editorial board shifted its focus to online journalism through social media platforms, and Wings is now published at irregular intervals.

=== Campaigning ===
After the 2014 Hong Kong protests, the union has been campaigning heavily for institutional autonomy. In March 2015, Andrew Liao was appointed as chairman of the Council, the supreme governing body of the HKUST, by Chief Executive CY Leung. As Liao was regarded as a keen supporter of Leung, the union issued a statement in opposition of the appointment on the grounds that it constituted alleged nepotism. In response to the union's statement, the government defended its decision as abiding by the rule of meritocracy.

In March 2016, three motions were put to referendum, calling for the abolition of the practice of HKSAR Chief Executive being the ex-officio university chancellor, the removal of Chief Executive's power of directly appointing University Council members, and the enhancement in the proportion of elected representatives from the student, faculty and alumni bodies, respectively. Submitted by the union executive committee, these motions were passed and became the official stance of the union.

On 5 June 2021, the union posted a lengthy post on Instagram denouncing vaccine mandates, creating minor controversy.

Following the imposition of the 2020 Hong Kong national security law, the union realigned its campaigning priorities on campus issues, preferring constructive dialogue with the university management over voicing its opinion on societal issues due to the risk involved.
