= Hong Kong University of Science and Technology =

Public university in New Territories, Hong Kong

The Hong Kong University of Science and Technology
- 香港科技大學
- Other names: HKUST, UST
- Type: Public research university
- Established: 10 April 1988; 38 years ago (date granted university status); 10 October 1991; 35 years ago (date officially opened)
- Academic affiliations: ASAIHL; APRU; CEMS; Washington University in St. Louis; McDonnell International Scholars Academy; BHUA; GHMUA
- Chancellor: John Lee Ka-chiu
- President: Nancy Ip
- Vice-president: Kar Yan Tam; Tim Kwang-Ting Cheng; Charles Wang-Wai NG; John Kwong
- Provost: Yike Guo
- Faculty: 973 (2026)
- Students: 20,475 (2025)
- Undergraduates: 11,765 (57.5%) (2025)
- Postgraduates: 8,710 (42.5%) (2025)
- Local students: 10,615 (51.8%) (2025)
- Non-local students: 9,860 (48.2%) (2025)
- Location: Tai Po Tsai, Clear Water Bay, Sai Kung, New Territories, Hong Kong; 22.338°N 114.263°E
- Campus: Rural, 60 hectares (0.60 km^{2})
- Language: English
- Colours: Blue & gold
- Sporting affiliations: USFHK
- Mascot: The Red Bird
- Website: hkust.edu.hk

Chinese name
- Simplified Chinese: 香港科技大学
- Traditional Chinese: 香港科技大學
Transcriptions
Standard Mandarin
- Hanyu Pinyin: Xiānggǎng Kējì Dàxué
Yue: Cantonese
- Yale Romanization: Hēunggóng Fōgeih Daaihhohk
- Jyutping: Hoeng1gong2 Fo1gei6 Daai6hok6
- IPA: [hœŋ˥.kɔŋ˧˥ fɔ˥.kej˨ taj˨.hɔk̚˨]

The Hong Kong University of Science and Technology (HKUST) is a public university in Sai Kung District, New Territories, Hong Kong. Founded in 1991, it was the territory's third institution to be granted university status, the first research university and the first university without any precursory existence upon its formation (Note: The University of Hong Kong, has its origins in the Hong Kong College of Medicine for Chinese, and the Chinese University of Hong Kong was established as a federation of three pre-existing post-secondary colleges.) with English as its primary medium of instruction and assessment since its establishment. It occupies a 60-hectare (150-acre) seaside site in Tai Po Tsai, Clear Water Bay Peninsula.

The university is organized into six academic schools: School of Science, School of Medicine, School of Engineering, School of Business and Management, School of Humanities and Social Science, and the Academy of Interdisciplinary Studies. In the 2025-26 academic year, it enrolled 11,765 undergraduates and 8,710 postgraduates, and employed 973 academic staff. All undergraduate programs lead to bachelor's honours degrees in Science (BSc), Engineering (BEng) or Business Administration (BBA).

The university is traditionally considered one of Hong Kong's "Big 3" universities, alongside The University of Hong Kong (HKU) and The Chinese University of Hong Kong (CUHK) due to their long history, strong academic programs, and high global standing.

== History ==
In the late 1980s, the Hong Kong Government anticipated a strong demand for university graduates to fuel an economy increasingly based on services. Sir Sze-Yuen Chung and the territory's governor, Sir Edward Youde, conceived the idea of establishing a third university, in addition to the pre-existing The University of Hong Kong and The Chinese University of Hong Kong.

Planning for the "Third University", as the university was known provisionally, began in 1986. On 8 November 1989, Charles, Prince of Wales (now King Charles III) laid the foundation stone of the campus, which was constructed at the Kohima Barracks site in Tai Po Tsai on the Clear Water Bay Peninsula. The site was earmarked for the construction of a new British Army garrison to house the 2nd King Edward VII's Own and 7th Duke of Edinburgh's Own Gurkha Rifles, but plans for its construction were shelved after the 1984 signing of the Sino-British Joint Declaration resulted in the downsizing of army presence in Hong Kong.

Originally scheduled to finish in 1994, the planning committee for the university decided in 1987 that the new institution should open its doors three years early, in keeping with the community's need and in fulfilment of the wishes of Youde, who died in 1986. The Royal Hong Kong Jockey Club pledged to contribute HK$1,500 million (later increased to $1,926 million) towards the construction cost of the university campus, and took up the role of project manager. This has the effect of accelerating construction as it relieved the project from complicated approval procedures for government capital projects.

The university was officially opened by Youde's successor as governor, Sir David Wilson, on 10 October 1991. Several leading scientists and researchers took up positions at the university in its early years, including physicist Leroy Chang who arrived in 1993 as Dean of Science and went on to become vice-president for academic affairs. Thomas E. Stelson was also a founding member of the administration.

The project was criticized for surpassing the budget set forth by the Hong Kong Government and the Royal Hong Kong Jockey Club. Under the fund-raising efforts of its president, Woo Chia-wei, the first students enrolled in October 1991. By 1992, the second phase of HKUST's campus was completed, expanding laboratories, student and staff accommodation, and athletic facilities to support about 7,000 students.

Several more expansion projects such as the construction of the Hong Kong Jockey Club Enterprise Center have since been completed.

=== "30 for 30" Campaign ===
In February 2023, to coincide with its 30th anniversary, HKUST announced "30 for 30" talent acquisition campaign, a global hunt for 30 leading academics to drive innovation in Hong Kong with 30 major research projects designed to have maximum social impact. The campaign focused on six areas: biomedicine, material science and future energy, artificial intelligence, fintech, green technology, and art technology.

=== University anthem ===
In 2023, the university commissioned a new university anthem, composed by Professor Kelvin Yuen.

== Governance ==
Established in 1991 under Chapter 1141 of the laws of Hong Kong (The Hong Kong University of Science and Technology Ordinance), HKUST is one of the eight statutory universities in Hong Kong. It is an institution funded by the University Grants Committee (UGC).

As with all other statutory universities in Hong Kong, the chief executive of HKSAR acts as the chancellor of HKUST. Prior to the transfer of sovereignty over Hong Kong, this was a ceremonial title bestowed upon the governor of Hong Kong.

The supreme governing body of the university is its Council, formed by a total of 27 members. Council members include university administrators, the chairperson of the alumni Convocation, an elected staff member, an elected full-time student representative, as well as 14 "lay members" not being employees or students at the university. Under the HKUST Ordinance, the chief executive of Hong Kong (as chancellor) possesses the power of directly appointing the chairman and vice-chairman of the council, the treasurer of the university, and not more than 9 of the lay members.

The Senate acts as the university's supreme academic body, responsible for making and reviewing the academic policies of the university. It is composed mostly of academic staff members but also includes the Students' Union president, an elected representative of the undergraduates as well as an elected representative of the postgraduates.

Being the supreme advisory body of the university, the Court is responsible for promoting the university's interests and to raise funds.

=== Senior management ===
President

- Nancy Ip (2022–)
- Wei Shyy (2018–2022)
- Tony Fan Cheong Chan (2009–2018)
- Paul Ching Wu Chu (2001–2009)
- Chia Wei Woo (1988–2001)

Provost

- Guo Yike (2022–)
- Lionel Ni (2019–2022)
- Wei Shyy (2010–2018)

Vice-Presidents

- Vice-President for Administration and Business: Kar Yan Tam
- Vice-President for Research and Development: Tim Kwang Ting Cheng
- Vice-President for Institutional Advancement: Charles Wang-Wai Ng
- Vice-President for Development: Ir John Kwong

Academic Registrar

- King Lau Chow (2026–)
- James Prince (2016–2026)

== Campus ==
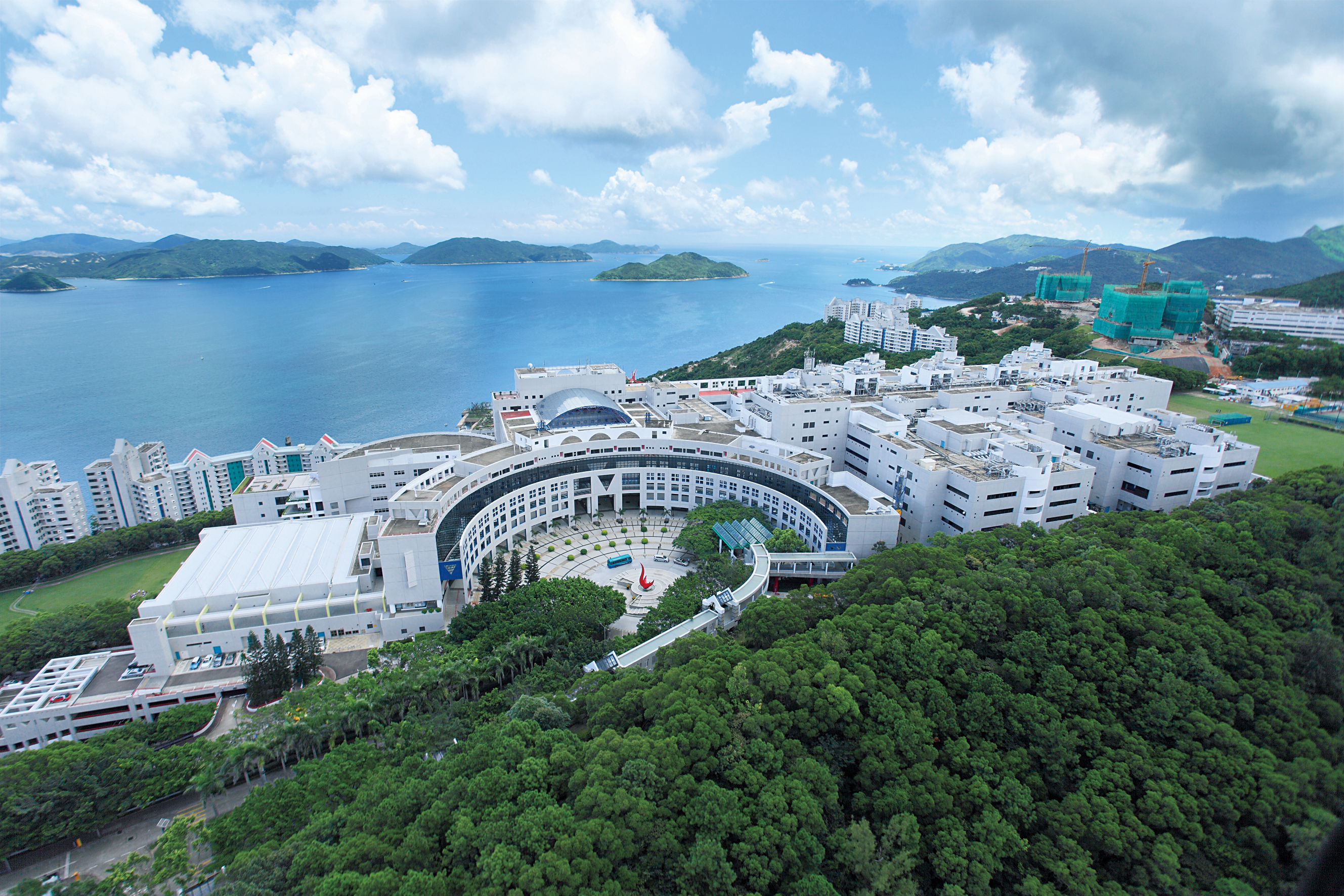
Bird's-eye view of the HKUST campus

The university is largely a campus university, occupying a 60-hectare site at the northern part of Clear Water Bay Peninsula in Sai Kung District, New Territories, Hong Kong, overlooking Port Shelter in Tai Po Tsai. The campus layout and architecture is based on a master plan submitted jointly by Simon Kwan & Associates and Percy Thomas Partnership, the runner-up entry in an architectural competition held before the university was founded.

As the campus has a sloped terrain, buildings and facilities are built on separate terraces carved out of the hillside, with the academic facilities occupying the top-level terraces, and undergraduate halls of residence and sporting facilities at the seafront. The terraces are connected by motor roads as well as a network of footbridges and elevators known as Bridge Link.

The countryside setting of the university contributed to the fact that HKUST was once the only public university in Hong Kong not being directly served by an MTR station, prior to the re-titling of the Education University of Hong Kong. The university is connected to the metro network through public bus routes including 91, 91M, 91P, 291P and 792M, complemented by a handful of minibus services, with Choi Hung and Hang Hau stations being the major feeder points.

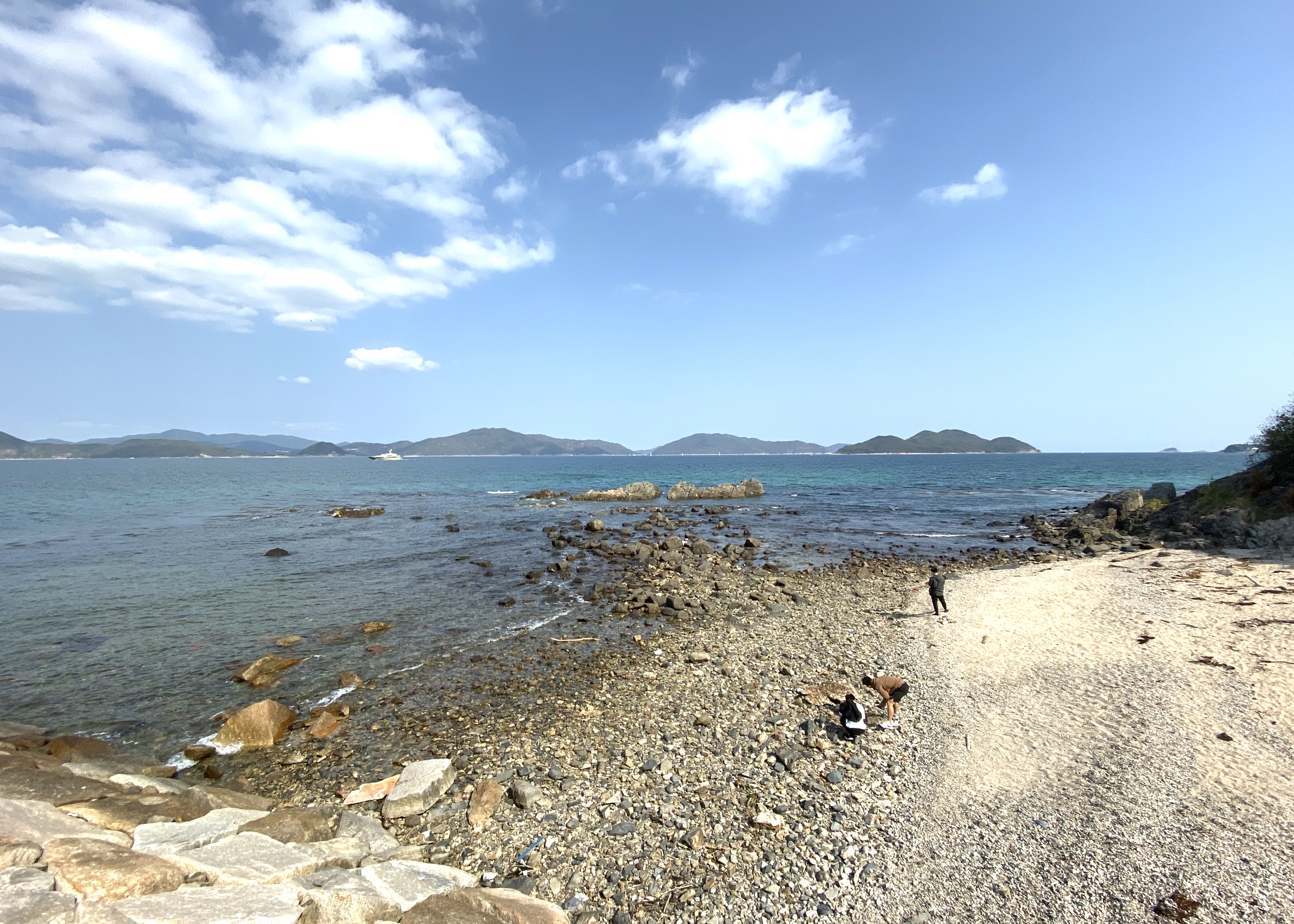
Beach below the promenade of HKUST that leads up to undergraduate residential halls

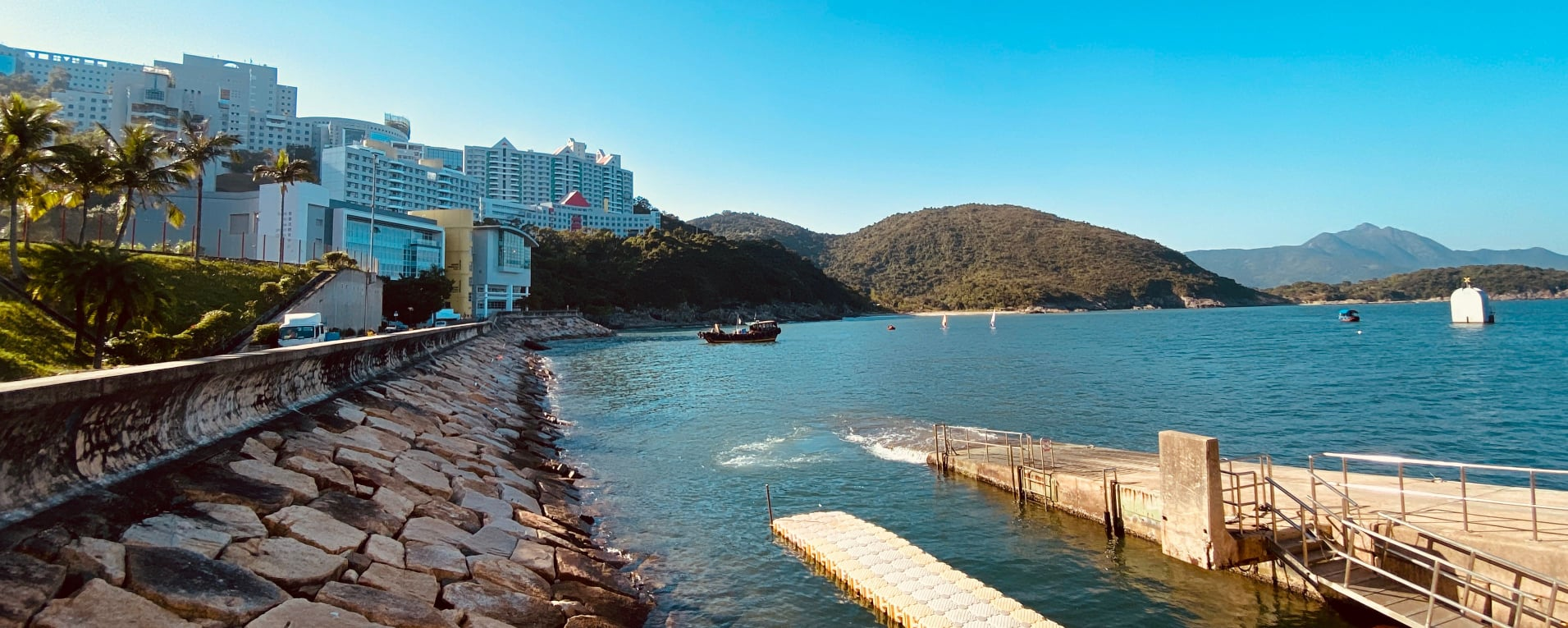
Western section of the promenade of HKUST

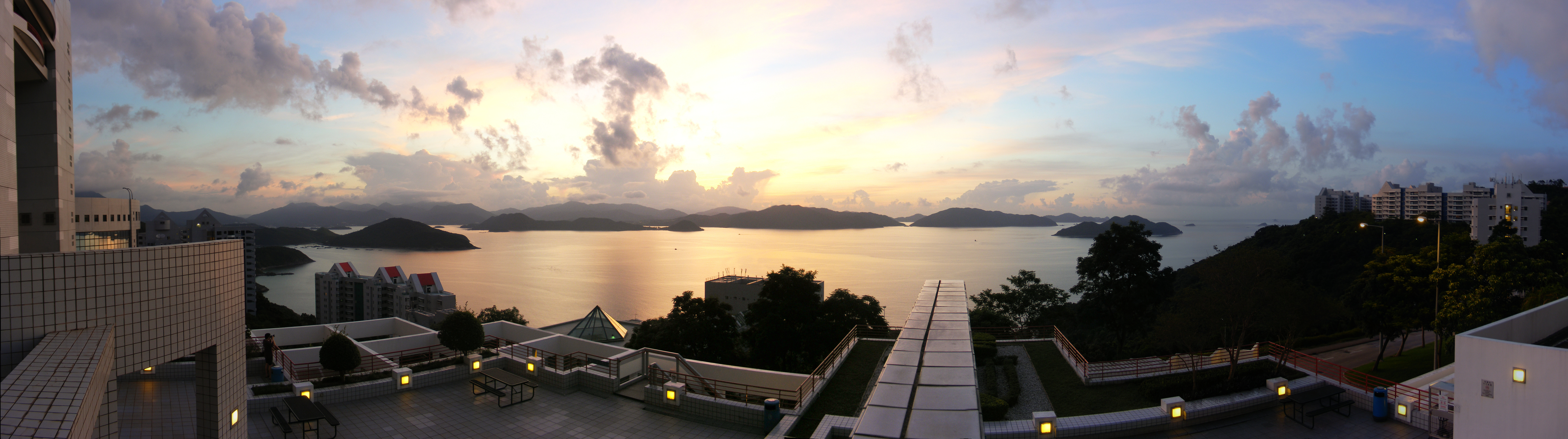
Sunrise at HKUST

=== Academic complexes ===
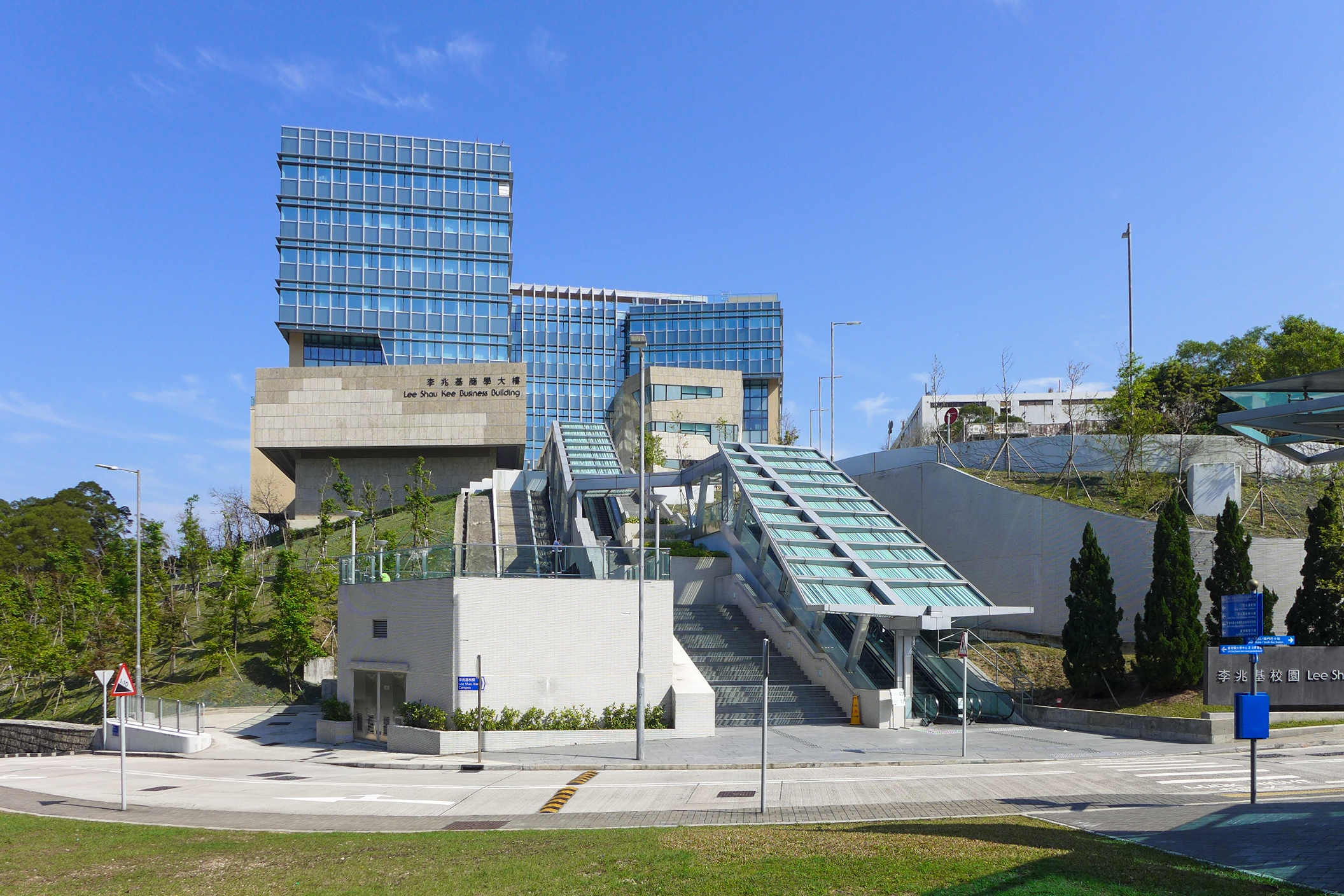
Lee Shau Kee Business Building houses the HKUST Business School

Academic activities are mainly conducted in the Academic Building, which contains 10 lecture theaters (A–H, J–K), a multitude of classrooms, laboratories and administrative offices. The lecture theaters can accommodate classes of up to 450 students and offer audiovisual equipment. In addition, an information center and a souvenir shop can be found at the Piazza. The semi-outdoor Hong Kong Jockey Club Atrium located near the main entrance of the campus serves as the focal point of campus life, and is where major events such as student societies recruitment, performances, and (before the Shaw Auditorium opened) congregations are staged.

Prior to 2013, offices and classrooms of all of the four schools were grouped under the same roof in the Academic Building. With the completion of the Lee Shau Kee Business Building (LSK) in 2013, most facilities for the School of Business and Management have relocated from the Academic Building. Opened in 2015, the Cheng Yu Tung Building (CYT) afforded the other schools with a lecture theater (L), additional classrooms and laboratories.

Located at the southern tip of the campus, the Lo Ka Chung Building houses the HKUST Jockey Club Institute of Advanced Study (IAS). The adjacent Conference Lodge, managed by the hotel-operating arm of Chinachem Group offers on-campus accommodation for conference attendees and official guests of the university.

=== Sundial ===
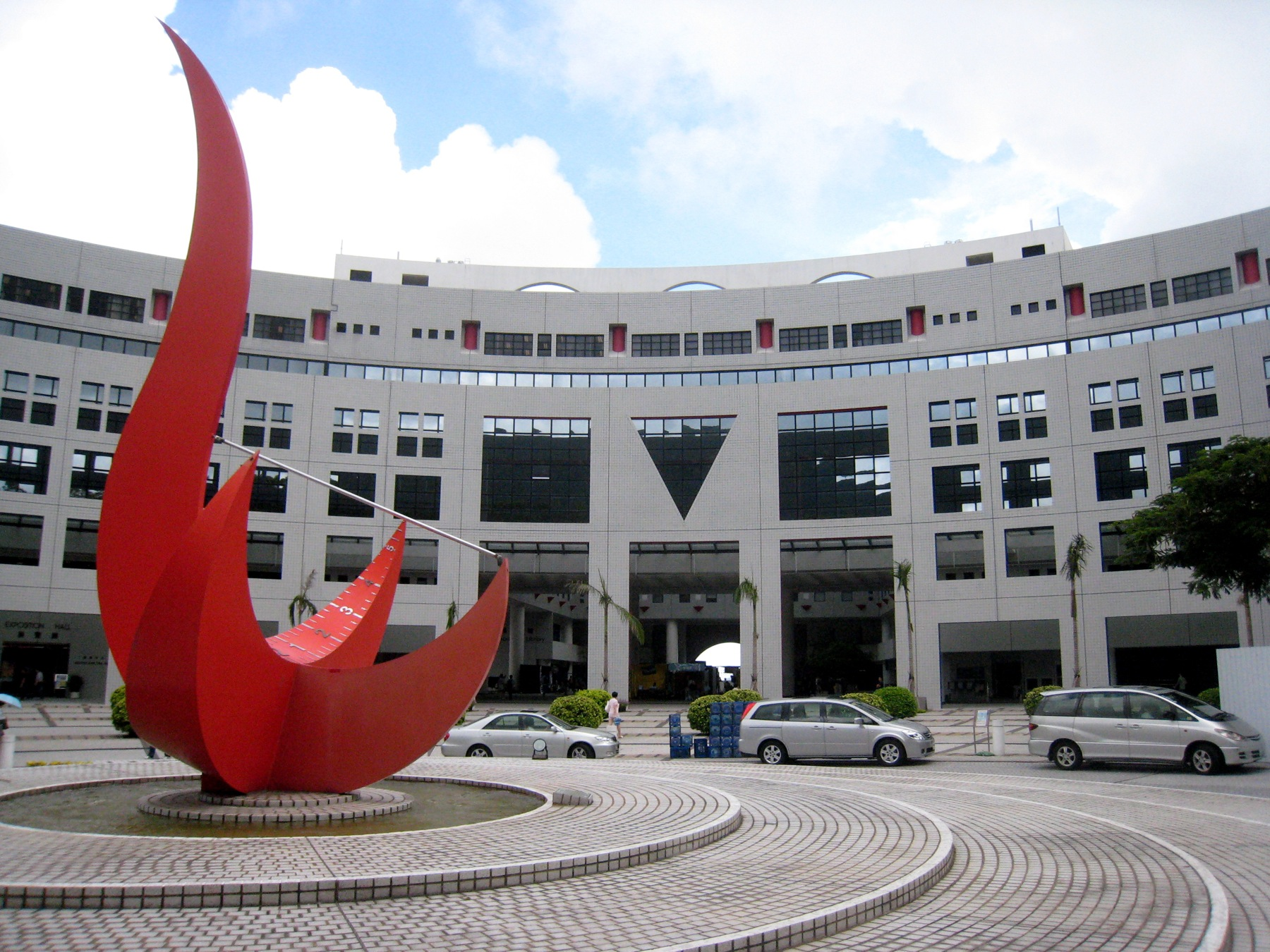
The "Red Bird" sundial sculpture

Anchoring the entrance piazza outside the Atrium, the red sundial sculpture is an important symbol of HKUST. The 8.5-metre-tall (28 ft) sculpture is entitled "Circle of Time" but is more widely known as the Red Bird or the Turkey (火雞). It was the work of Australian sculptors Charles Smith and Joan Walsh-Smith. Its dual function as a functioning sundial and a work of art symbolizes the synthesis of art and science.

=== Student halls and staff housing ===
A total of nine undergraduate halls are located at the seafront and mid-rise terraces of the university campus. Also, the university provides 404 Senior Staff Quarters flats and 40 University Apartments flats to its eligible senior staff.

=== Lee Shau Kee Library ===
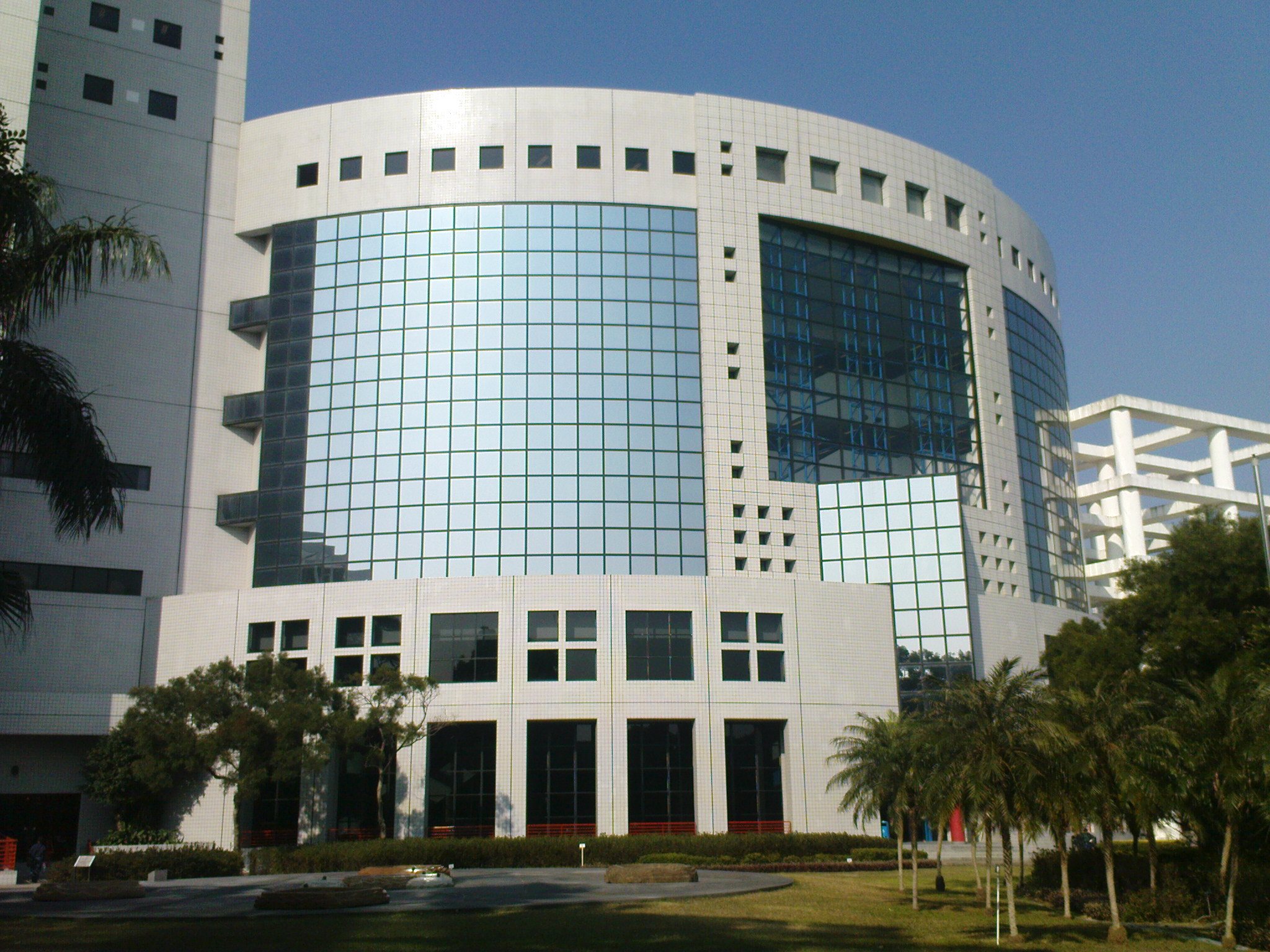
HKUST Library Building

The HKUST Lee Shau Kee Library, part of the Hong Kong Academic Library Link (HKALL), occupies a central location of the campus. Connected to the Academic Building, it is accessible directly from the Hong Kong Jockey Club Atrium. It spans five floors with over 12,350 sq m of floor space, providing more than 3,674 seats as well as computing facilities. It offers a wide array of information resources, both local and remote. In addition to over 720,000 print and electronic volumes and a large collection of media resources, it provides access to more than 47,000 periodical titles, a large number of e-books, databases, and other digital information resources.

The library owns a collection of old maps of China and the rest of Asia, produced by Chinese and Western cartographers over the last 500 years. A selection of these maps, providing an insight into the history of international geographic knowledge, was published by the library in a limited-edition (1000 copies) volume in 2003.

=== Shaw Auditorium ===
Built with funds donated by the Shaw Foundation, Shaw Auditorium is a 4-storey multi-purpose auditorium designed for concerts, lectures, musicals and visual productions. The building consists of three superimposed elliptic rings surrounding a sculptural core. The rings that blend into the architecture provide shade and rain protection around the building. The auditorium is equipped with modular seating that can be adapted to allow for multiple arrangements, ranging from 850 to up to 1300 seats. Its curved walls can function as a 360-degree projection screen, enabling audio-visual experiences.

HKUST opened Shaw Auditorium on 17 November 2021, as part of a celebration of the university's 30th anniversary.

=== Ancillary services ===
The campus boasts 18 catering outlets including fast food restaurants, a Chinese restaurant as well as a restaurant serving international cuisine; other ancillary facilities in the academic complexes include two banks, two 7-Eleven convenience stores, a supermarket, clinics (consisting of a medical clinic providing free outpatient service to all full-time students and staff, a student dental clinic, and a staff dental clinic) and Students' Union offices.

=== Sustainable Smart Campus as a Living Lab initiative ===
In 2019, HKUST launched the Sustainable Smart Campus as a Living Lab initiative. The initiative aims to transform the campus into a testing ground for learning, experimenting, and advancing smart and innovative ideas to address real-life challenges. Wei Shyy, the former President of HKUST, said the initiative is to "nurture a new generation who can produce original solutions with a sustainability mindset." As of 2021, around 30 sustainability-related projects have been launched. HKUST launched "Blockcerts" platform in 2020 which is a blockchain-based degree authentication system to verify the documents such as graduation diplomas and academic transcripts. HKUST is the first university in Hong Kong to launch a similar system.

=== HKUST (Guangzhou) ===
In 2018, HKUST signed collaboration agreements with Guangzhou municipal government and Guangzhou University to establish The Hong Kong University of Science and Technology (Guangzhou) (HKUST(GZ)) in Nansha, Guangzhou. On 29 June 2022, Ministry of Education of the People's Republic of China approved the establishment of HKUST(GZ), which is the third university co-managed by mainland China and Hong Kong. HKUST(GZ) officially opened on 1 September 2022.

== Reputation and rankings ==
University rankings

Global – Overall
- ARWU World: 201-300 (2026)
- QS World: 33 (2027)
- QS Under 50: 2 (2021)
- THE World: 58 (2027)
- THE Reputation: 97 (2025)
- THE Young Universities: 3 (2024)
- USNWR Global: 82 (2026-2027)

Regional – Overall
- QS Asia: 9 (2027)
- THE Asia: 12 (2026)

=== Overall Rankings ===
Globally, HKUST is #33 in QSWUR 2027, #58 in THEWUR 2026, #82 in USNWR 2026-2027, #20 in THE's Sustainability Impact Rankings 2026 (#1 in Hong Kong), and #2 in THE's Most International Universities in the World 2026.

HKUST was ranked #23 worldwide in the Nature Index's normalized leading academic institutions ranking published in 2019.

HKUST has previously been ranked #1 by the independent regional QS University Rankings: Asia for three consecutive years between 2011 and 2013. HKUST has also been ranked 28th globally and 1st in Hong Kong by QSWUR 2016.

HKUST has formerly been ranked #3 by the independent regional THE Asia University Rankings and #1 in Hong Kong in 2019. HKUST was also ranked 41st worldwide by THEWUR 2019.

The THE's World Reputation Rankings of 2018 considered it the second reputable in the territory, while it was #1 in the HKU Public Opinion Programme survey (2016).

HKUST also ranks #1 among all local universities in funding under the Innovation and Technology Commission's RAISe+ Scheme (Research, Academic and Industry Sectors One-plus Scheme), securing a cumulative total of 19 funded projects across the first three rounds. Its commercialisation efforts are further supported by an internal HK$100 million RAISe+ Project Fund and its 1st-place local standing in RAE 2020, where over 81% of its submitted research was rated world-leading (4*) or internationally excellent (3*).

=== Young University Rankings ===
One of the world's fastest growing institutions, HKUST ranked #1 in Times Higher Education Young University Rankings in 2019 and #2 by QS world's under-50 universities in 2020.

=== Most International University Rankings ===
HKUST ranked 2nd in Times Higher Education Most International University Rankings in 2026.

=== Subject Rankings ===
QS World University Rankings by Broad Subject Area 2026:

Broad Subject Area	HKUST's world rank
Engineering & Technology	40
Social Sciences & Management	50
Natural Sciences	72

THE rankings by subjects 2026:

Subject	HKUST's world rank
Computer Science	25
Business & Economics	30
Engineering	38
Physical Sciences	57
Life Sciences	100
Social Sciences	101–125
Arts and Humanities	126–150

U.S. News & World Report Best Global Universities Ranking by subjects 2026:

Subject (only subjects ranked within world's top 50 are shown)	HKUST's world rank
Computer Science	10
Engineering	23
Artificial Intelligence	25
Materials Science	27
Civil Engineering	34
Electrical Engineering	42
Chemistry	44
Energy and Fuels	49

2026 Global Ranking of Academic Subjects (GRAS) by ShanghaiRanking:

Subject (only subjects ranked within world's top 50 are shown)	HKUST's world rank
Computer Science & Engineering	6
Robotic Science & Engineering	12
Electrical & Electric Engineering	15
Telecommunication Engineering	16
Transportation Science & Technology	17
Artificial Intelligence	21
Chemistry	42
Mechanical Engineering	44

=== Graduate Employability Rankings ===
According to THE's Global University Employability Ranking 2027, the university's graduates have the highest employment rate among universities in Hong Kong, and ranked among the top 30 worldwide for 14 years in a row.

=== Business School Rankings ===
Since debuting at #24 globally and #1 in Asia-Pacific in the inaugural UTD Top 100 Business School Research Rankings (2000–2004), making it the sole Asian institution in the global Top 50. HKUST Business School has placed inside the global Top 35 across every annual edition for over two decades. Over the cumulative period, HKUST held the #1 research output in Asia, and it continues to hold the highest cumulative total in Asia while ranking #27 globally and #2 in Asia in the latest 5-year rolling window (2021–2025).

Times Higher Education (THE) have also previously ranked HKUST Business School as #1 in Asia. In the THE World University Rankings by Subject 2018, HKUST ranked #1 in Asia and #14 globally in Business and Economics.

==== MBA Ranking ====
According to Bloomberg Businessweek Best Business School Ranking, HKUST's MBA program is #1 in Asia-Pacific.

The Financial Times ranks HKUST's MBA program #24 globally, #1 in Hong Kong and #4 in Asia. QS also ranks HKUST MBA program #45 globally, #1 in Hong Kong and #4 in Asia.

==== EMBA Ranking ====
The Kellogg-HKUST Executive MBA (EMBA) program has been ranked No. 1 in the world in the Financial Times Global EMBA Ranking 2026. This marks a historic 13th time the joint program has secured the top spot globally. QS also ranks the Kellogg-HKUST Executive MBA (EMBA) program #1 globally for joint programmes in 2017 and 2019.

== Academic organisation ==
=== Schools and departments ===
The university is organised into five schools that offer undergraduate and postgraduate programs:

- Business and Management
- Engineering
- Humanities and Social Science
- Medicine
- Science

HKUST's School of Business and Management (SBM) is branded the HKUST Business School. It has over 140 faculty personnel. The school offers degree programs– undergraduate, MBA, EMBA, MSc and PhD – and a range of executive education programs, including the Kellogg-HKUST EMBA which was one ranked the best EMBA program by the Financial Times. The school includes the departments of Accounting; Economics; Finance; Information Systems, Business Statistics & Operations Management (ISOM); Management; and Marketing. They are supported by ten research centers assigned to areas from business case studies and investing to Asian family business and China business & management.

The School of Engineering (SENG) is the largest of HKUST's schools. It has 7 departments/divisions: Chemical and Biological Engineering, Civil and Environmental Engineering, Computer Science and Engineering, Electronic and Computer Engineering, Industrial Engineering and Decision Analytics, and Mechanical and Aerospace Engineering. The school provides more than 40 degree programs at the bachelor's, master's and doctoral levels, and houses the only chemical engineering department in Hong Kong. In 2019, Times Higher Education World University Rankings in Engineering and Technology placed HKUST Engineering No.23 globally, the best ever position achieved by any local university since the establishment of this league table in 2010. QS World University Rankings by Subject 2019 – Engineering and Technology ranked HKUST No.18 globally which made SENG No. 1 in Hong Kong for nine consecutive years. SENG has over 150 exchange partner universities in 28 countries/regions in the world. It is also widely recognised as the birthplace of modern drone technology. In 2009, a research team led by Prof. Li Zexiang (who famously mentored Frank Wang, the founder of DJI) developed the world's first miniature helicopter capable of autonomous flight near Mount Everest. Equipped with GPS and onboard inertial measurement units, this aircraft successfully executed pre-programmed flight paths and transmitted real-time data under extreme high-altitude conditions.

The School of Humanities and Social Science (SHSS) supports interdisciplinary academic training and research in fields including anthropology, creative writing, economics, history, innovation studies, linguistics, literature, music, philosophy, political science, and sociology, through its two divisions: Humanities and Social Science.

In November 2025, the Executive Council of Hong Kong approved the plan proposed by the university to set up a School of Medicine, with enrollment to start in 2028. The medical degree that will be given upon graduation will be a 4-year post-graduate Bachelor of Medicine and Bachelor of Surgery (MBBS). The new medical school plans to admit 50 students, with one-third being non-local students.

Within the School of Science (SSCI) are the Division of Life Science, the Department of Chemistry, the Department of Mathematics, the Department of Physics, and the Department of Ocean Science. The school emphasises the whole-person development and international exposure of students. Its undergraduate exchange program provides science students with international learning opportunities throughout their studies, teaming up with over 100 exchange partners from regions including Australia, Canada, the United Kingdom, the United States, Mainland China, and Japan.

In addition to the five professional schools, the university also boasts the Academy of Interdisciplinary Studies. Programs offered by the academy bring together two or more different fields of study, offering a great opportunity for students with more than one interest to integrate their abilities. These programs respond to Hong Kong's needs and global trends, and research projects in partnership with industry and the community are encouraged The academy houses the divisions of Art and Machine Creativity, Environment and Sustainability, Integrative Systems and Design, and Public Policy, as well as the Division of Emerging Interdisciplinary Areas.

=== Research institutes and centers ===
==== Nansha graduate school ====
On 25 January 2007, the HKUST officially named its graduate school in Nansha as HKUST Fok Ying Tung Graduate School/ Guangzhou HKUST Fok Ying Tung Research Institute in a ceremony that combined the official opening of the graduate school and the ground-breaking of its Nansha campus.

==== Jockey Club Institute for Advanced Study ====
The HKUST Jockey Club Institute for Advanced Study (IAS) at HKUST champions collaborative projects across disciplines and institutions. It forges relationships with academic, business, community, and government leaders. The inaugural lecture of the IAS organised was given by the noted physicist Prof. Stephen Hawking in June 2006.

== Student life ==
=== Student body ===
For year 2023–24, HKUST enrolled 10,347 undergraduates and 6,842 postgraduates, with over 40% (~2,000 undergraduates & ~5,000 postgraduates) of the total enrollment being non-local (not holding Hong Kong citizenship). In terms of student population, the School of Engineering is the largest among the university's four schools, hosting 34% and 38% of HKUST's undergraduates and postgraduates respectively; this was followed by the schools of Business and Management (33%/24%), Science (21%/19%), Humanities and Social Science (3%/5%), and Interdisciplinary Programs (3%/1%).

The university saw the graduation of 2,389 undergraduate students, 668 research postgraduates and 2,934 taught postgraduates in the 2023-24 academic year, amounting to a total of 5,991 degrees being conferred.

=== Students' residence ===
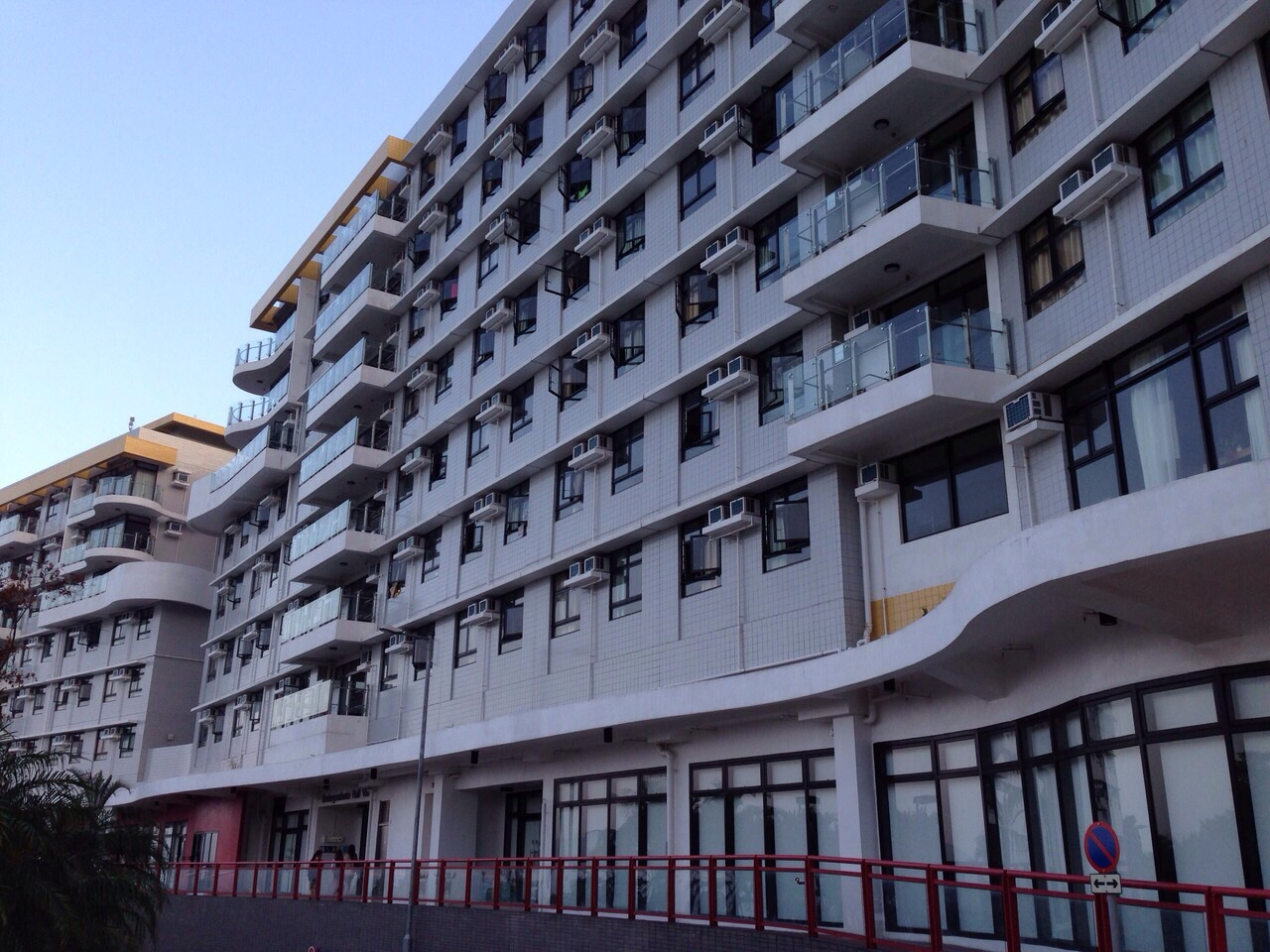
Undergraduate Hall VIII of HKUST

All full-time registered UG students and in-time (Note: Definition for in-time RPgs: 2 years for MPhil; 3 years for PhDs who have obtained an MPhil degree; 4 years for PhDs who do not have an MPhil degree before joining the program.; RPgs who will be studying beyond the above period in the academic year are regarded as out-time RPg) full-time HKUST research postgraduate students (RPgs) of the university are eligible to apply for student housing. Under the current policy, all local UG students are guaranteed at least one semester of hall residence in their first year of study upon application, whilst their non-local counterparts are provided at least two years of residency.

The nine on-campus undergraduate halls provide a total of 146 bed places in single rooms, 3,094 in double rooms (twin + bunk) and 792 in triple rooms. Another 512 bed spaces in double rooms at the off-campus HKUST Jockey Club Hall in Tseung Kwan O New Town are also provided for undergraduates. For research postgraduates students and visiting interns, 1080 on-campus residential places in single or double rooms are available.

Undergraduate halls of residence at HKUST
Name	House Students' Association or equivalent system	Notes
Lee Yin Yee Hall (UG Hall I) 李賢義樓(學生宿舍一座)	█ The Undergraduate House One Students' Association, HKUSTSU (社一)	First student residence in HKUST
UG Hall II 學生宿舍二座	█ Vertex, House II Students' Association, HKUSTSU (翱峰)	
UG Hall III 學生宿舍三座	█ Glacier, House III Students' Association, HKUSTSU (冰川)	
UG Hall IV 學生宿舍四座	█ Vista, House IV Students' Association, HKUSTSU (嶄越)	
UG Hall V 學生宿舍五座	█ Endeavour, House V Students' Association, HKUSTSU (卓毅)	
S H Ho Tower & Jockey Club Tower (UG Hall VI) 何善衡樓及賽馬會樓(學生宿舍六座)	"Living Learning Communities" (LLCs) system, implementation by the "Connection Team" formed by student residents	opened in 2004 as "New Hall"
Chan Sui Kau and Chan Lam Moon Chun Hall (UG Hall VII) 陳瑞球林滿珍伉儷樓(學生宿舍七座)	"Living Learning Communities" (LLCs) system, implementation by the "Leadership Team" of student residents	opened in 2009 donated by industrialist Dr Chan Sui-kau
UG Hall VIII 學生宿舍八座	No House SA formed, events organised by the Organizing Team formed by student residents	opened in 2013
UG Hall IX 學生宿舍九座	No House SA formed, events organised by the Organizing Team formed by student residents	opened in 2013
UG Hall X 學生宿舍十座		Opened in 2026
DJI Hall (UG Hall XI) 學生宿舍十一座（大疆創新樓）		Opened in 2026
UG Hall XII 學生宿舍十二座		Opened in 2026
UG Hall XIII 學生宿舍十三座		Opened in 2026
Jockey Club Hall 賽馬會大樓		HKUST's first off-campus hall, opened in 2016

There are also off-campus accommodations available. 15 apartments in Tai Po Tsai Village (TPT308 and Wan's Lodge) are rented by the university to accommodate 90 TPgs.

On 27 April 2012, research postgraduate students organised a sit-down strike to raise the voice of the voiceless and reiterate the concerns of the research postgraduate students about the serious housing issue.

=== Students' union ===
Formed in 1992, the Hong Kong University of Science and Technology Students' Union (HKUSTSU) is an organization independent from but recognized by the university administration. The union is governed by four independent statutory bodies, namely the executive committee, the council, the editorial board and the court. All undergraduates and postgraduates are eligible for membership in the union, although this is not compulsory.

The students' union oversees over 100 affiliated societies catering to students engaged in different academic disciplines, residential halls, sports and interests.

== See also ==
- Education in Hong Kong
- Higher education in Hong Kong
- List of universities in Hong Kong
- Hong Kong Virtual University – a collaboration project initiated by HKUST
- HKUST School of Medicine
