= Yenching Program =

The Yenching Program ( aka: Yenching Scholars Program) is a postgraduate program at the Yenching Academy of Peking University in Beijing, China. Launched in 2015, it offers a Master's degree in China Studies. The program aims to cultivate leaders with a nuanced understanding of China and its role in the world.

== Studies ==
Yenching Scholarships cover tuition, accommodation, transportation, and a living stipend for all students admitted to the Academy. Every year, scholars from across the globe are selected through an admissions process. The program's duration is one year, which is shorter than most graduate master's programs in China, where professional degrees usually require two years of study, while academic degrees generally take three years. Scholars may choose to extend their studies for a second year or pursue doctoral studies at Peking University.

The liberal undergraduate Yuanpei Program at Yuanpei College offers comparable opportunities for Peking University undergraduates.

== Research Areas ==
The Yenching Academy program requires each scholar to choose a research area from the following six options for their thesis, which will be supervised by a faculty member.

The research areas are:

- Economics and Management
- History and Archaeology
- Philosophy and Religion
- Politics and International Relations
- Law and Society
- Literature and Culture

== Residence ==
During their studies, Yenching Scholars live in the Yenching Academy, a residential college of Peking University. The college was designed specifically for the Yenching program. Located in the Haidan district of Beijing, the one-year program incorporates coursework, field studies, internships, and travel components.

== See also ==
- Yuanpei College at Peking University - a similar type of program for the undergraduate level
