= Yenching =

Yenching (Chinese: 燕京; pinyin: Yānjīng) can refer to:

- Beijing ("Yenching" is an older, alternative name of the city)
- Yenching Academy
  - Yenching Scholars
  - Yenching Program
- Harvard–Yenching Institute
- CCC Yenching College
- Yenching University
