= BESETOHA =

BESETOHA is a forum in which four representative East Asian universities—Peking University, Seoul National University, the University of Tokyo and Vietnam National University, Hanoi—meet to discuss the present state and future directions of university education, basic education and educational culture.

== History ==
BESETOHA was established in 1999. Involving the acknowledged flagships for their respective countries, this elite level initiative reflects the centralized educational cultures of the region, and in that way contrasts with more ecumenical regionalization initiatives such as the Bologna process. The BESETOHA forum takes its name from the first two Roman characters of the names of the participating universities.

== Bibliography ==
- Kyung, Eunyoung "From where I sit: Bologna, but with Asian spice", Times Higher Education, 13 December 2012.
