= Alliance of Asian Liberal Arts Universities =

International college and university association and consortium

- Formation: 2017
- Type: Nonprofit organisation
- Headquarters: Hong Kong
- Location(s): 7 countries and regions
- Members: 29
- Website: aalau.org

Alliance of Asian Liberal Arts Universities

Chinese name
- Traditional Chinese: 亞洲博雅大學聯盟
- Simplified Chinese: 亚洲博雅大学联盟
Transcriptions

Korean name
- Hangul: 아시아 리버럴 아츠 대학 연합

Japanese name
- Kanji: アジアリベラルアーツ大学連合

The Alliance of Asian Liberal Arts Universities (AALAU) is as a consortium of leading liberal arts universities located in countries and regions in East, South and Southeast Asia. Formed in November 2017, AALAU enable member universities to renew and reinvigorate the liberal arts education traditions and development. Its Alliance Secretariat located in Lingnan University in Hong Kong.

== Overview ==
Because university rankings have not been able to present teaching quality for a long time, 15 of universities with similar visions and characteristics have formed the alliance.

The founding member universities of AALAU are all well-known universities in their respective countries, their common feature is highly internationalized, high social reputation, and high education quality (high graduate achievement). Some of these members were selected as the "Top 10 Liberal Arts Colleges In Asia" by Forbes.

== Membership ==
The Alliance features 15 founding member universities (marking †). At present, AALAU has 29 members.

=== East Asia ===
==== Hong Kong ====
- Lingnan University †

==== Mainland China ====
- Duke Kunshan University †
- East China Normal University †
- Northeast Normal University
- NYU Shanghai
- University of Nottingham Ningbo China †
- Yuanpei College, Peking University †

==== Taiwan ====
- Fu Jen Catholic University †
- National Chengchi University †
- Tunghai University †

==== Japan ====
- International Christian University †
- Yamanashi Gakuin University
- Kyushu University
- Rikkyo University
- Sophia University †
- The University of Tokyo †
- Waseda University †

==== South Korea ====
- Dongguk University
- Ewha Womans University
- Kyung Hee University †
- Seoul National University †
- University of Seoul
- Yeungnam University
- Yonsei University †

=== South Asia ===
==== India ====
- Ahmedabad University
- Symbiosis School for Liberal Arts

=== Southeast Asia ===
==== Thailand ====
- Chiang Mai University
- Mahidol University International College
- Thammasat University

== See also ==
- Liberal arts college
- Global Liberal Arts Alliance
- ECOLAS
- List of higher education associations and alliances
