= Peking University =

Public university in Beijing, China

- 北京大学
- Seal
- Former name: Imperial University of Peking
- Type: Public
- Established: 11 June 1898; 128 years ago
- Affiliations: C9; IARU; AALAU; AEARU; APRU; BESETOHA; BHUA
- President: Gong Qihuang
- Party Secretary: He Guangcai
- Academic staff: 13,061
- Students: 49,821
- Undergraduates: 16,746
- Postgraduates: 17,120
- Doctoral students: 15,955
- Location: Haidian, Beijing, China; 39°59′24″N 116°18′05″E
- Campus: 274 ha (680 acres)
- Colours: Red
- Website: www.pku.edu.cn

Chinese name
- Simplified Chinese: 北京大学
- Traditional Chinese: 北京大學
Transcriptions
Standard Mandarin
- Hanyu Pinyin: Běijīng Dàxué
- Bopomofo: ㄅㄟˇ ㄐㄧㄥ ㄉㄚˋ ㄒㄩㄝˊ
- Wade–Giles: Pei^{3}-ching^{1} Ta^{4}-hsüeh^{2}
- Tongyong Pinyin: Běi-jing Dà-syué
- IPA: [pèɪ.tɕíŋ tâ.ɕɥě]
other Mandarin
- Xiao'erjing: بَےْجٍڭ دَاشُوَي
Yue: Cantonese
- Yale Romanization: Bākgīng Daaihhohk
- Jyutping: bak1 ging1 daai6 hok6
- IPA: [pɐk̚˥ kɪŋ˥ taj˨ hɔk̚˨]

Abbreviation
- Chinese: 北大
Transcriptions
Standard Mandarin
- Hanyu Pinyin: Běidà
- Bopomofo: ㄅㄟˇ ㄉㄚˋ
- Wade–Giles: Pei^{3}-ta^{4}
- Tongyong Pinyin: Běi-dà
- IPA: [pèɪ tâ]
other Mandarin
- Xiao'erjing: بَےْدَا

Peking University (PKU) is a public university in Haidian, Beijing, China. It is affiliated with and funded by the Ministry of Education. The university is part of Project 211, Project 985, and the Double First-Class Construction. It is also a member of the C9 League.

Founded in 1898 as the Imperial University of Peking by royal charter from the Guangxu Emperor, it is the second-oldest university in China after Tianjin University (established in 1895). In May 1912, the government of the Republic of China ordered the Imperial University of Peking to be renamed Peking University. After the People's Republic of China was established, the university merged with Yenching University during a nationwide restructuring of universities and academic departments in 1952. In April 2000, Beijing Medical University was merged into Peking University.

Peking University has eight faculties, namely Sciences, Informatics, Engineering, Humanities, Social Sciences, Economics and Management, Interdisciplinary as well as Health Science. It consists of 55 schools and departments, 24 research entities, and six affiliated hospitals. By 2024, Peking University's staff included 54 academicians of the Chinese Academy of Sciences, 16 academicians of the Chinese Academy of Engineering and 20 members of the World Academy of Sciences.

== History ==
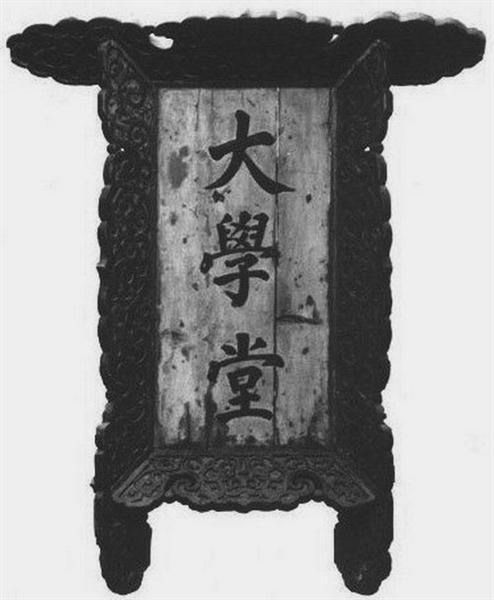
The plaque of the Imperial University of Peking.

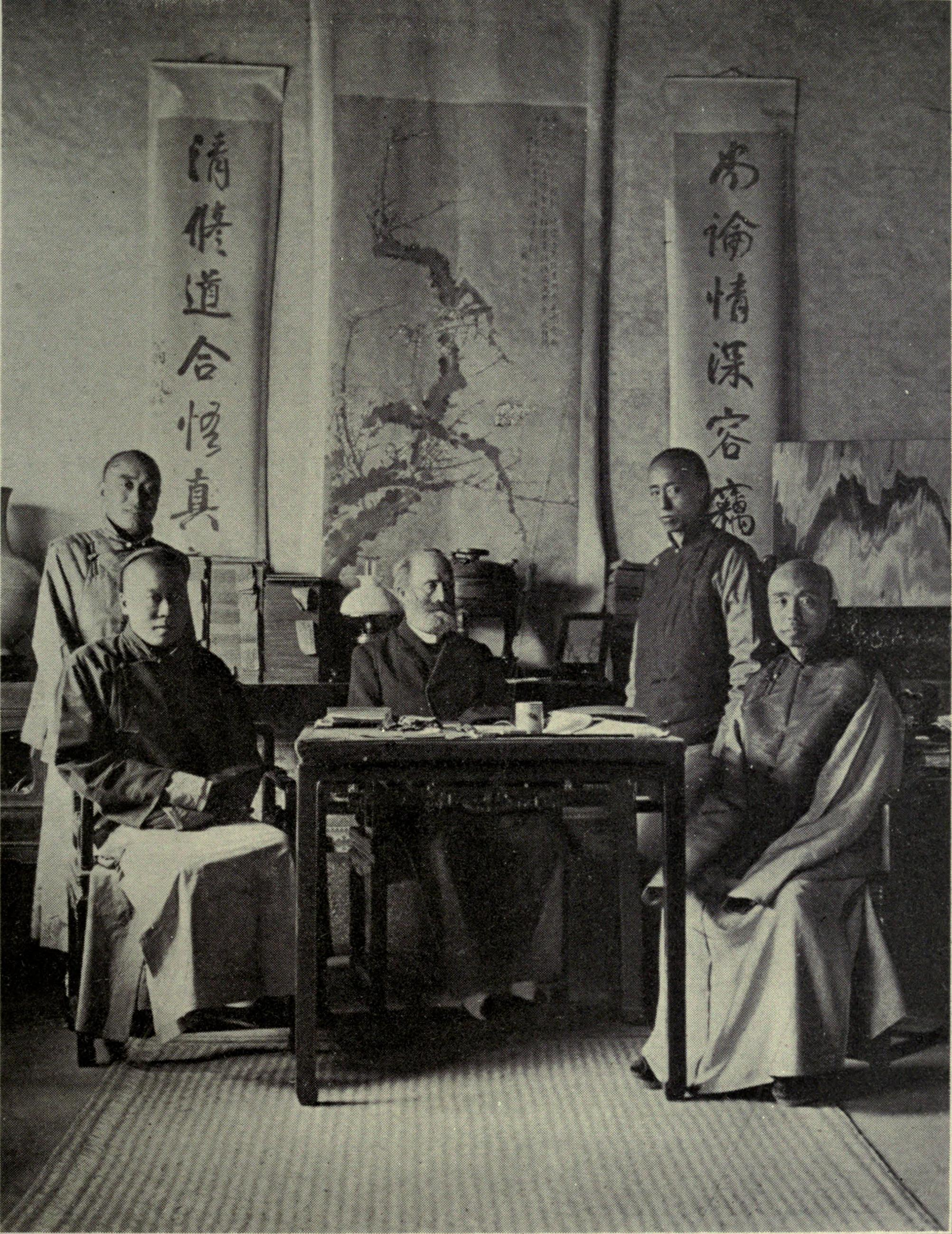
William Alexander Parson Martin, Dean of the Department of Western Learning, with his students.

=== Establishment ===
Following China's defeat in the Sino-Japanese War, intellectuals – including Kang Youwei, Liang Qichao, and Yan Fu – called for reforms to the country's education system. In June 1896, Minister Li Duanfen proposed to create a university in the capital. On 11 June 1898, the Guangxu Emperor, as part of the Hundred Days' Reform, authorised the creation of the Imperial University of Peking (Chinese: 京師大學堂; pinyin: Jīngshī Dàxuétáng; lit. 'Capital Grand Study Hall'). The Imperial University was formally established on 3 July 1898 when the emperor approved the royal charter written by Liang. Minister Sun Jianai was charged with the implementation. IUP served as the country's foremost institute for higher learning, but also as its highest educational authority. William Alexander Parsons Martin was appointed as the first president. Most of the reforms were abolished when the conservative Empress Dowager Cixi seized power on 21 September. The university survived with altered objectives and reduced scope. It opened on 31 December with 160 students, instead of the planned 500. The university offered classes in mathematics, astronomy, physics, botany, and zoology. It had laboratories with modern equipment.

Following the Xinhai Revolution, the Imperial University of Peking was renamed "Government University of Peking" in 1912 and then "National University of Peking" in 1919 (simplified Chinese: 国立北京大学; traditional Chinese: 國立北京大學; pinyin: Guólì Běijīng Dàxué).

=== Early Republic of China period (1916–1927) ===
The noted scholar Cai Yuanpei was appointed president on 26 December 1917. He helped transform Peking University into the country's largest institution of higher learning, with 14 departments and an enrollment of more than 2,000 students. President Cai, inspired by the German model of academic freedom, introduced faculty governance and democratic management to the university. Cai recruited an intellectually diverse faculty that included some of the most prominent figures in the progressive New Culture Movement, including Hu Shih, Liu Bannong, Ma Yinchu, Li Dazhao, Chen Duxiu, Lu Xun and Liang Shuming. Meanwhile, leading conservatives Gu Hongming and Huang Kan also taught at the university. A firm supporter for freedom of thought, Cai advocated for educational independence and resigned several times protesting the government's policy and interference.

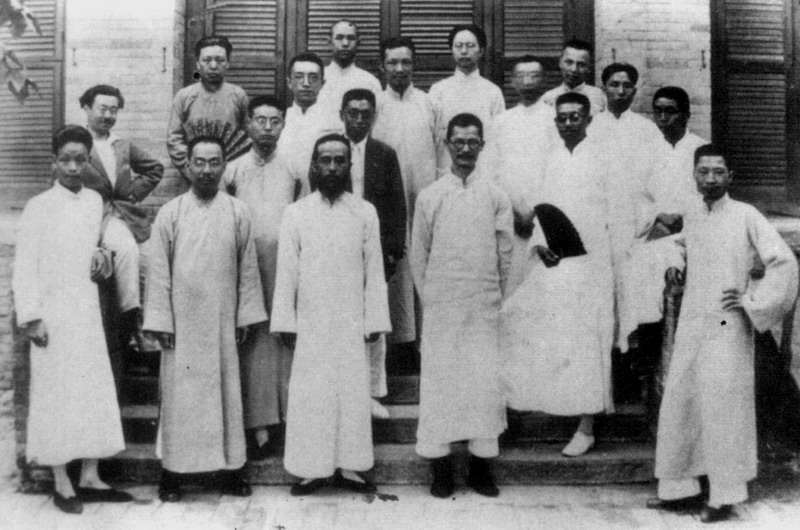
The faculty of Peking University Institute for Chinese Classics in 1924

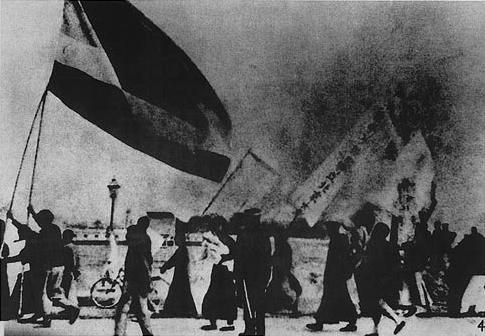
Peking University students protesting the Treaty of Versailles in the May Fourth Movement.

On 1 May 1919, several students of Peking University learned that the Treaty of Versailles would allow Japan to receive Germany's colonising rights in Shandong province. An assembly at Peking University that included these students and representatives from other universities in Beijing was quickly organised. On 4 May, students from thirteen universities marched to Tiananmen to protest the terms of Treaty of Versailles, demanded the Beiyang government to refuse to sign the treaty. Demonstrators also demanded the immediate resignation of three officials: Cao Rulin, Minister of the Ministry of Transportation, Zhang Zongxiang, China's Ambassador to Japan and Lu Zongyu, Minister of Currency, who they believed were in cooperation with Japanese. The protest ended up with some protesters being beaten and arrested, and Cao Rulin's house burned by protesters. Following the protest on 4 May, students, workers and merchants from nearly all China's major cities went on strike and boycotted Japanese goods in China. The Beiyang government eventually agreed to release the arrested students and fired the three officials under intense public pressure, China's representatives in Paris refused to sign the Treaty of Versailles.

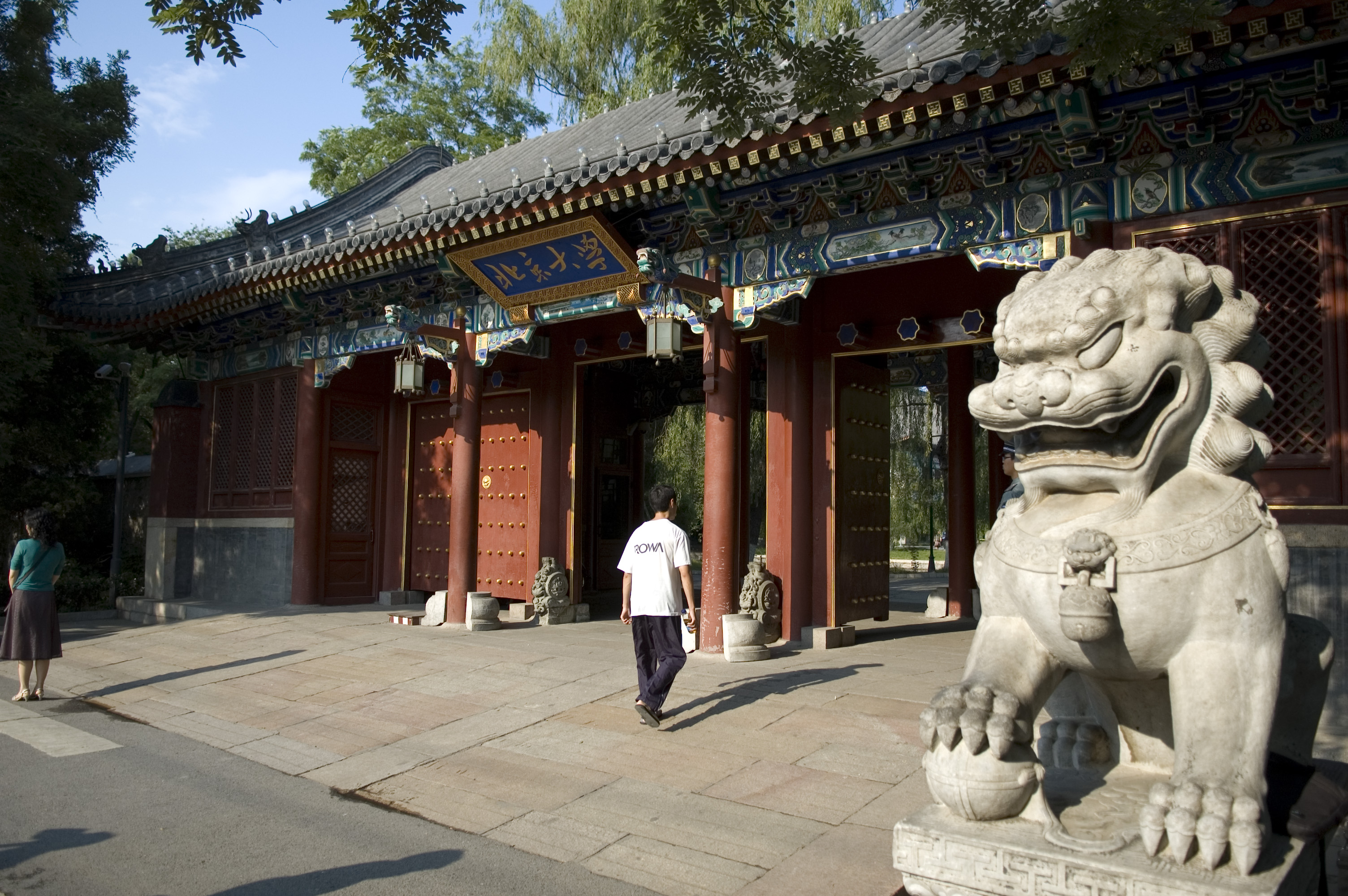
Peking University's West Gate, one of the symbols of the university campus

=== World War Two (1938–1946) ===
During the Second World War, Peking University staff joined Tsinghua University and Nankai University staff in establishing the National Southwestern Associated University. Based in Kunming, Yunnan, this institution saw a period of high productivity that would shape the course of Chinese intellectual history and its reconstruction post-war.

=== Mao era ===
During the Criticize Lin, Criticize Confucius campaign of 1973 to 1976, critique groups formed at Peking University and Tsinghua University disseminated commentaries under the pseudonym of "Liang Xiao". The pseudonym sounds like a person's name but is a homophone for "two schools".

=== 21st century (2001–present) ===
In October 2015, Peking University alumna and Professor Tu Youyou was awarded the Nobel Prize in Physiology or Medicine for her discovery of artemisinin. Having saved millions of lives, artemisinin has made significant contributions to global health in regard to the fight against malaria.

On 20 February 2017, the university officially signed a contract with the Open University to establish the Oxford Campus of Peking University HSBC Business School, Peking University Oxford Center and Shenzhen Oxford Innovation Center.

On 29 June 2020, the Sino-Russian Mathematics Center was established. The Sino-Russian Mathematics Center is led by Peking University and Moscow State University, and jointly constructed by relevant domestic units and other Russian universities and research institutes such as St. Petersburg University, relying on the "Double First-class" construction alliance in mathematics.

On 2 April 2021, Peking University Nanchang Innovation Research Institute was inaugurated.

On 15 July 2021, Peking University School of Integrated Circuits was inaugurated.

On 6 September 2021, the new Changping campus of Peking University was officially opened, welcoming the first batch of teachers and students. On 30 September, Peking University Lanyuan Centre was officially launched. The first dean of Lanyuan Centre is Ke Yang, Professor of Peking University School of Clinical Oncology and a foreign academician of the American Academy of Medical Sciences. In October, Peking University officially announced the establishment of Peking University School of Computer Science, which means the computer major of Peking University was officially upgraded from a department to a school. Yang Fuqing, Academician of the Chinese Academy of Sciences, served as the honorary president.

In 2022, Peking University and Lancet established a commission on healthy aging in China. The Commission's purpose is to re-focus the debate on aging not just on the risks of China's aging population but on opportunities by "unleashing the intellectual and vocational capacities of the older population and the whole of Chinese society."

In June 2022, the International University Sports Federation (FISU) released the first series of "Healthy Campus" list. Peking University, as the only Chinese university that has obtained platinum certification from the International University Sports Federation, participated in 4 projects and became the only representative from China among 130 projects worldwide.

In March 2025, PKU split its former Faculty of Information and Engineering into two new faculties—Faculty of Informatics and Faculty of Engineering, with the latter having added two newly established schools—School of Advanced Manufacturing and Robotics and School of Mechanics and Engineering Science.

== Campus ==
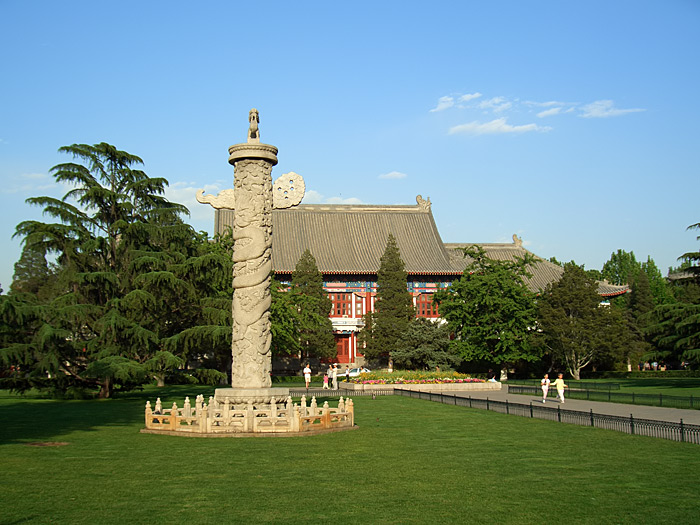
View of the central campus

The university campus is on the former site of Qing dynasty imperial gardens and it retains traditional Chinese-style landscaping, including traditional houses, gardens, pagodas, and notable historical buildings and structures. American architect and art historian Talbot Hamlin designed some of the university's buildings constructed during the 1919 to 1922 period. There are several gates that lead into campus — East, West and South gates, with the West Gate being the most well known for the painted murals on its ceiling. Weiming Lake is in the north of the campus and is surrounded by walking paths and small gardens. The university hosts many museums, such as the Museum of University History and the Arthur M. Sackler Museum of Art and Archaeology. Notable items in these museums include funerary objects that were excavated in Beijing and date back thousands of years from the graves of royals of the Warring States period. There are ritual pottery vessels as well as elaborate pieces of jewelry on display. There are also human bones set up in the traditional burial style of that period.

Beyond its main campus, Peking University Health Science Center (PKUHSC) is on Xueyuan Road, alongside other colleges.

During the Third Front construction, Peking University opened a branch in Hanzhong, Shaanxi.

In 2001, Peking University's Shenzhen campus, the Shenzhen Graduate School, opened its doors. The campus is located in the northwest part of Shenzhen City.

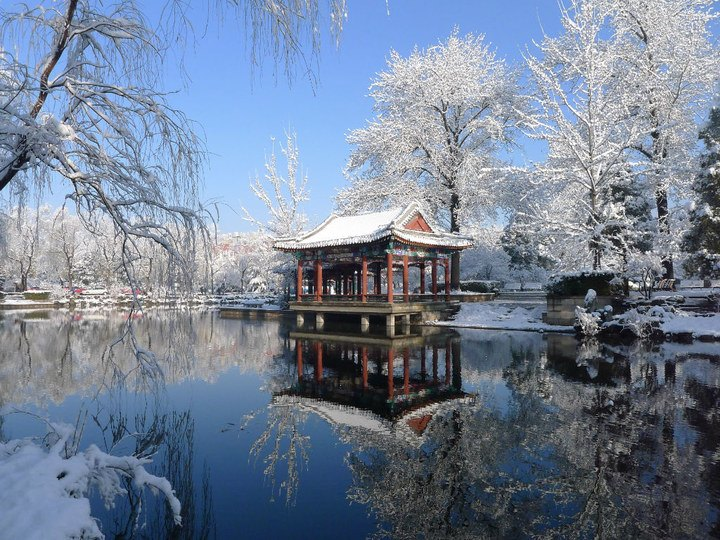
Peking University during winter. The campus is situated on a former imperial garden.

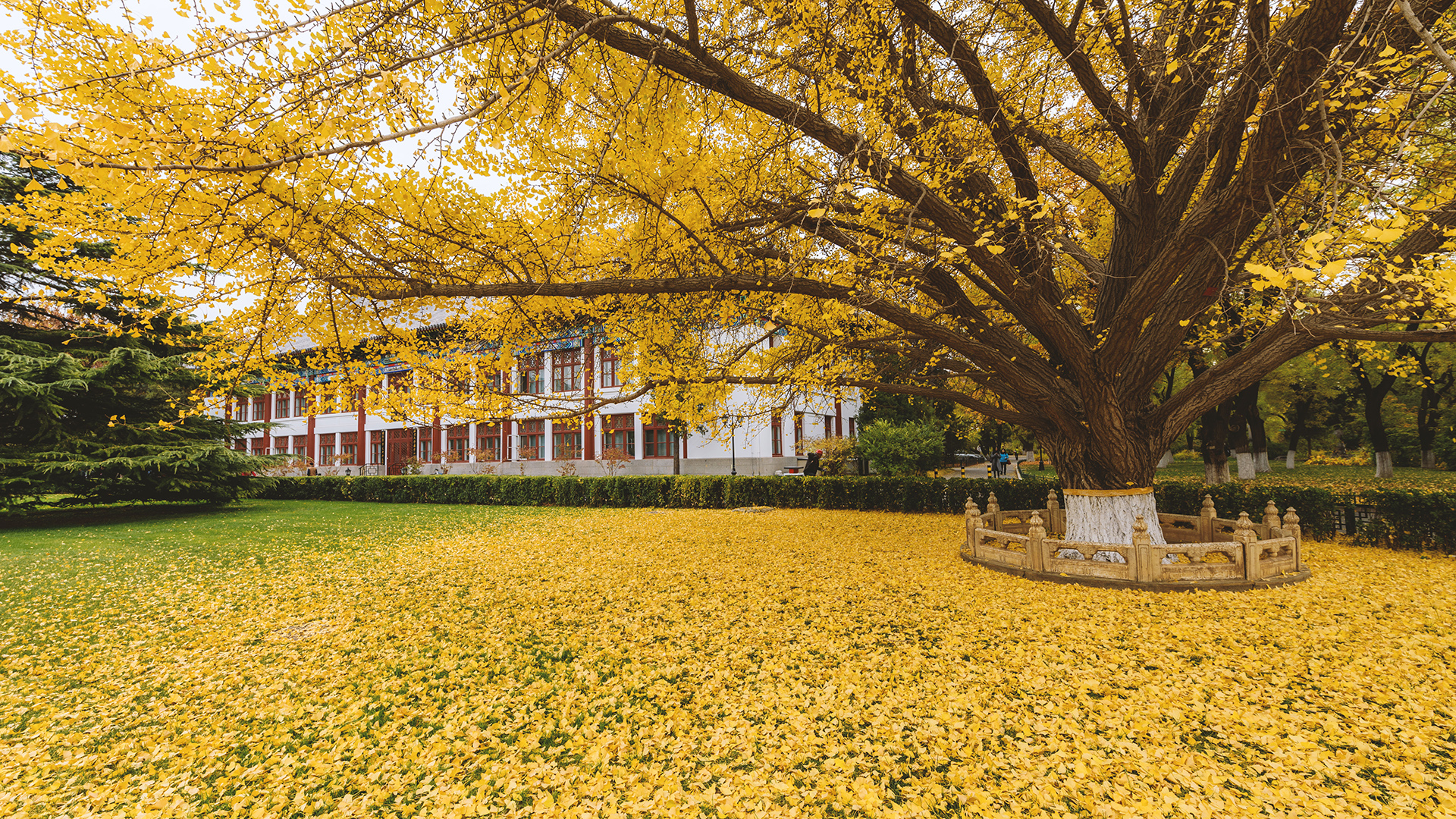
Peking University during the autumn

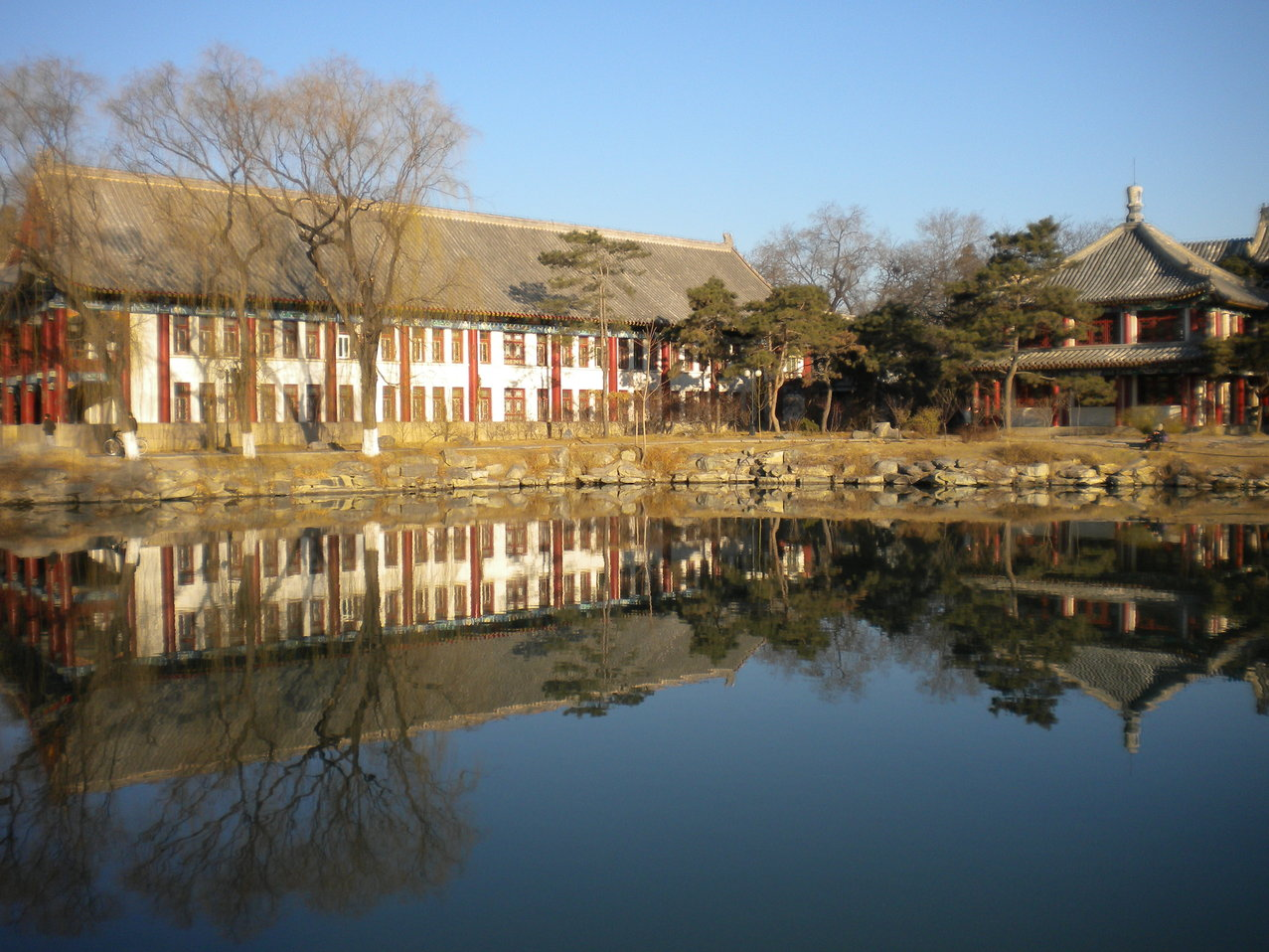
The College of Architecture and Landscape

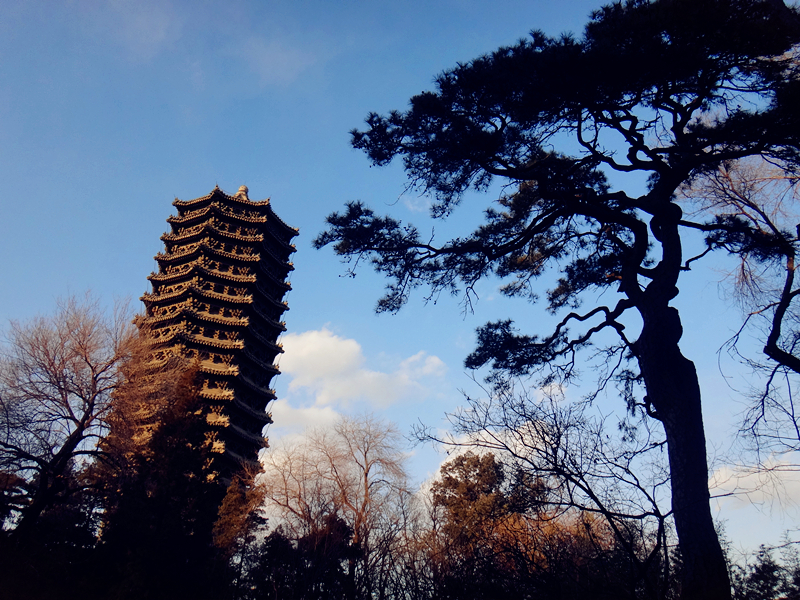
Boya Pagoda

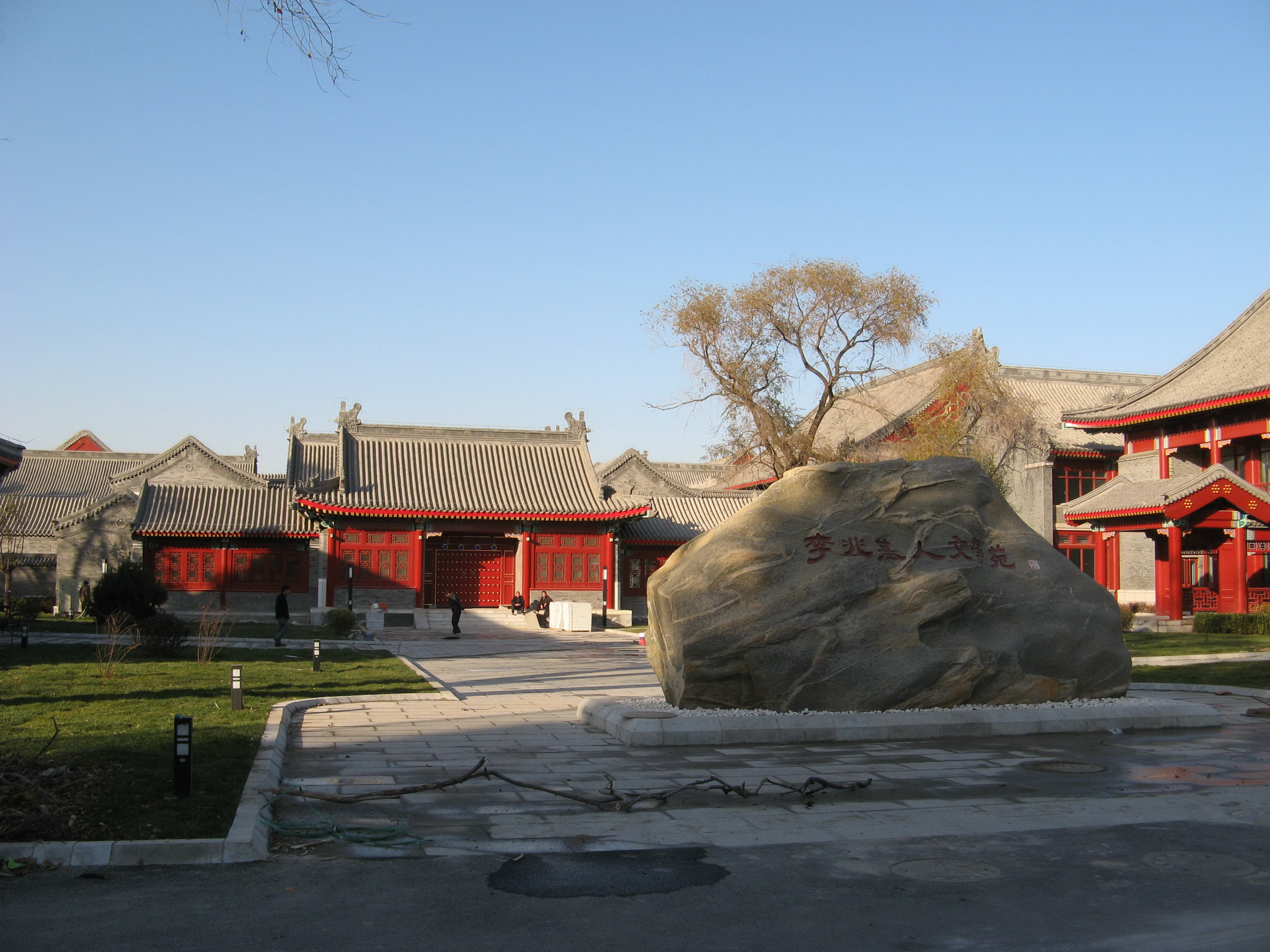
The Humanities Buildings

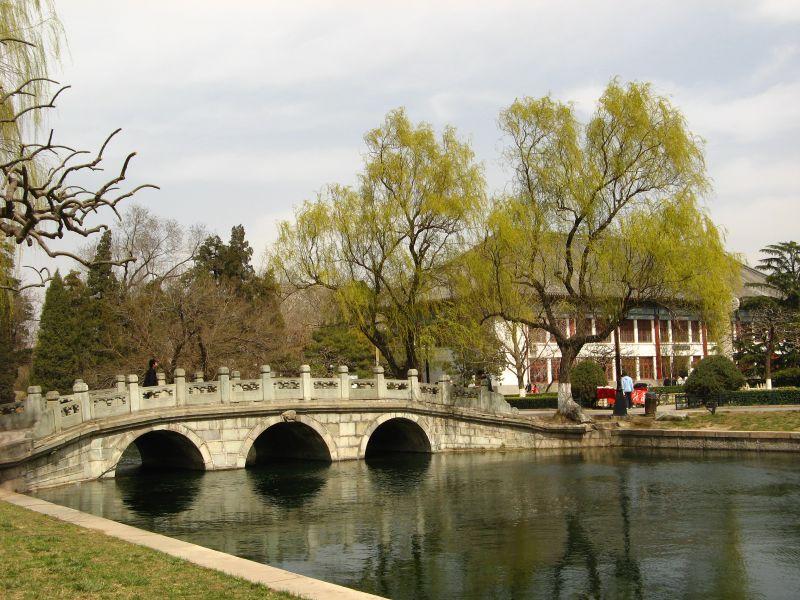
A stone bridge inside the campus

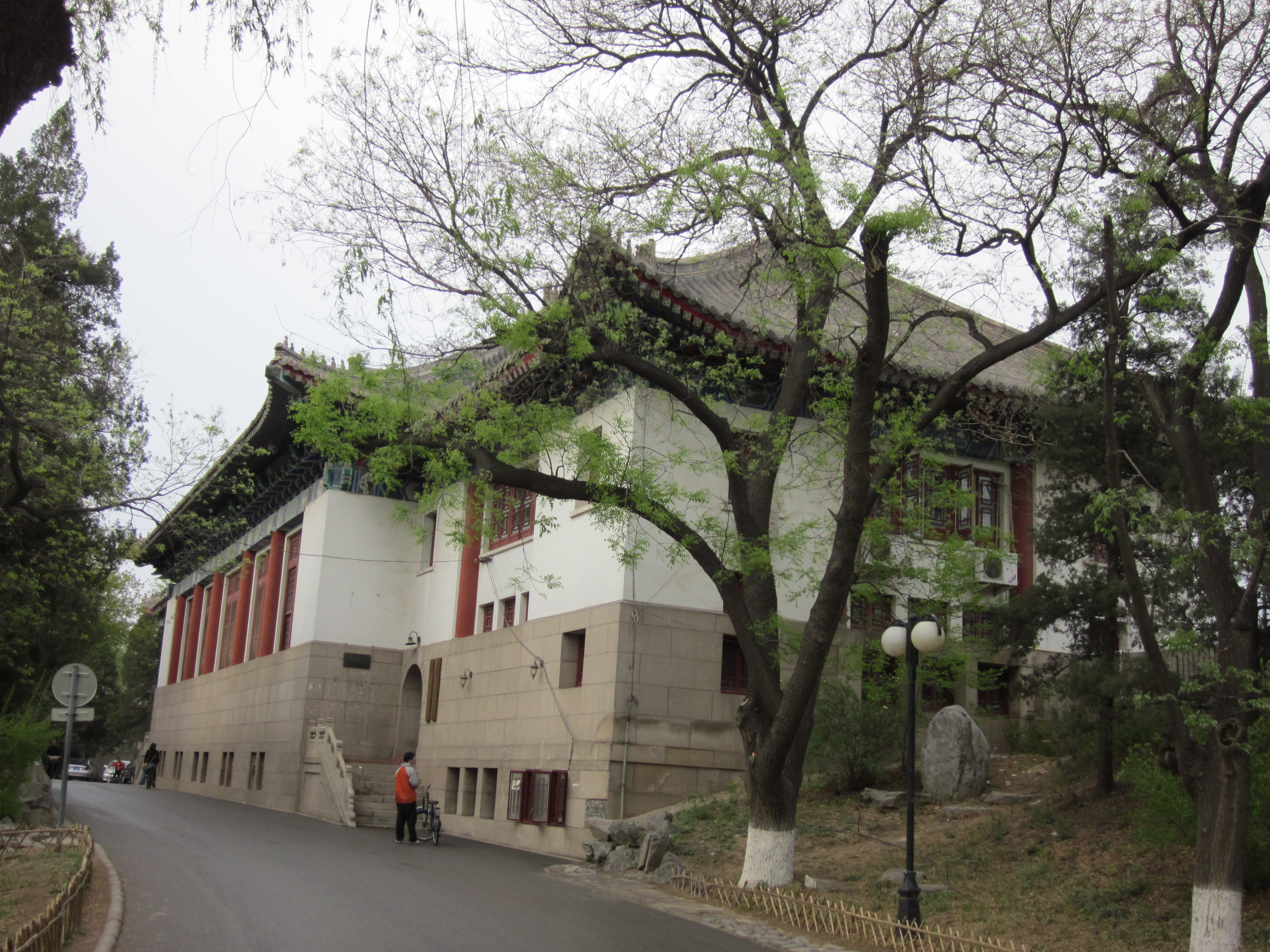
A gymnasium building

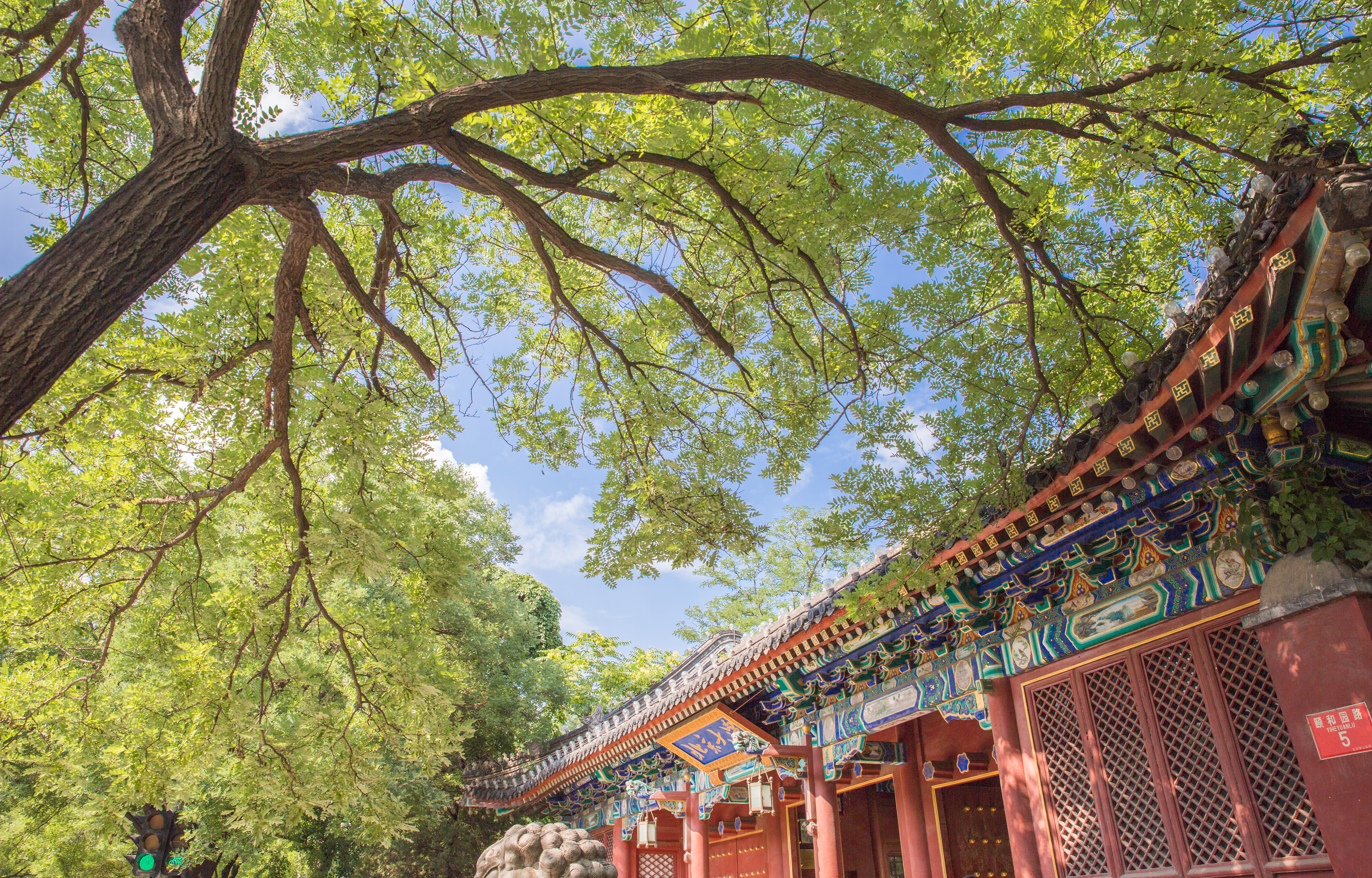
Peking University West Gate

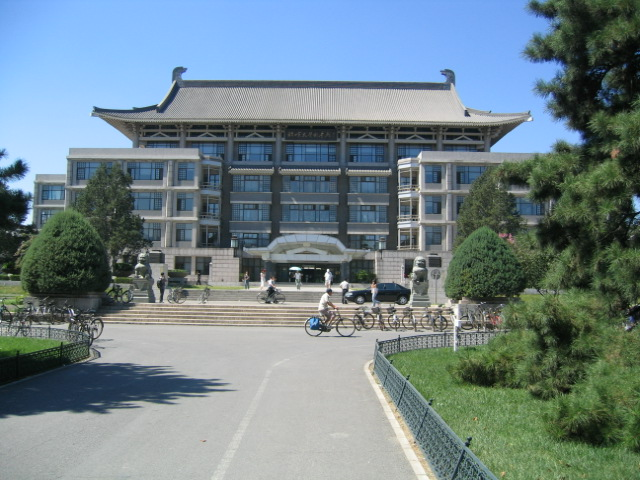
Peking University's Main Library

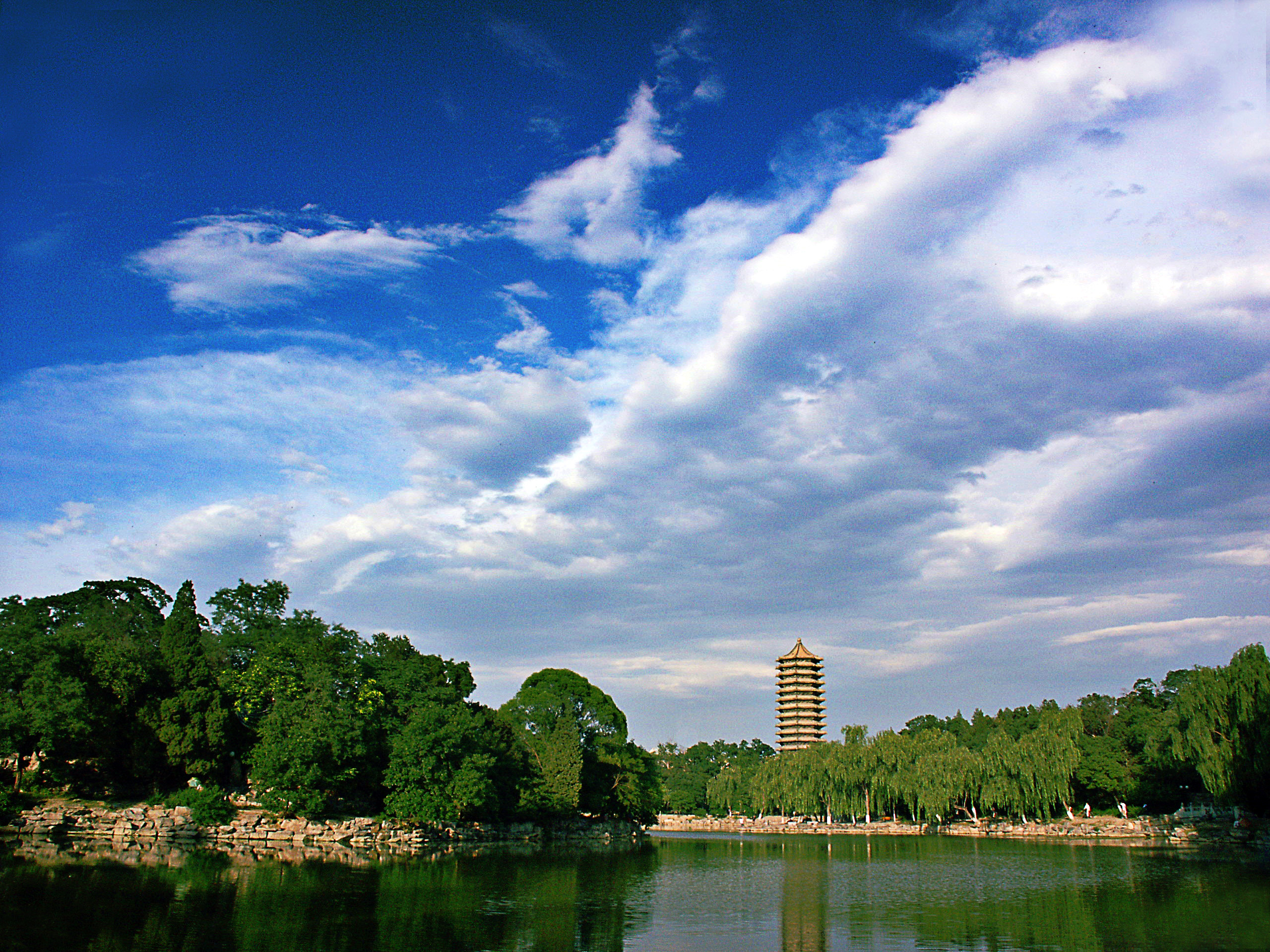
Weiming Lake occupies the central part of the campus of Peking University

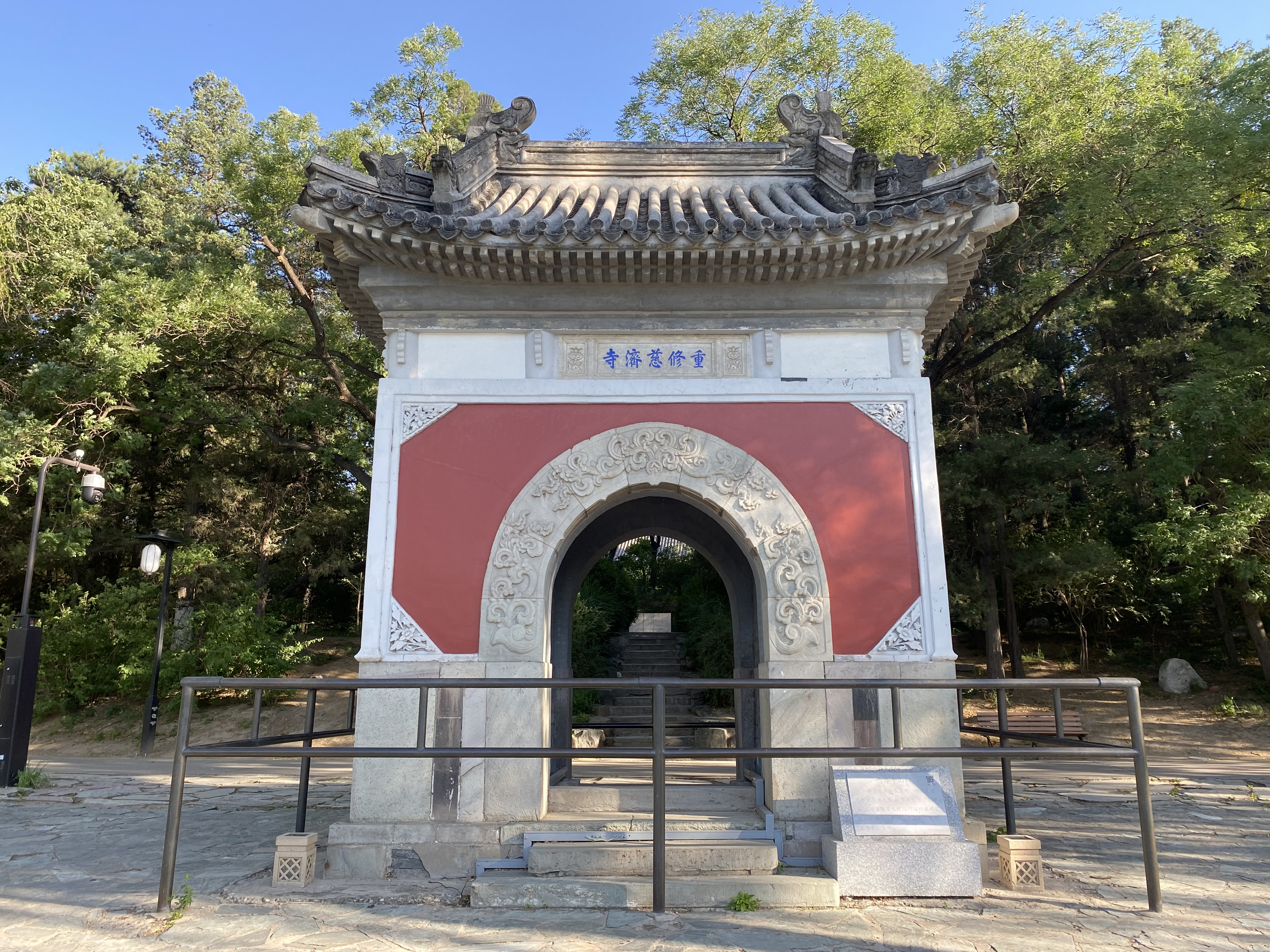
The old site of the Ciji Temple at the Weiming Lake

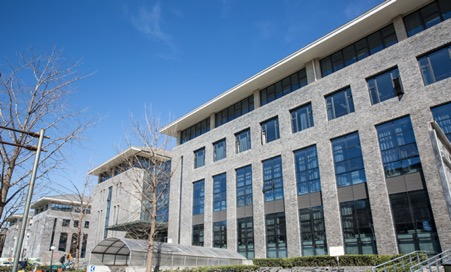
Peking University's Science Teaching Building

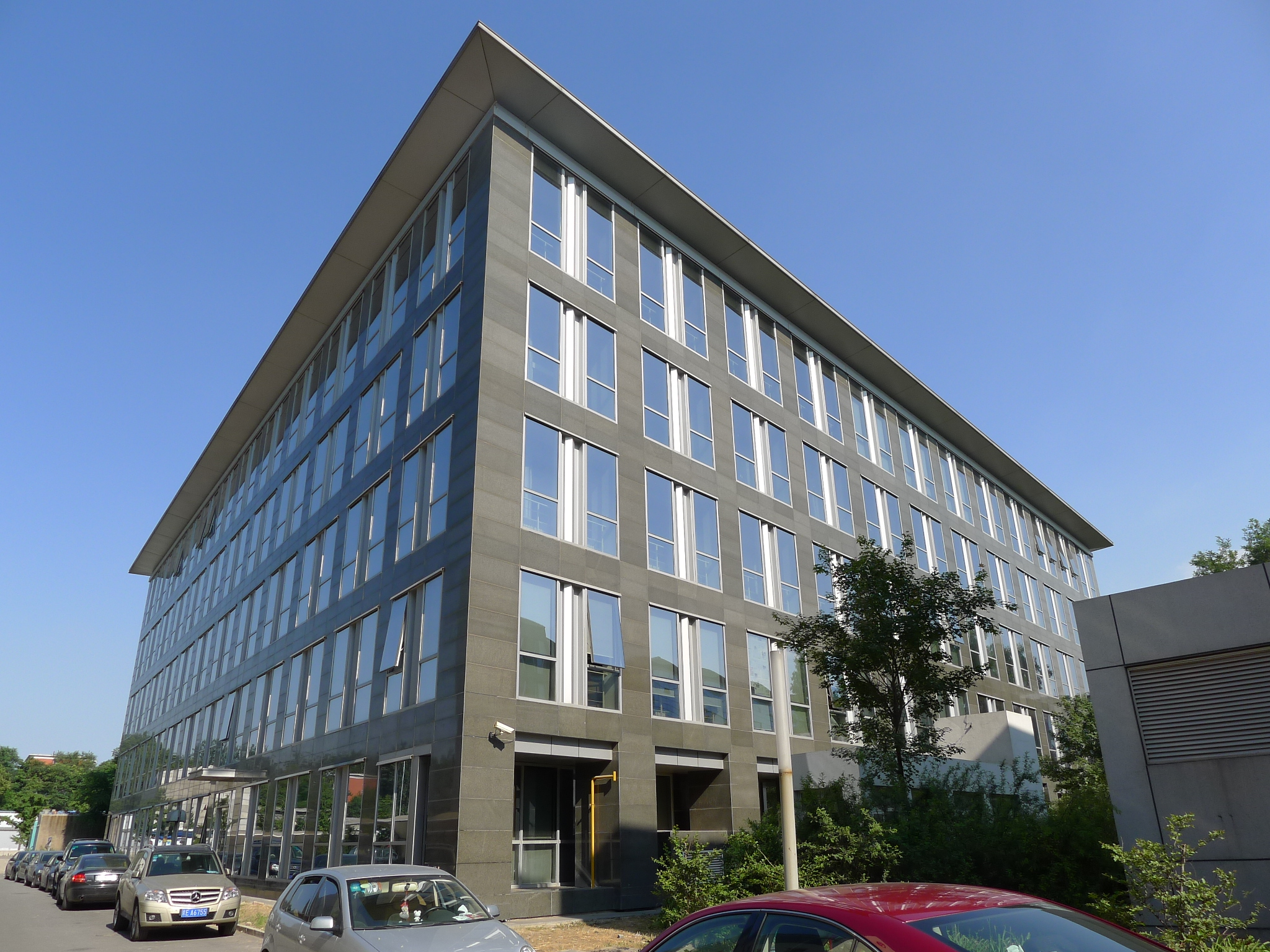
School of International Studies

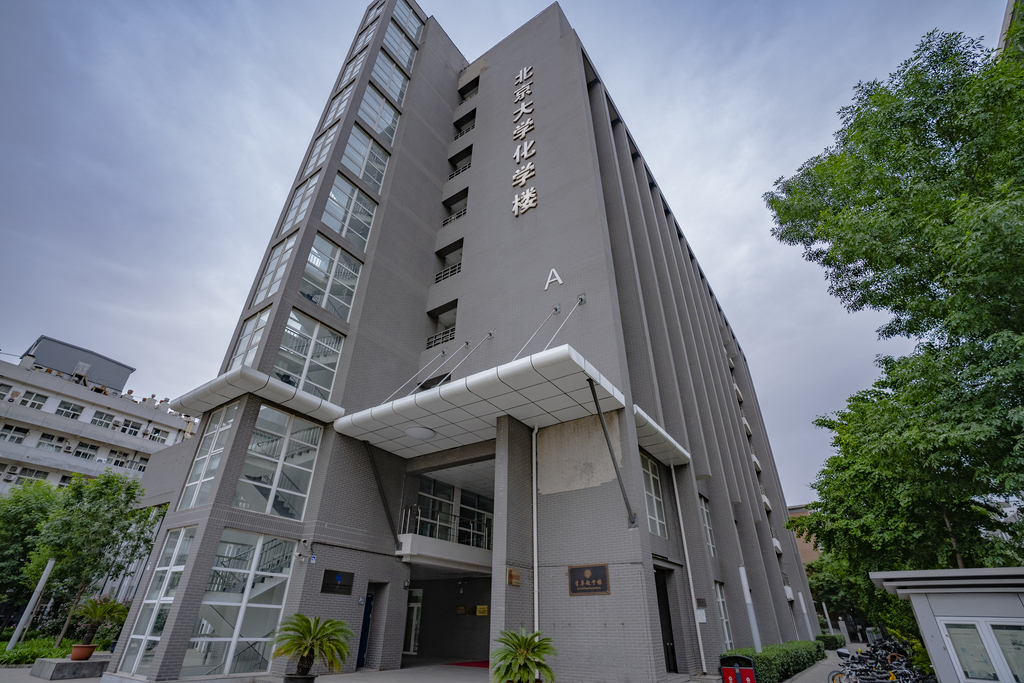
College of Chemistry and Molecular Engineering

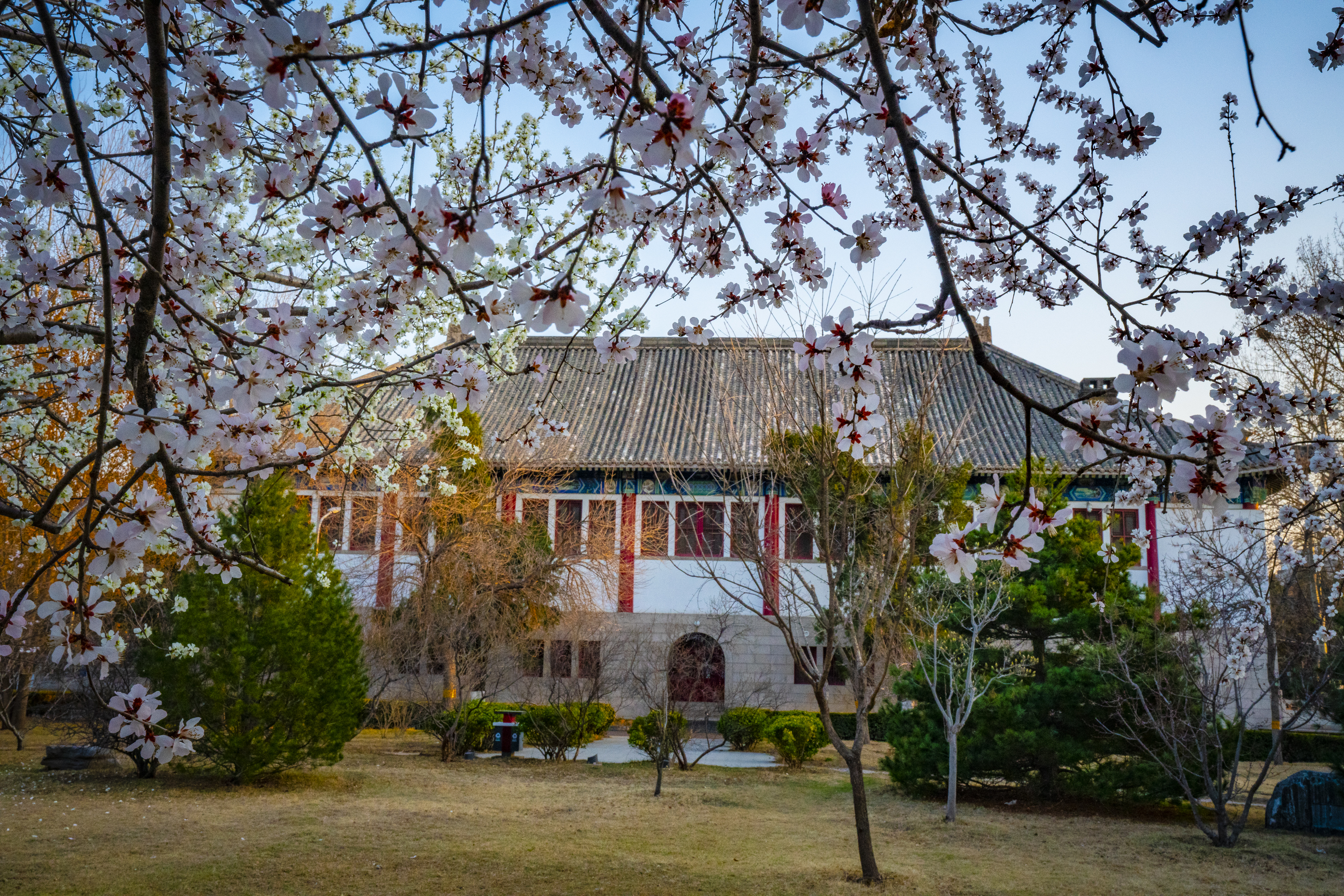
Peking University during the spring

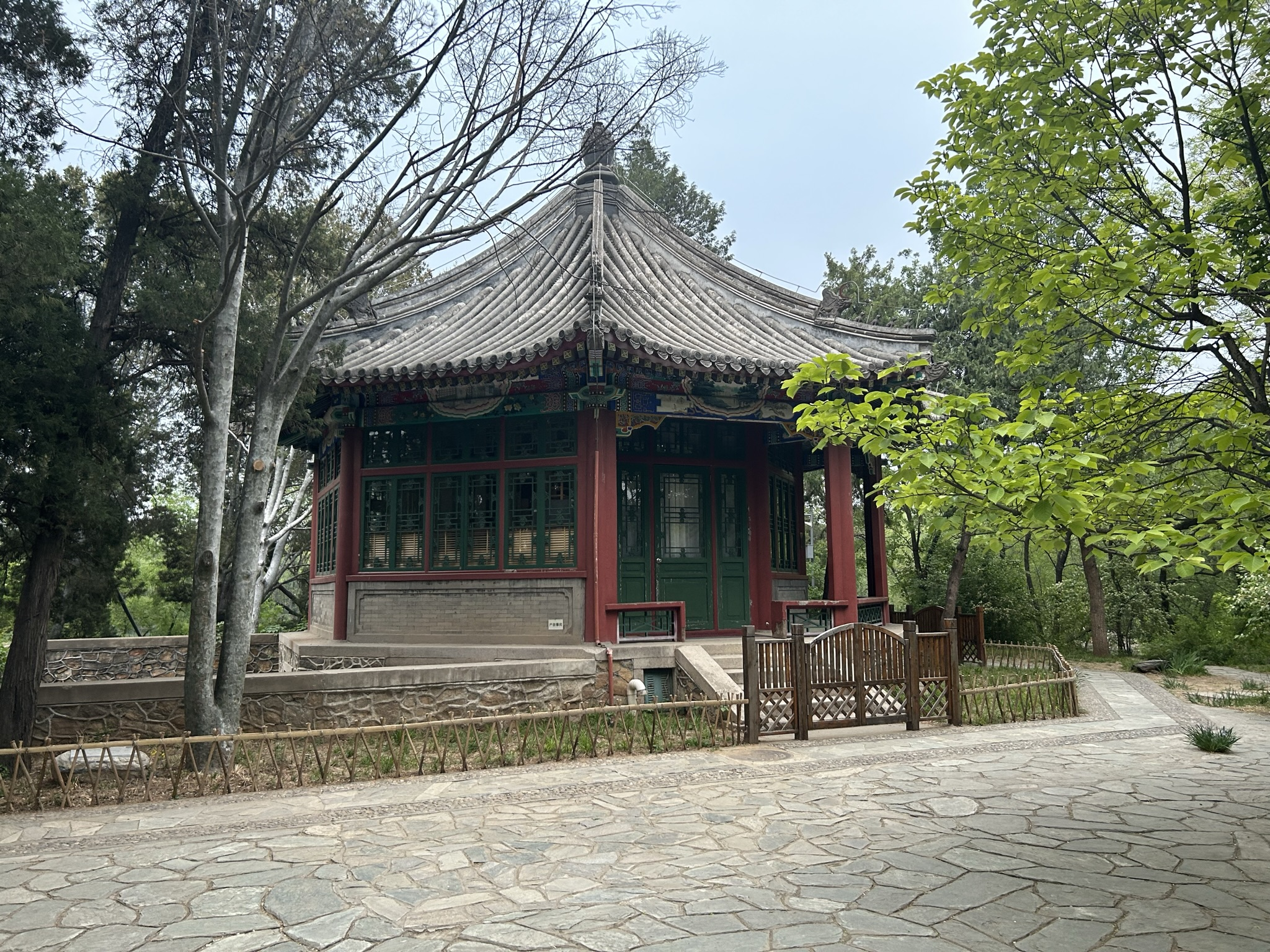
The Daoting, a pavilion on the university campus

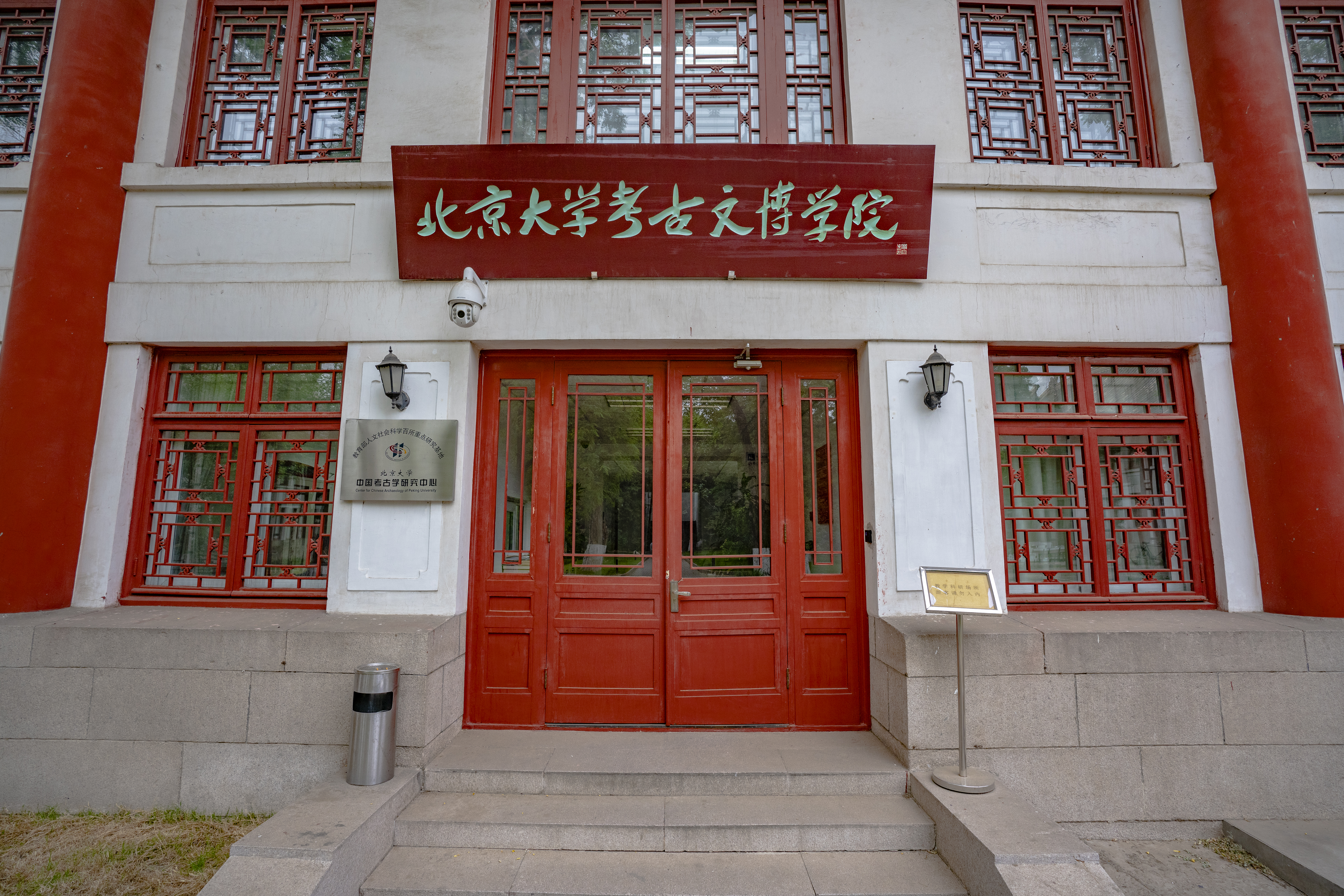
School of Archaeology and Museology

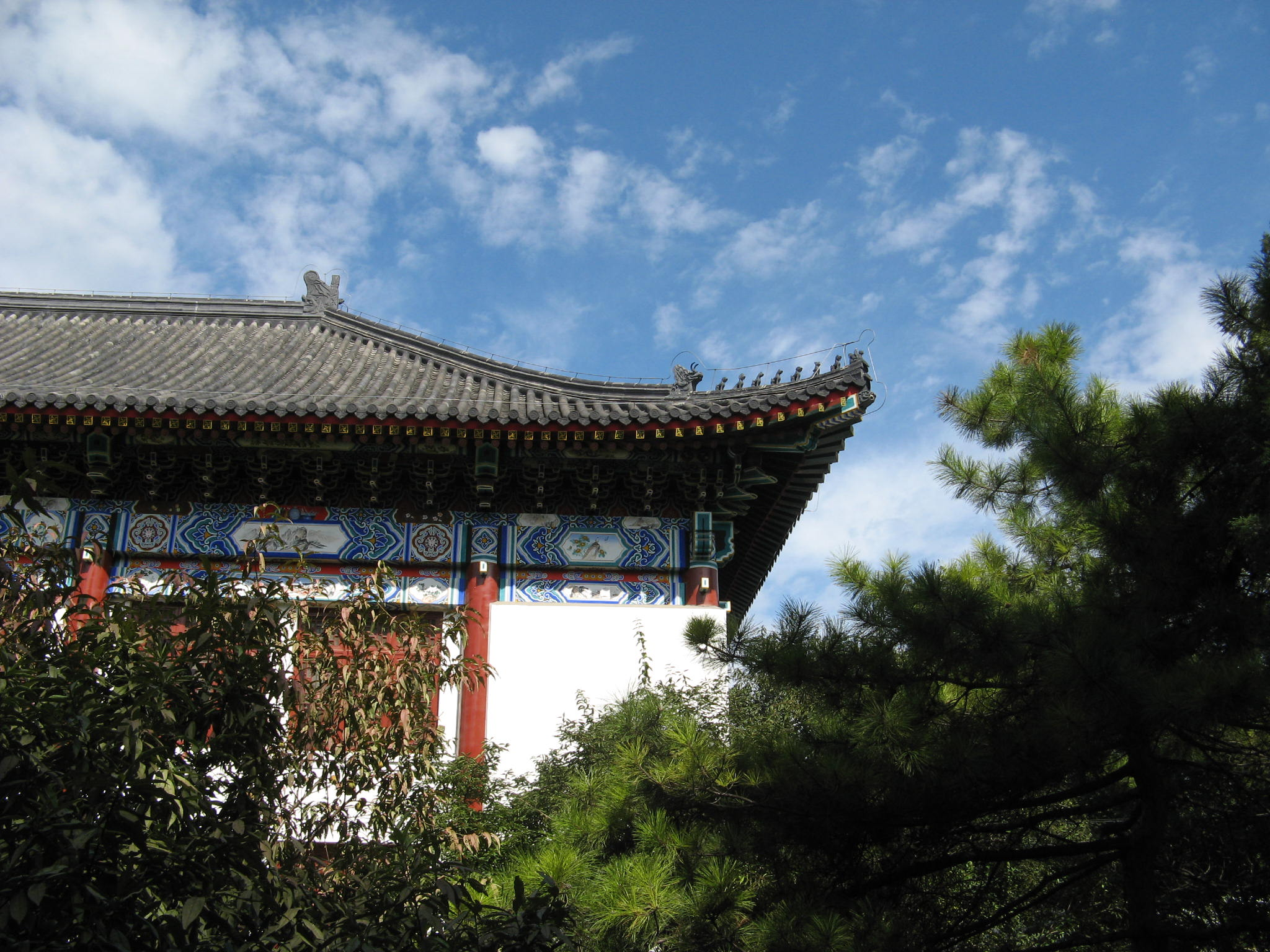
Arthur M. Sackler Museum of Arts and Archaeology

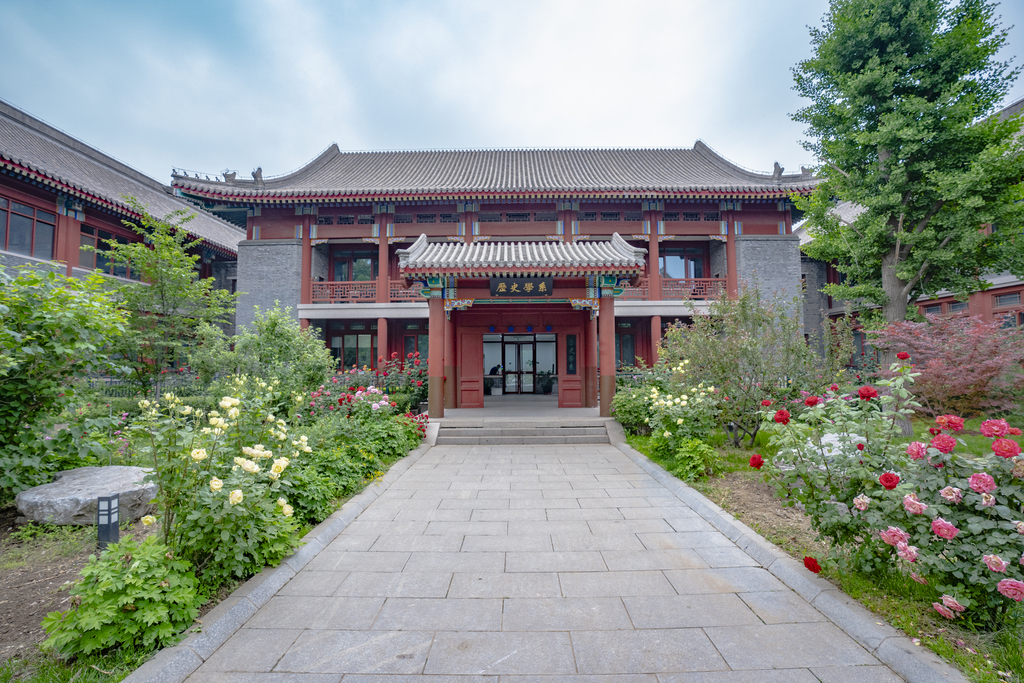
Department of History

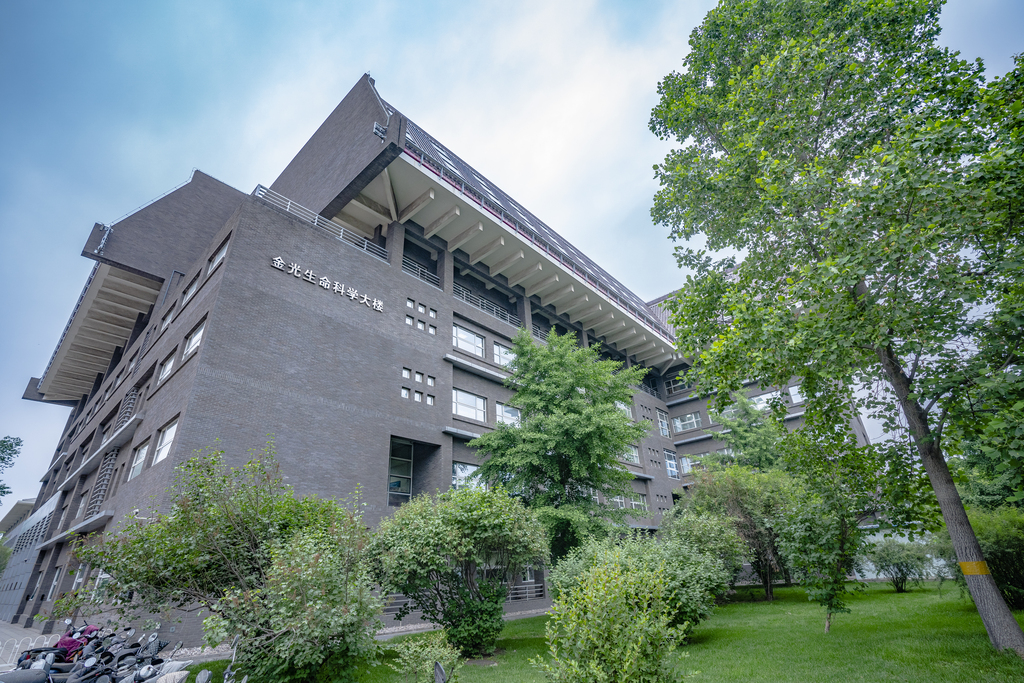
School of Life Sciences

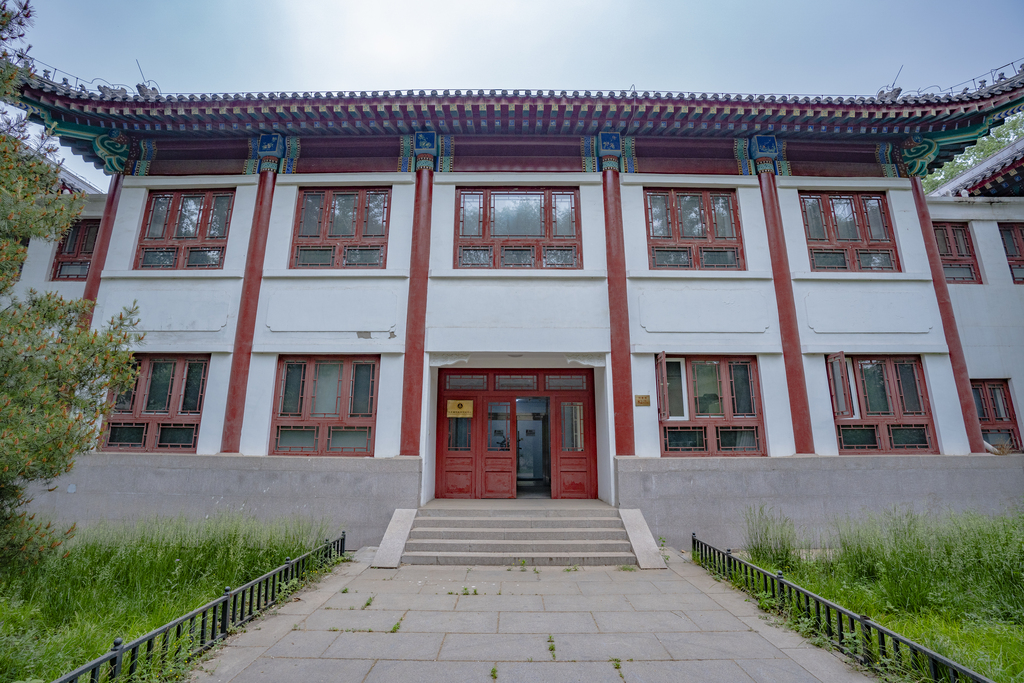
Beijing International Center for Mathematical Research

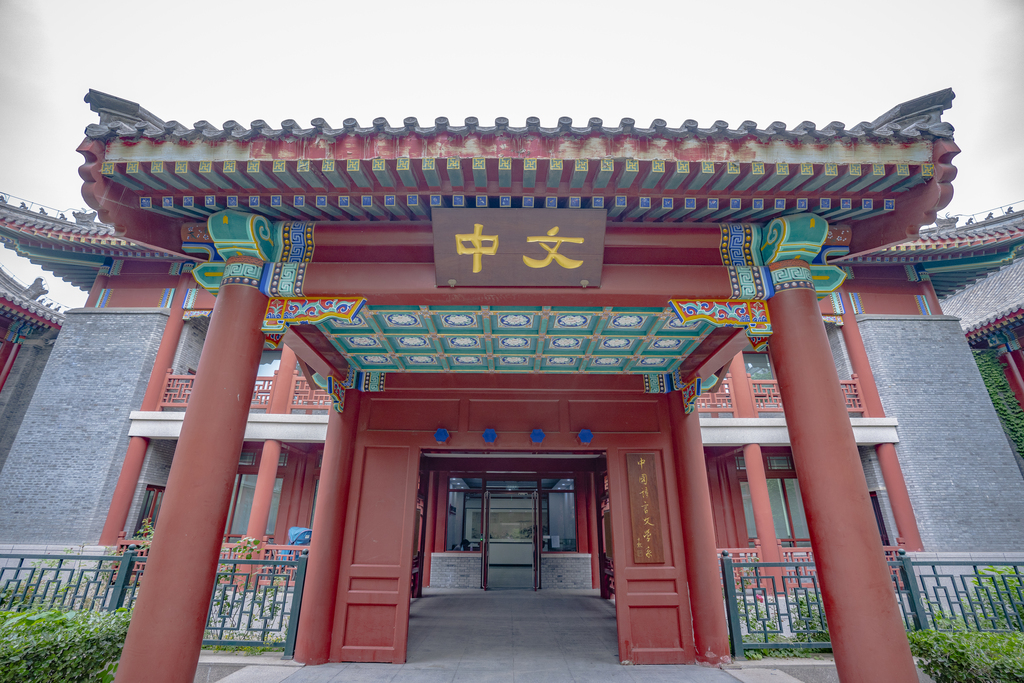
Department of Chinese Language and Literature

== Academics ==
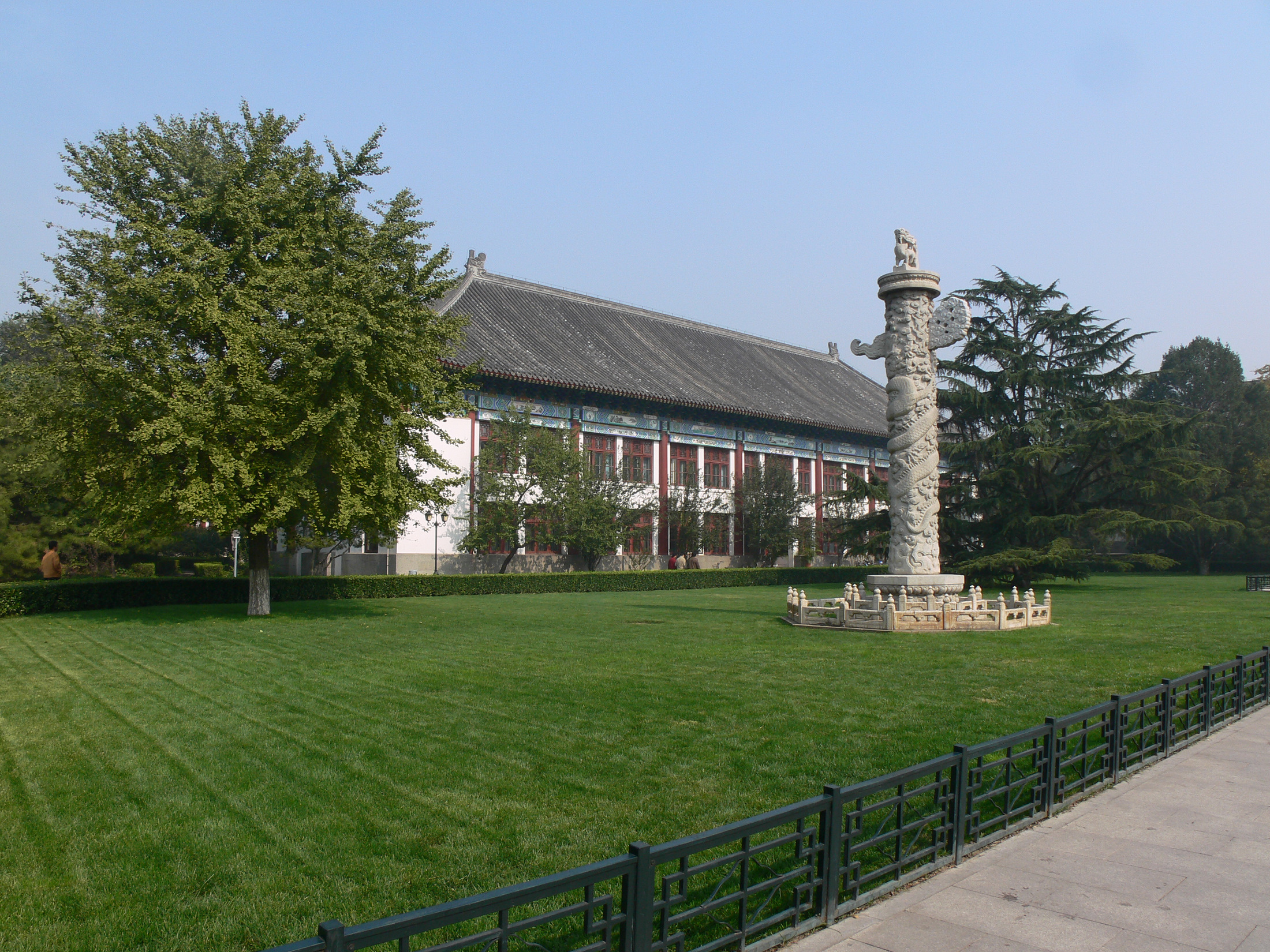
One of the administrative buildings with the huabiao

Peking University consists of 55 schools and departments, with 137 majors for undergraduates, 59 Master's degree programs, and 59 doctoral programs. In addition to basic research, the university also conducts applied research.

At present, Peking University has 420 research institutions, including 7 State Key Laboratories, 5 National Engineering Research Centers, and 1 National Laboratory. With 8 million holdings, the university library is the largest of its kind in Asia.

Peking University, the Georgia Institute of Technology, and Emory University jointly administer the Wallace H. Coulter Department of Biomedical Engineering.

Over the past century, some Peking University alumni have become presidents of other major Chinese universities, including former Tsinghua President Luo Jialun, Renmin University President Yuan Baohua, Zhejiang University President Qian Sanqiang, Fudan University President Zhang Zhirang, Nankai University President Teng Weizao, University of Science and Technology of China President Guan Weiyan and many others.

=== Rankings and reputation ===
==== General rankings ====
University rankings

Global – Overall
- ARWU World: 22
- QS World: 13
- THE World: 13
- THE Reputation: 11
- USNWR Global: 19

Regional – Overall
- ARWU Asia: 2
- QS Asia: 1
- QS BRICS: 2
- THE Asia: 2
- THE Emerging Economies: 1

Several rankings have placed Peking University among the top universities in mainland China. In 2025, QS Asia University Rankings has put it at the top among all Asian universities.

The 2025 QS Rankings ranked Peking University 14th in the world and first in Asia. As of 2025, the Times Higher Education World University Rankings has ranked Peking University 13th in the world and 2nd in Asia, with its teaching and research environment indicators placing 9th and 6th in the world respectively.

The 2023 QS Rankings ranked Peking University 12th in the world and first in Asia. Peking University was also ranked 15th in the world and 1st in the Asia-Pacific in The Three University Missions Ranking. The Academic Ranking of World Universities, also known as the "Shanghai Ranking", placed Peking University 22nd in the world and 2nd in the Asia-Pacific. As of 2026, the U.S. News & World Report ranked Peking University 19th in the world, 3rd in the Asia-Pacific and 2nd in China.

In the Times Higher Education Global Employability University Ranking 2025, an annual ranking of university graduates' employability, Peking University was ranked 11th in the world and 2nd in Asia. In 2025, it ranked 11th in world reputation, according to the THE, and 22 of its subjects ranked in the top 1% in the world, according to Essential Science Indicators, which is an analytics database developed by the British-American company Clarivate that identifies top-performing research and emerging trends within the Web of Science Core Collection. It has also been leading the chart of Times Higher Education BRICS & Emerging Economies since its inception in 2014.

==== Research performance ====
The 2024 CWTS Leiden Ranking ranked Peking University at 13th in the world based on their publications for the time period 2019–2022. For the high quality of research in natural science and health science, Peking University ranked 5th among the leading institutions, and 4th among the leading universities globally in the Nature Index 2025 Research Leaders by Nature Research. In 2024, it ranked 7th among the universities around the world by SCImago Institutions Rankings. In November 2024, Clarivate Analytics ranked Peking University 12th in the world for the most Highly Cited Researchers.

==== Subjects rankings ====
QS World University Rankings by Subject 2024
Subject	Global	National
Arts & Humanities	▲ =22	1
Linguistics	▼21	1
Archaeology	▲13	1
Architecture and Built Environment	▼48	5
Art and Design	51–100	4
Classics and Ancient History	▼10	1
English Language and Literature	▲33	1
History	17	1
Modern Languages	▲9	1
Performing Arts	51–100	2–3
Philosophy	▼51–100	▲1–2
Engineering and Technology	▼33	▲2
Engineering – Chemical	▲ =23	2
Computer Science and Information Systems	▲15	2
Engineering – Electrical and Electronic	▲26	▲2
Engineering – Mechanical	▲25	3
Life Sciences & Medicine	▼ =42	1
Agriculture and Forestry	▲67	▲6
Anatomy and Physiology	▲35	▲1
Biological Sciences	▲28	▼2
Dentistry	▼ =33	2
Medicine	▲36	1
Nursing	51–100	1–4
Pharmacy and Pharmacology	▲23	1
Psychology	▲35	1
Natural Sciences	▲17	▼2
Chemistry	▲14	▼2
Earth and Marine Sciences	▲ =35	▲1–2
Environmental Sciences	15	2
Geography	▼25	1
Geology	▲25	▲1
Geophysics	▲ =25	▲1
Materials Sciences	▼ =17	2
Mathematics	▲23	2
Physics and Astronomy	▲16	2
Social Sciences & Management	▲18	1
Accounting and Finance	▲19	1
Anthropology	51–100	1
Business and Management Studies	▲ =30	▲2
Communication and Media Studies	▼51–100	▲1–2
Economics and Econometrics	▲20	1
Education and Training	▲19	▲2
Law and Legal Studies	▼ =31	1
Library and Information Management	▼33	2
Politics	▲ =39	▲2
Social Policy and Administration	▼51–100	▼2–4
Sociology	▼35	1
Sports–Related Subjects	51–100	1
Statistics and Operational Research	▼35	2

THE World University Rankings by Subject 2024
Subject	Global	National
Arts & humanities	▼28	1
Business & economics	▲10	2
Clinical & health	24	2
Computer science	▲16	2
Education	▼12	▼2
Engineering	▼14	1
Life sciences	▲ =12	▲1–2
Physical sciences	▲15	▼2
Psychology	▲22	1
Social sciences	▲17	▲1

ARWU Global Ranking of Academic Subjects 2023
Subject	Global	National
Natural Sciences
Mathematics	▲28	1
Physics	▲25	3
Chemistry	▲10	▼4
Earth Sciences	▲24	▲4
Geography	76–100	▼6–8
Ecology	▲18	1
Atmospheric Science	▼23	▼5
Engineering
Electrical & Electronic Engineering	51–75	15–26
Automation & Control	51–75	▼21–30
Telecommunication Engineering	▼46	▼23
Biomedical Engineering	▲8	▲5
Computer Science & Engineering	▲13	5
Materials Science & Engineering	▲11	3
Nanoscience & Nanotechnology	4	3
Energy Science & Engineering	▼14	▼9
Environmental Science & Engineering	▲5	▲2
Water Resources	▲24	▼11
Biotechnology	▲29	▼17
Aerospace Engineering	▼44	▼12
Transportation Science & Technology	▲30	20–21
Remote Sensing	▼31	▼16
Metallurgical Engineering	76–100	28–30
Life Sciences
Biological Sciences	▲51–75	2–5
Human Biological Sciences	101–150	▼3–8
Agricultural Sciences	▼76–100	▼22–30
Medical Sciences
Clinical Medicine	201–300	▼7–9
Public Health	▲48	2
Dentistry & Oral Sciences	▼46	4
Nursing	▲51–75	▲9–14
Medical Technology	151–200	▼12–16
Pharmacy & Pharmaceutical Sciences	▲76–100	▼13–16
Social Sciences
Economics	▲37	1
Statistics	▲40	▲2
Political Sciences	201–300	4–13
Sociology	▲76–100	2
Education	▲101–150	▲8–10
Psychology	▲151–200	5–7
Business Administration	101–150	8–15
Finance	▲46	▼9
Management	76–100	11–18
Public Administration	101–150	4–8
Library & Information Science	▲33	▲9

=== List of schools ===
Faculty of Sciences
School of Mathematical Sciences	School of Physics	College of Chemistry and Molecular Engineering	School of Life Sciences
College of Urban and Environmental Sciences	School of Earth and Space Sciences	School of Psychological and Cognitive Sciences	College of Architecture and Landscape Architecture
Faculty of Information and Engineering
School of Electronics Engineering and Computer Science	College of Engineering	Institute of Computer Science and Technology	School of Software and Microelectronics
College of Environmental Sciences and Engineering	National Engineering Research Center for Software Engineering*	Wangxuan Institute of Computer Technology	School of Materials Science and Engineering
College of Future Technology			
Faculty of Humanities
Department of Chinese Language and Literature*	Department of History	School of Archaeology and Museology	Department of Philosophy and Religious Studies
School of Foreign Languages	School of Arts	School of Chinese as a Second Language	Academy of Opera
Faculty of Social Sciences
School of International Studies	Law School	Department of Information Management	Department of Sociology
School of Government	School of Marxism	Graduate School of Education	School of Journalism and Communication
Department of PE			
Faculty of Economics and Management
School of Economics	Guanghua School of Management	Institute of Population Research	National School of Development
Peking University Health Science Center
School of Basic Medical Sciences	School of Pharmaceutical Sciences	School of Public Health	School of Nursing
School of Health Humanities	School of Continuing Medical Education*	Peking University First Hospital	Peking University People's Hospital
Peking University Third Hospital	Peking University Hospital of Stomatology	Peking University Sixth Hospital	Peking University Cancer Hospital
Peking University Shenzhen Hospital	Peking University Shougang Hospital	Peking University International Hospital	Peking University BinHai Hospital
Interdisciplinary
Yuanpei College (undergraduate liberal arts)	Yenching Academy	Academy for Advanced Interdisciplinary Studies	Institute of Molecular Medicine
The Kavli Institute for Astronomy and Astrophysics	Institute of Nuclear Sciences and Technology	Beijing International Center for Mathematical Research	School of Advanced Agricultural Sciences
Shenzhen Graduate School
School of Transnational Law	HSBC Business School	School of Environment and Energy*	School of Urban Planning and Design
School of Advanced Materials	School School of Chemical Biology and Biotechnology	School of Electronic and Computer EngineeringSchool of Tra	School of Humanities and Social Sciences
School for AI Science			

=== Library ===
On 24 October 2018, Peking University Library, the largest library among Asian universities, held the opening ceremony of the 120th anniversary at the Yingjie Overseas Exchange Center.

=== National School of Development ===
The National School of Development (formerly China Center for Economic Research) is ranked amongst the top five most influential think tanks in China.

In 1998, Justin Yifu Lin et al. jointly founded the Beijing International MBA at Peking University (BiMBA), which is ranked among the top six MBA programs by Quacquarelli Symonds in its TopMBA ranking of the best MBA programs in Asia Pacific for the year 2014–2015. BiMBA has also been ranked as the second most valuable full-time MBA in China by Forbes (after CEIBS) and among Asia's best business schools by Bloomberg Business.

=== Shenzhen Graduate School ===
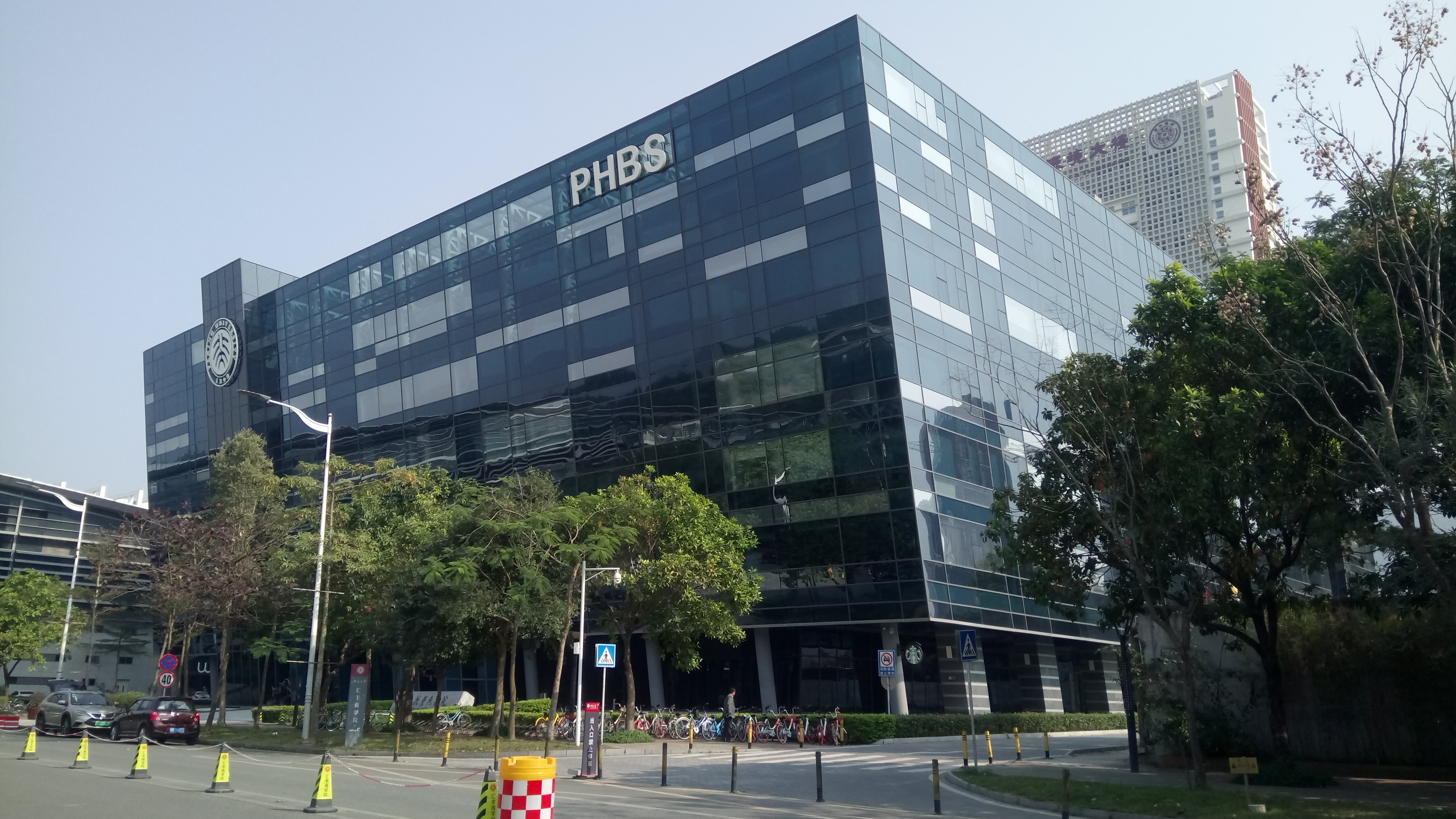
Peking University HSBC Business School at its Shenzhen campus.

Peking University Shenzhen Graduate School is a satellite campus of Peking University located in Shenzhen, Guangdong. It was founded in September 2001 in collaboration with the Shenzhen Municipal Government and is located in University Town of Shenzhen along with Tsinghua University Shenzhen International Graduate School and Harbin Institute of Technology (Shenzhen) campus. Dr. Wen Hai, a renowned economist in China and the vice-president of Peking University is the present chancellor of PKU Shenzhen. The graduate school houses several research schools including, Peking University HSBC Business School and Peking University School of Transnational Law.

On 29 August 2016, Peking University signed a strategic agreement with the Shenzhen Municipal Government to further develop its Shenzhen Graduate School, the university plans build a brand new campus near the existed graduate school and open undergraduate programs.

=== International cooperation ===
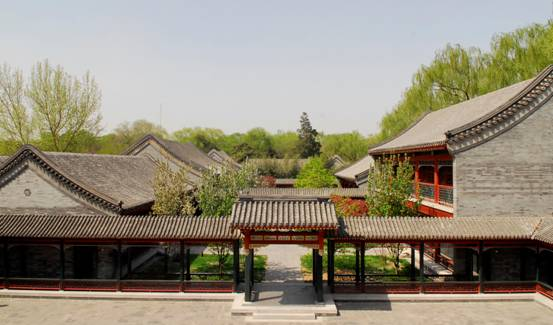
The Langrun Garden, located in the north-eastern area of the university, is the home of the Beijing International MBA at Peking University

Every year, there are approximately 7,000 international students studying at Peking University.

Peking University offers dual degree programs at the bachelor's, master's, and doctoral levels with the renowned Waseda University (早稲田大学) in Northeast Asia. It is one of the most engaged partners with Waseda, having established a strong cooperative relationship of the highest level. This partnership began with an academic agreement in 1982, enhancing dual degree programs and joint research initiatives since 2003. Under the PKU-Waseda project, each year, the university selects undergraduates to spend their third year studying at Waseda University in Japan, and then they return to Peking University for their fourth year. Simultaneously, Waseda University sends numerous students to Peking University as exchange students. Upon graduation, students receive two bachelor's degrees, one from each university. Additionally, joint master's student training programs and dual doctoral degree programs with Waseda University are also in operation. The comprehensive collaboration of offering dual degrees at all bachelor's, master's, and doctoral levels, as seen in the Peking-Waseda partnership, is rare on a global scale.

The dormitories for international students at the main campus are located at Shaoyuan Garden (勺园) and Zhongguanyuan Global Village (中关新园). Its international students are made up of students from most countries in the world including most of Western Europe, North America, and South America, Asia, Australia and many countries in Africa. In 2005, Peking University and Cornell University signed an agreement formally establishing the China and Asia-Pacific Studies major at Cornell, which requires students to spend a semester studying at Peking University while working at internships. In 2006, PKU launched a joint undergraduate program with Yale University in which students will spend a semester overseas, living and studying together with the host institute's students. PKU's School of International Studies also launched joint degree programs with London School of Economics, Paris School of International Affairs, Seoul National University, and the University of Tokyo. PKU also has a longstanding relationship with Stanford University which operates a joint research center and base for Stanford students and scholars at the Stanford Center at Peking University, located in the Lee Jung Sen Building. The Peking University HSBC Business School has joint degree programs with University of Hong Kong and Chinese University of Hong Kong. The university has maintained a partnership with the Freie Universität Berlin since 1981 and the Higher School of Economics since 2015, and in 2019, became a partner of Washington University in St. Louis through the McDonnell International Scholars Academy.

=== Global excellence strategy ===
On the 121st founding anniversary, Peking University unveiled the "Global Excellence Strategy", an international blueprint aiming to enhance Peking University's global presence during the "Fourth Industrial Revolution". The "Global Excellence Strategy" aims to strengthen international cooperation, overcome development barriers, gather global resources, and stimulate collegial relationships. The Global Excellence Strategy is based upon the English word "CLOUDS", representing the "cloud era" of the "Fourth Industrial Revolution". Each letter stands for a corresponding word, namely creativity, leadership, openness, uniqueness, diversity and shaping.

=== Art research ===
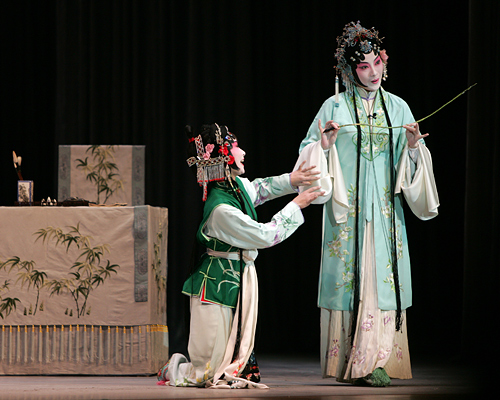
A performance of Kunqu at Peking University

Peking University has participated in many joint art-research projects, such as the Center for the Art of East Asia (CAEA) with the University of Chicago, and Department of Digital Art and Design with UNESCO.

== Notable people ==
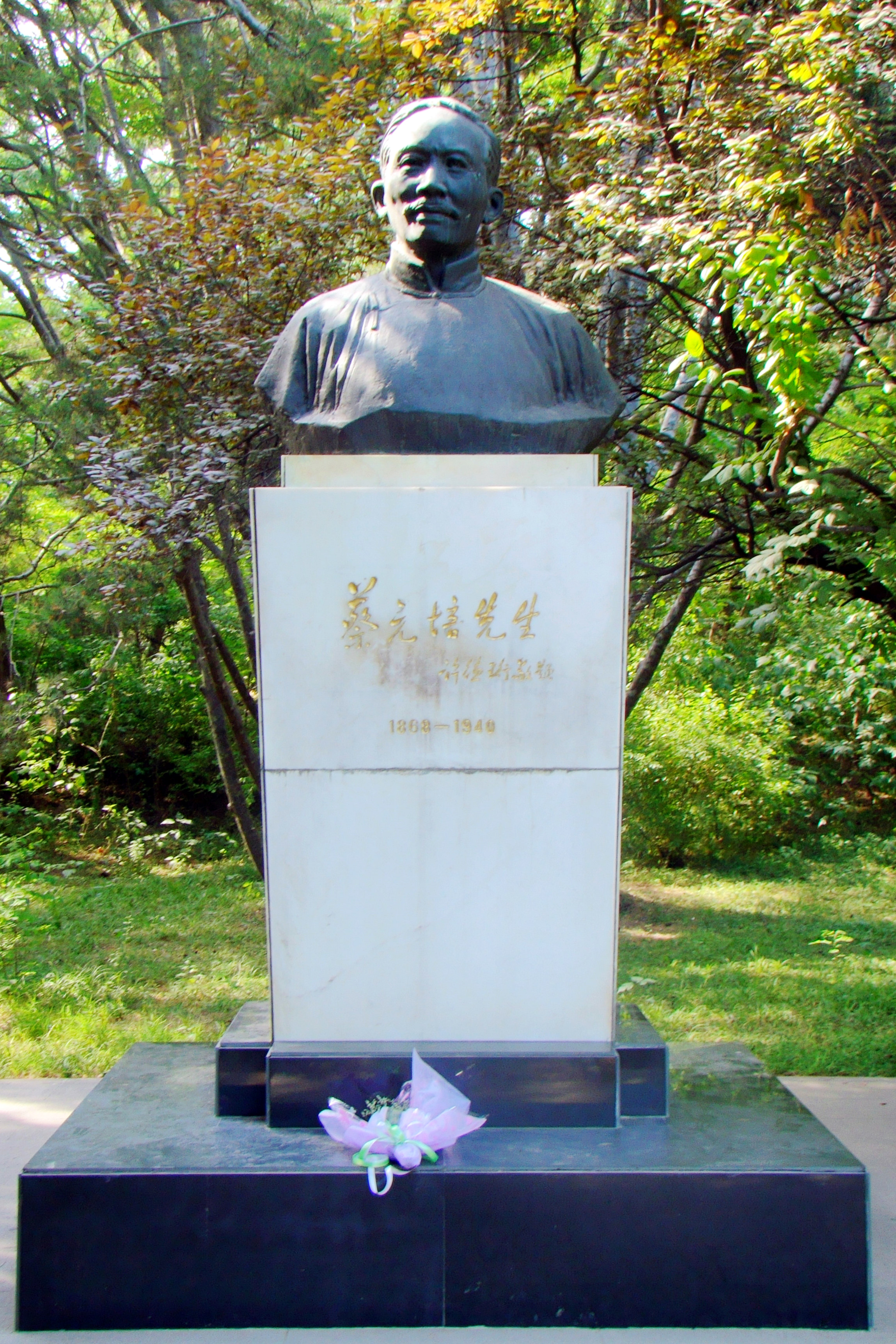
Statue of Cai Yuanpei on Peking University's campus

=== Notable alumni ===
Notable alumni include the current chairman of the Standing Committee of the National People's Congress and the third-ranking member of the CCP Politburo Standing Committee Zhao Leji. Other alumni in politics include former premier of China Li Keqiang, former vice premier of China Hu Chunhua, former minister of Education, Chen Baosheng; current Chief Executive of Macao, Sam Hou Fai; former minister of Natural resources, Wang Guanghua; current Minister of the United Front Work Department, Shi Taifeng, former Governor of the People's Bank of China, Yi Gang, former Interpol-president, Meng Hongwei, and former minister of commerce and Communist Party Secretary of Chongqing, Bo Xilai.

Notable alumni in the sciences include Nobel laureate Tu Youyou recognized for her discovery of artemisinin and dihydroartemisinin for treatment of malaria, Fields Medal laureates Hong Wang and Yu Deng, nuclear physicists and contributors to Chinese nuclear weapons program Qian Sanqiang and Deng Jiaxian, and "father of the Chinese hydrogen bomb" physicist Yu Min, nuclear physicist Zhu Guangya, particle physicist and discoverer of the partial conservation of the axial current, Zhou Guangzhao; mathematician and MacArthur Fellow Yitang Zhang, neurosurgeon Wang Zhongcheng, pulmonologist and recipient of the Medal of the Republic, Zhong Nanshan, and chief economist of the World Bank, Justin Yifu Lin.

Notable alumni in the humanities and arts include author Lu Xun, philosopher and essayist Hu Shih, polymath Lin Yutang, philosopher Liang Shuming, Zhang Shenfu, Qing-dynasty educator Gu Hongming, anthropologist Fei Xiaotong, translator Li Bulou, computer scientist Wang Xuan, and author Jin Yong. Notable international alumni include emeritus professor and linguist Michael Halliday, author Julia Ebner, and philosopher Professor Li Chenyang.

Notable alumni in business include co-founder and CEO of Baidu, billionaire Robin Li, and cryptocurrency entrepreneur Justin Sun.

Other notable alumni include chess grandmaster, four-time Women's World Chess Champion, and Rhodes Scholar Hou Yifan.

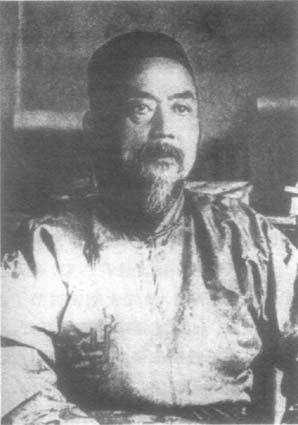
Gu Hongming, translator and educator.

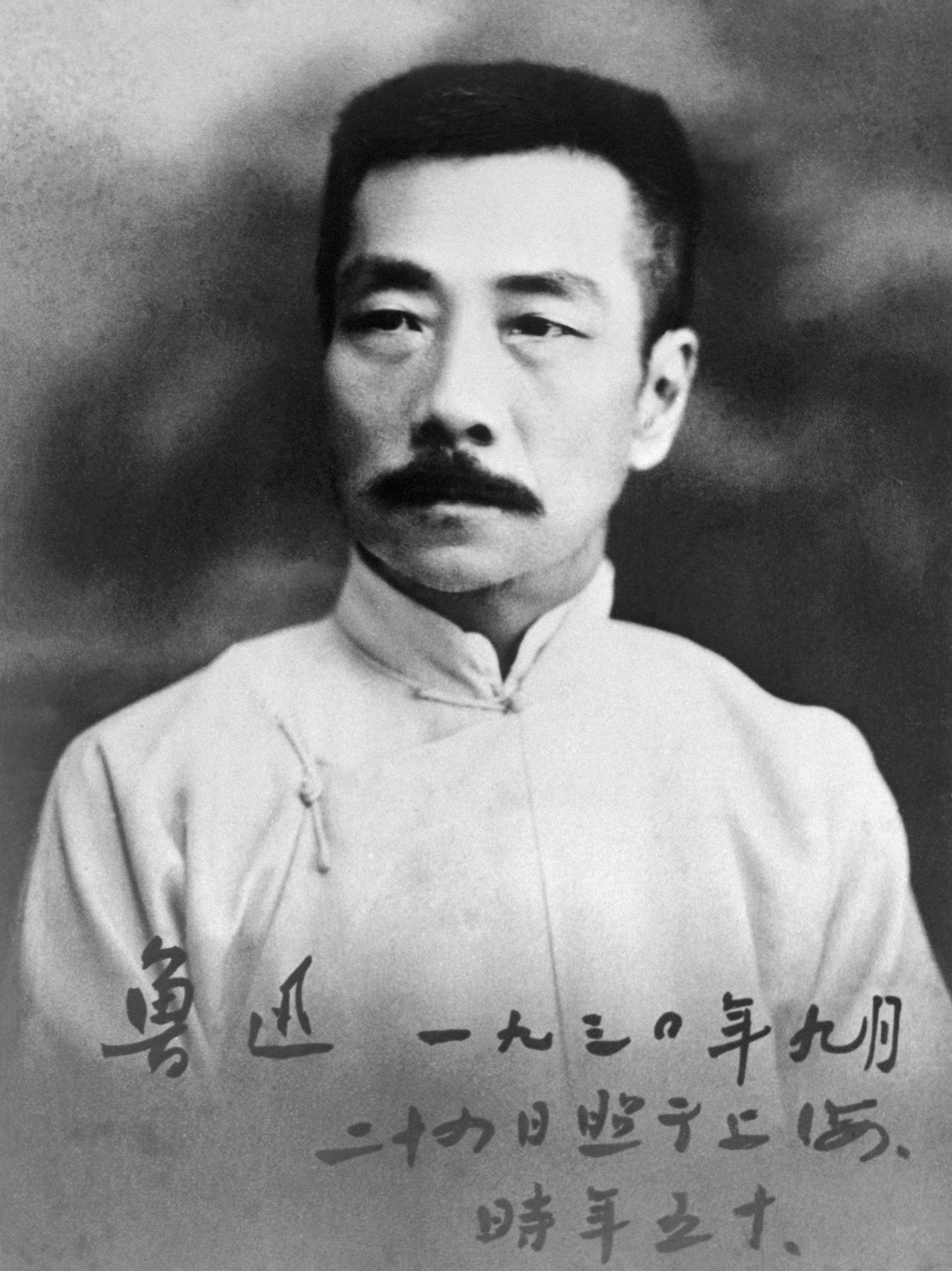
Lu Xun, leading figure of modern Chinese literature.

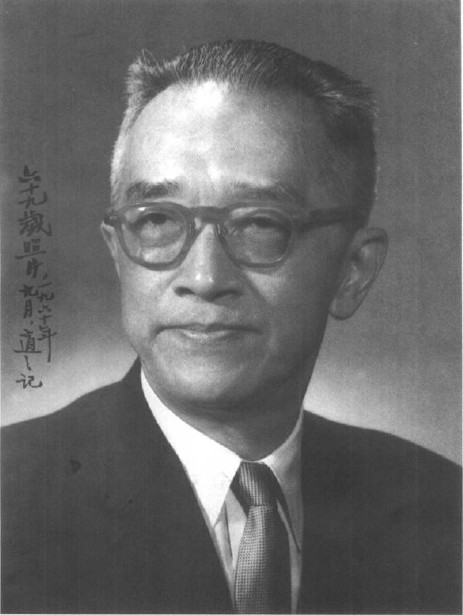
Hu Shih, influential Chinese philosopher and essayist.

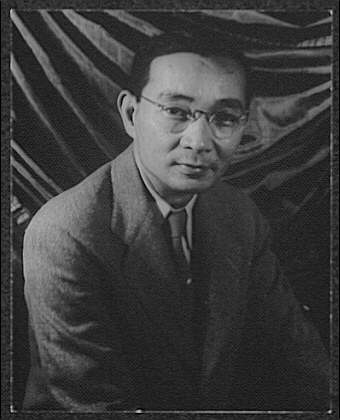
Lin Yutang, Chinese writer, linguist, inventor, and translator.

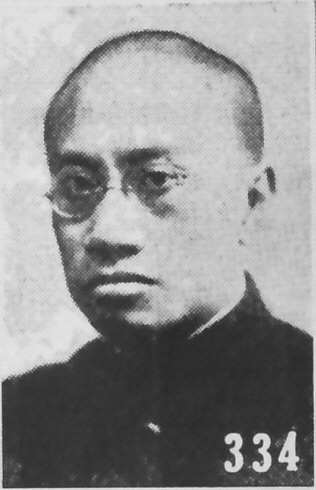
Liang Shuming, philosopher.

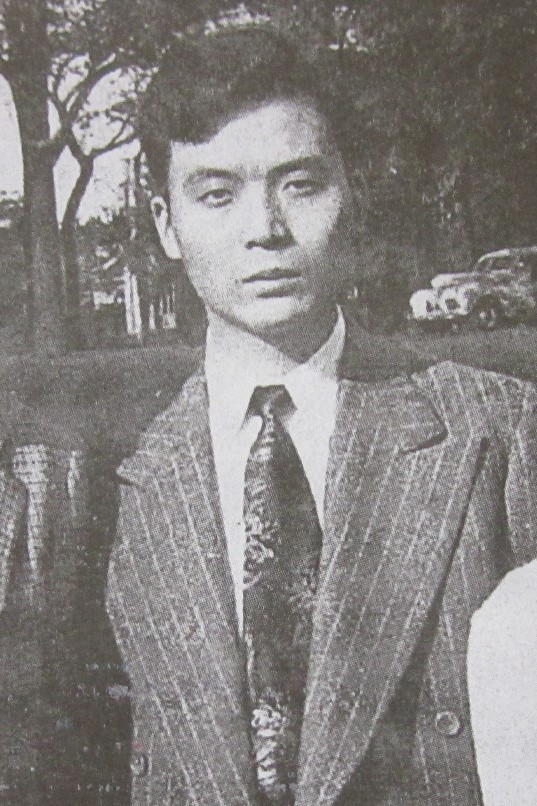
Nuclear physicist and key contributor to the Chinese nuclear weapon program Deng Jiaxian.

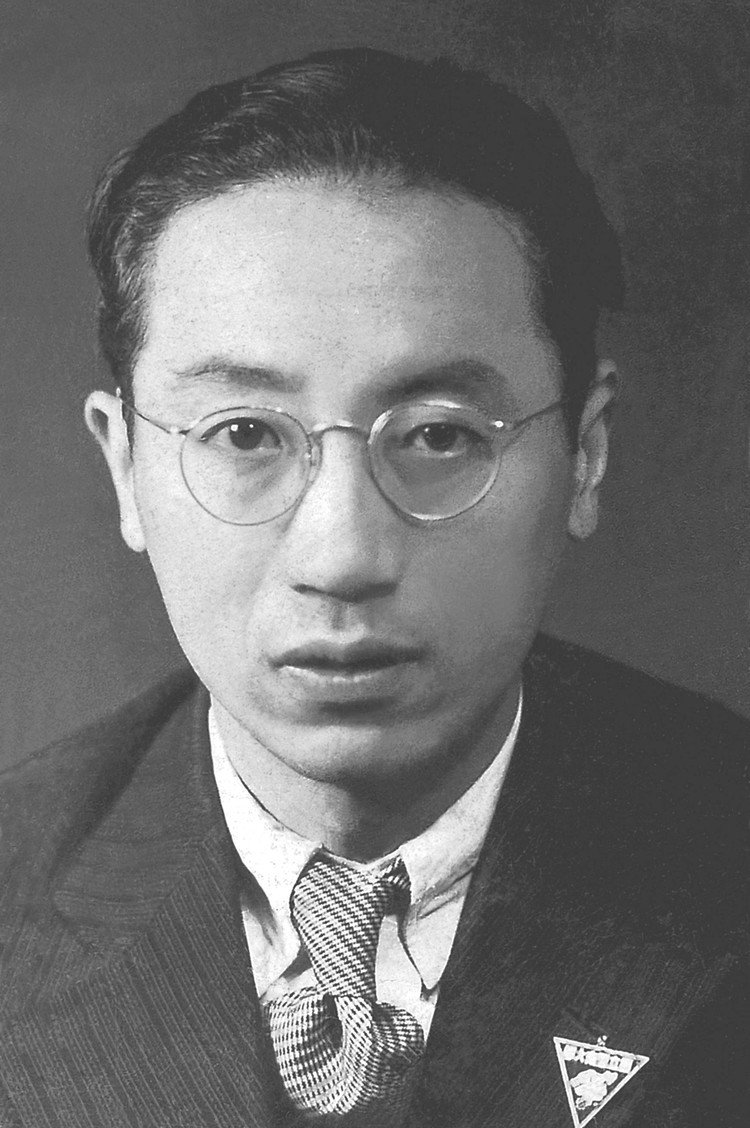
Fei Xiaotong, sociologist and anthropologist.

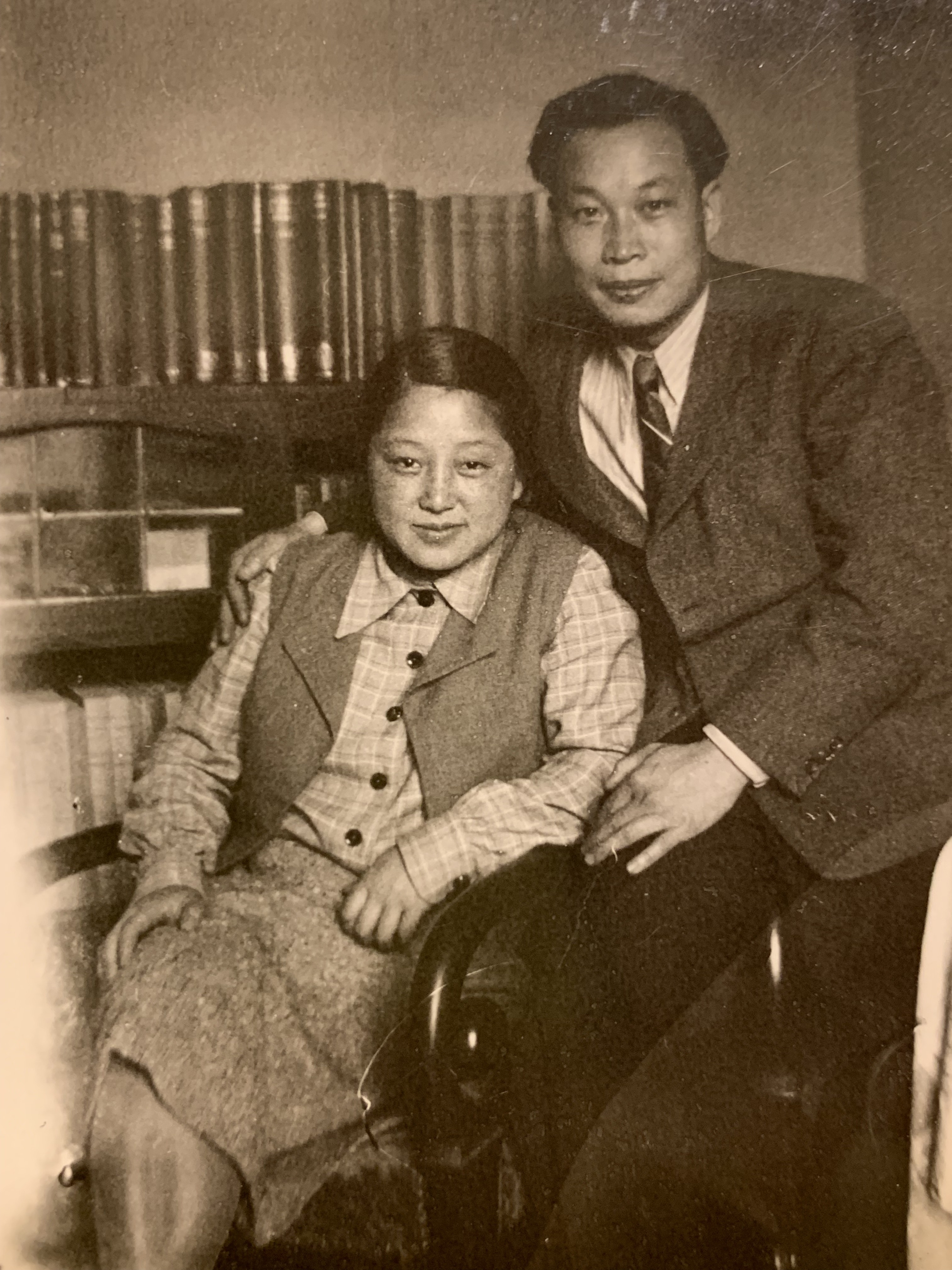
Nuclear physicist and leading organizer of the Chinese nuclear weapon program, Qian Sanqiang.

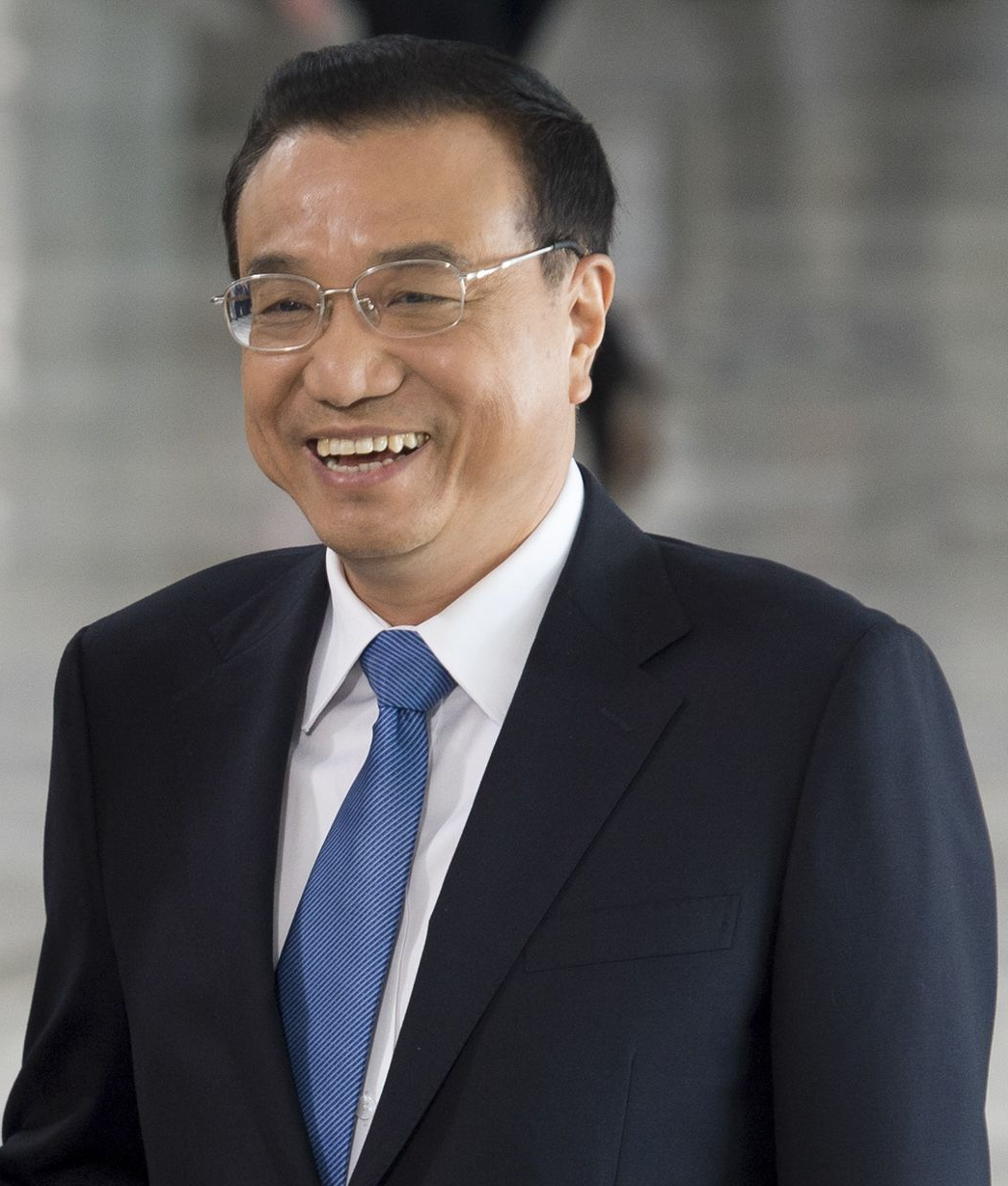
Former Premier of China, Li Keqiang (LLB, PhD)

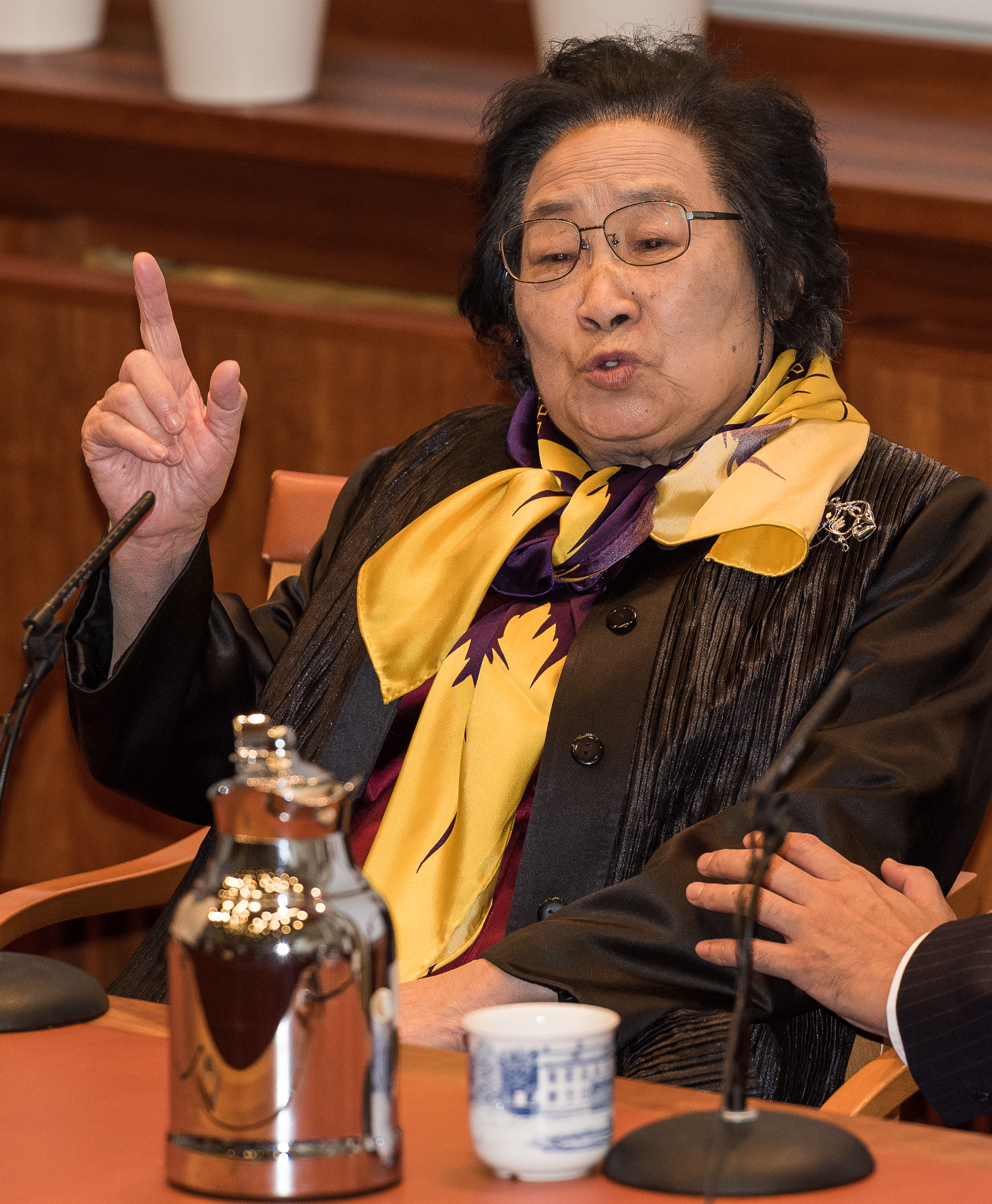
Nobel laureate Tu Youyou, pharmaceutical chemist and educator, recipient of the 2015 Nobel Prize in Physiology or Medicine.

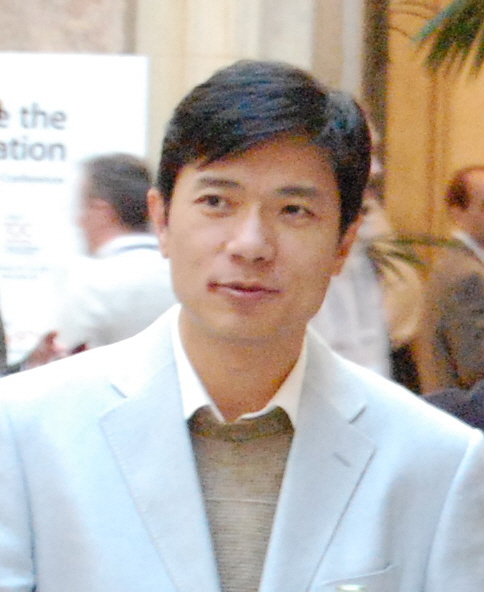
Co-founder and CEO of Baidu, billionaire Robin Li (BSc, Information Management, 1991)

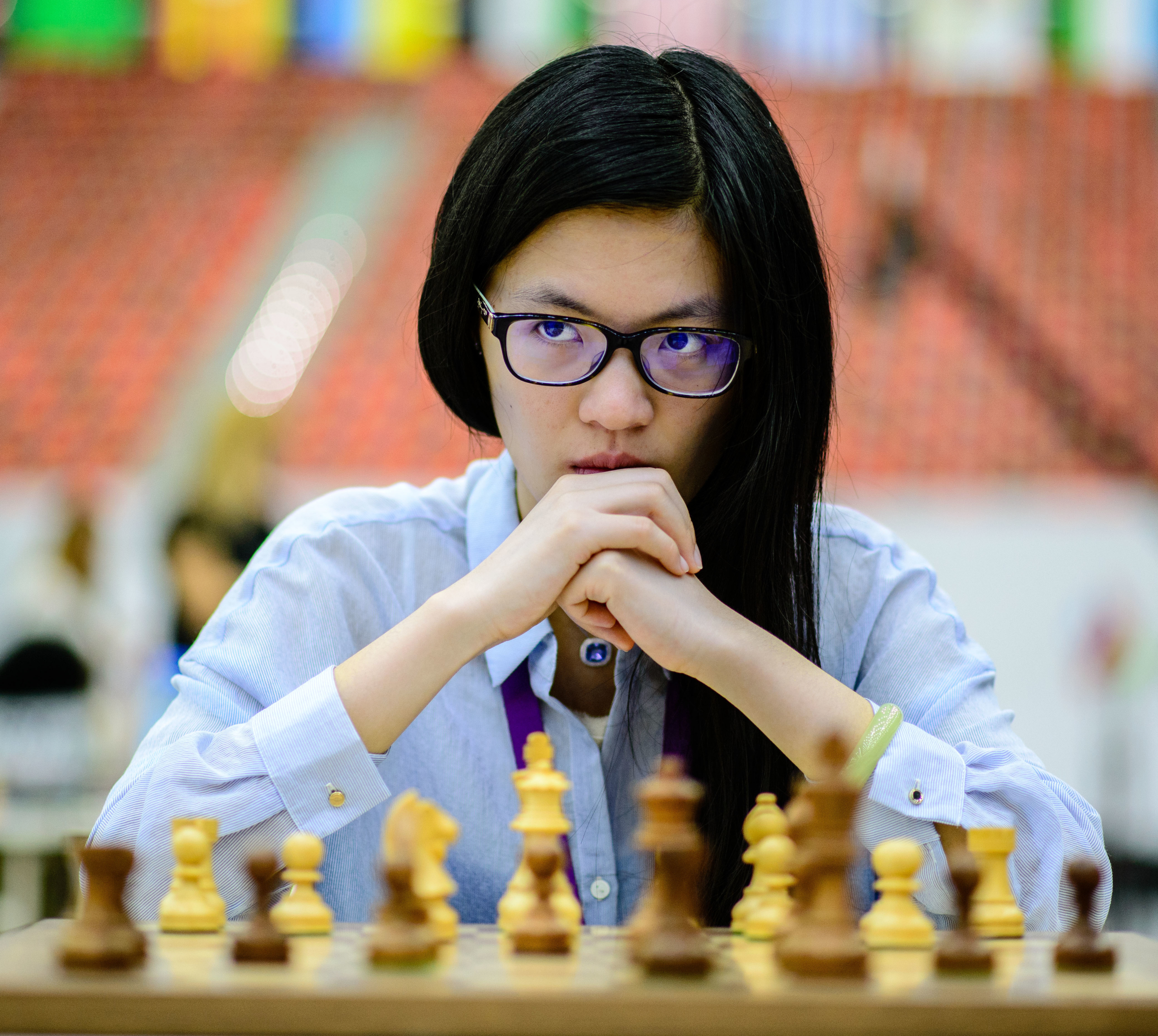
Four-time Women's World Chess Champion, Hou Yifan (BA, International Relations, 2018)

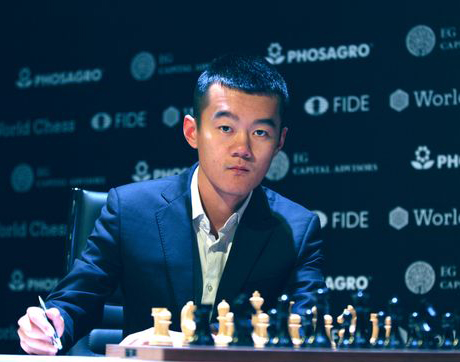
World Chess Champion and highest-rated Chinese chess player in history, Ding Liren (BA, Law)

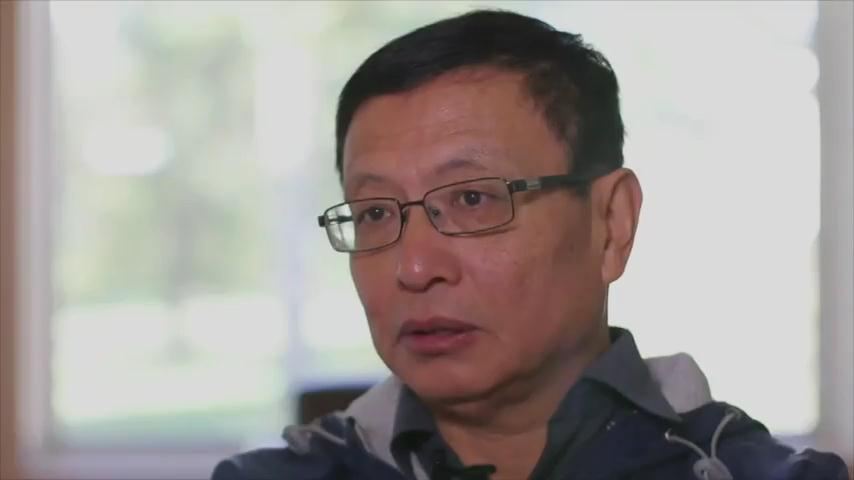
Mathematician and MacArthur Fellow Yitang Zhang (BA 1982, MA 1984)

== See also ==
- 7072 Beijingdaxue – asteroid named after Peking University
- Affiliated High School of Peking University
- Beijing Guozijian
- China Family Panel Studies
- History of Beijing
