= Yuanpei College, Peking University =

Undergraduate liberal arts college at Peking University

Yuanpei College, Peking University (北京大学元培学院) is an undergraduate liberal arts college at Peking University, a public university located in Beijing, China. Initially launched in 2001 as the Yuanpei Program, the college was formed to host the program in 2007. The college was named in honour of Cai Yuan Pei. Yuanpei College allows students to choose their undergraduate program of study, a rarity in China and other Asian countries.

The college's key differences from other undergraduate programs are its "free selection of major, tutorial system, flexible credit system with 3 to 6 years’ education span, mixed accommodation with full-length administration," and unique student environment. Shortly before the program's 10th anniversary, it also moved into its own campus, the newly renovated Yuanpei Building.

Similar undergraduate liberal arts programs have emerged at other top Asian universities, as well as at nearby rival institution Tsinghua University. Four such programs, namely the College of Liberal Studies of Seoul National University, the S.H. Ho College of the Chinese University of Hong Kong, the College of Arts and Sciences of Tokyo University, and Yuanpei College, have met annually since 2011 at the Seoul National University's International Symposium.

== See also ==
- Peking University, parent institution
- Cai Yuanpei, namesake and former president of Peking University
- Alliance of Asian Liberal Arts Universities, consortium of Asian liberal arts colleges
