= Zhan Qimin =

Chinese molecular oncologist

- 詹启敏

Dean of Peking University Shenzhen Graduate School
- Incumbent
- Assumed office 15 March 2019
- Preceded by: Wu Yundong

Executive Vice-President of Peking University
- Incumbent
- Assumed office April 2018

Vice-President of Peking University
- In office August 2017 – April 2018

Director of the Medicine Department of Peking University
- Incumbent
- Assumed office April 2016
- Preceded by: Han Qide

Personal details
- Born: January 22, 1959 (age 67) Leping, Jiangxi, China
- Party: Chinese Communist Party
- Education: Suzhou University; Peking Union Medical College
- Scientific career
- Fields: Molecular oncology
- Workplaces: Peking University

Chinese name
- Traditional Chinese: 詹啟敏
- Simplified Chinese: 詹启敏
Transcriptions
Standard Mandarin
- Hanyu Pinyin: Zhān Qǐmǐn

Zhan Qimin (Chinese: 詹启敏; pinyin: Zhān Qǐmǐn; born 22 January 1959) is a Chinese molecular oncologist currently serving as director of Peking University Medicine Department, executive vice-president of Peking University and dean of Peking University Shenzhen Graduate School. He is a member of the Chinese Communist Party.

== Biography ==
Zhan was born on January 22, 1959 in Leping, Jiangxi, with his ancestral home in Wuyuan County. He graduated from the Medical College of Suzhou University in November 1982 and Peking Union Medical College in August 1987, respectively. He carried out postdoctoral research at the Medical School of the University of California, San Francisco, the University of Texas Southwestern Medical Center and the National Cancer Institute. After university, he became a senior research assistant at the National Cancer Institute. In September 1998 he was assistant professor at the University of Pittsburgh School of Medicine, and held that position until February 2003.

Zhan returned to China in January 2002 and that same year became professor and doctoral supervisor at Peking Union Medical College and director of the State Key Laboratory of Molecular Oncology, Chinese Academy of Medical Sciences. In May 2005, he was promoted to become vice-president of the Chinese Academy of Medical Sciences and vice-president of Peking Union Medical College. In April 2016, he was transferred to Peking University and appointed director of the Department of Medicine. In August 2017, he was elevated to vice-president and then executive vice-president in April of the following year. He has concurrently served as dean of Peking University Shenzhen Graduate School since March 2019.

== Investigation ==
In July 2020, PubPeer published 25 papers by Zhan Qimin, which are suspected of academic fraud. These papers had been exposed in succession, involving the application of the same pictures in different experiments or even different articles, fabricating experimental data and seriously violating animal ethics. The 25 papers were published from 1998 to 2019.

== Honours and awards ==
- 2011 Member of the Chinese Academy of Engineering (CAE)

Educational offices
Preceded by Han Qide	Director of the Medicine Department of Peking University; 2016	Incumbent
Preceded by Wu Yundong	Dean of Peking University Shenzhen Graduate School; 2019	Incumbent
