= Jiwu Huang =

Jiwu Huang from the Shenzhen University, Shenzhen, China was named Fellow of the Institute of Electrical and Electronics Engineers (IEEE) in 2016 for contributions to multimedia data hiding and forensics.
