= Xili =

Xili could refer to the following places in China:

- Xili Subdistrict, Shenzhen (西丽街道), division of Nanshan District, Shenzhen, Guangdong
- Xili Subdistrict, Shijiazhuang (西里街道), division of Qiaoxi District, Shijiazhuang, Hebei
- Xili, Yiyuan County (西里镇), town in Yiyuan County, Shandong
