= Xili Subdistrict =

Xili Subdistrict may refer to:

- Xili Subdistrict, Shenzhen (西丽街道), division of Nanshan District, Shenzhen, Guangdong
- Xili Subdistrict, Shijiazhuang (西里街道), division of Qiaoxi District, Shijiazhuang, Hebei
