= University Town of Shenzhen =

Part of Shenzhen city, China

Coordinates: 22.5919°N 113.9713°E

- Logo of University Town of Shenzhen
- Simplified Chinese: 深圳大学城
- Traditional Chinese: 深圳大學城
Transcriptions
Standard Mandarin
- Hanyu Pinyin: Shēnzhèn Dàxuéchéng
Yue: Cantonese
- Jyutping: sam1 zan3 daai6 hok6 sing4

Name of University Town of Shenzhen

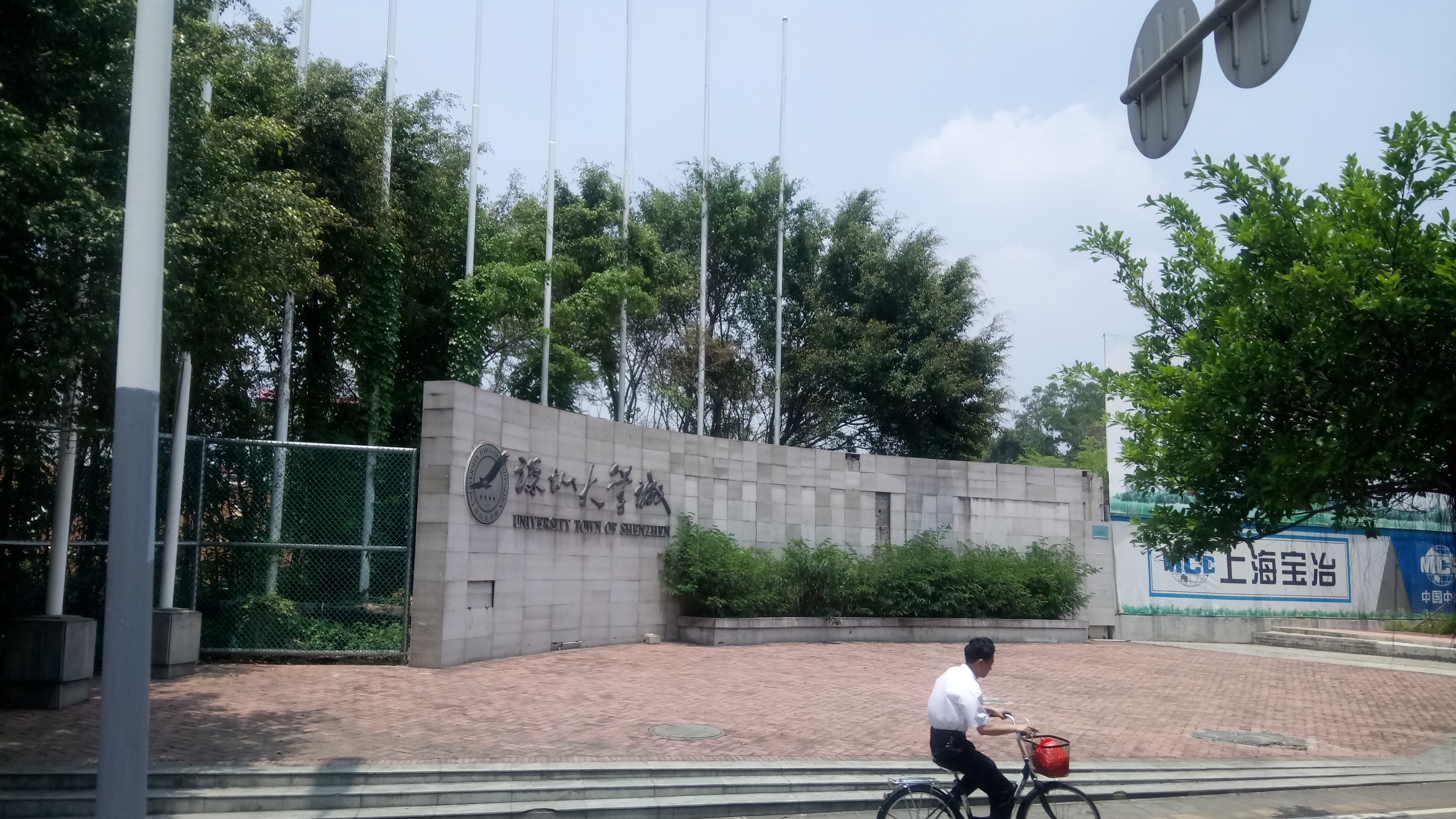
Main entrance

University Town of Shenzhen (Chinese: 深圳大学城) is a tertiary education hub or university cluster, located near Xili Lake (Chinese: 西丽湖) in the Nanshan, Shenzhen, Guangdong Province, China. The 15,000-capacity University Town Stadium, which is used mostly for football, is located in the University Town of Shenzhen.

== Institutions ==
There are six higher education institutions with of a total of 50,000 students located in the area:

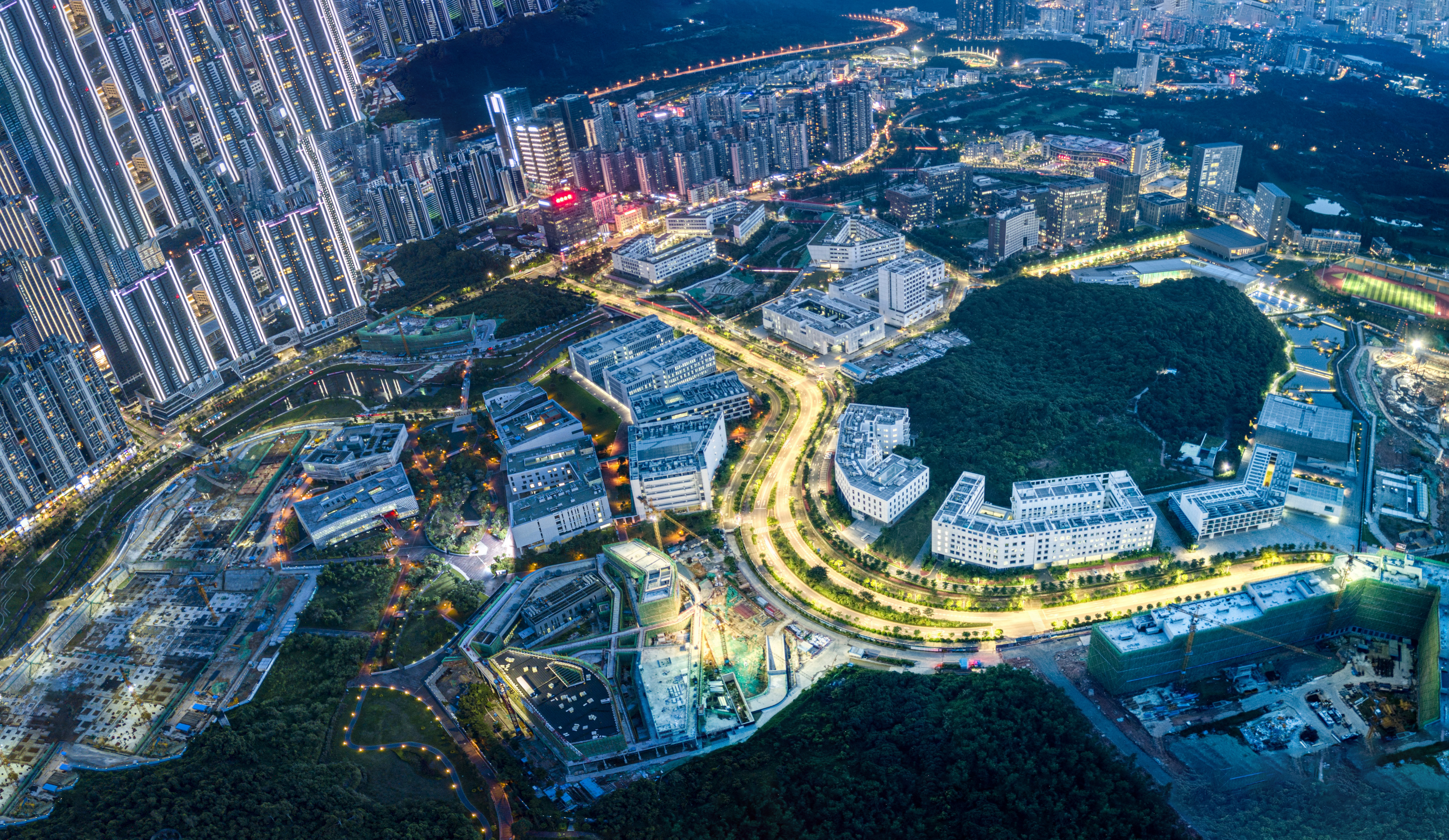
Aerial Image of East Section of UTSZ at night

University	Chinese
Tsinghua Shenzhen International Graduate School	清华大学深圳国际研究生院
Peking University Shenzhen Graduate School	北京大学深圳研究生院
Harbin Institute of Technology (Shenzhen)	哈尔滨工业大学深圳校区
Shenzhen Institute of Advanced Integration Technology, Chinese Academy of Sciences	中国科学院深圳先进技术研究院
Southern University of Science and Technology	南方科技大学
Lihu Campus of Shenzhen University	深圳大学丽湖校区
Georgia Tech Shenzhen Institute, Tianjin University	天津大学佐治亚理工深圳学院

== Nearby locations ==
- Xili Subdistrict
- Shahe West Road
- Kylin Villa
- Shenzhen Safari Park
- Qilin Mountain

== Transportation ==
- University Town Station of the Shenzhen Metro
