= Shenzhen Second People's Hospital =

Shenzhen Second People's Hospital 深圳市第二人民医院
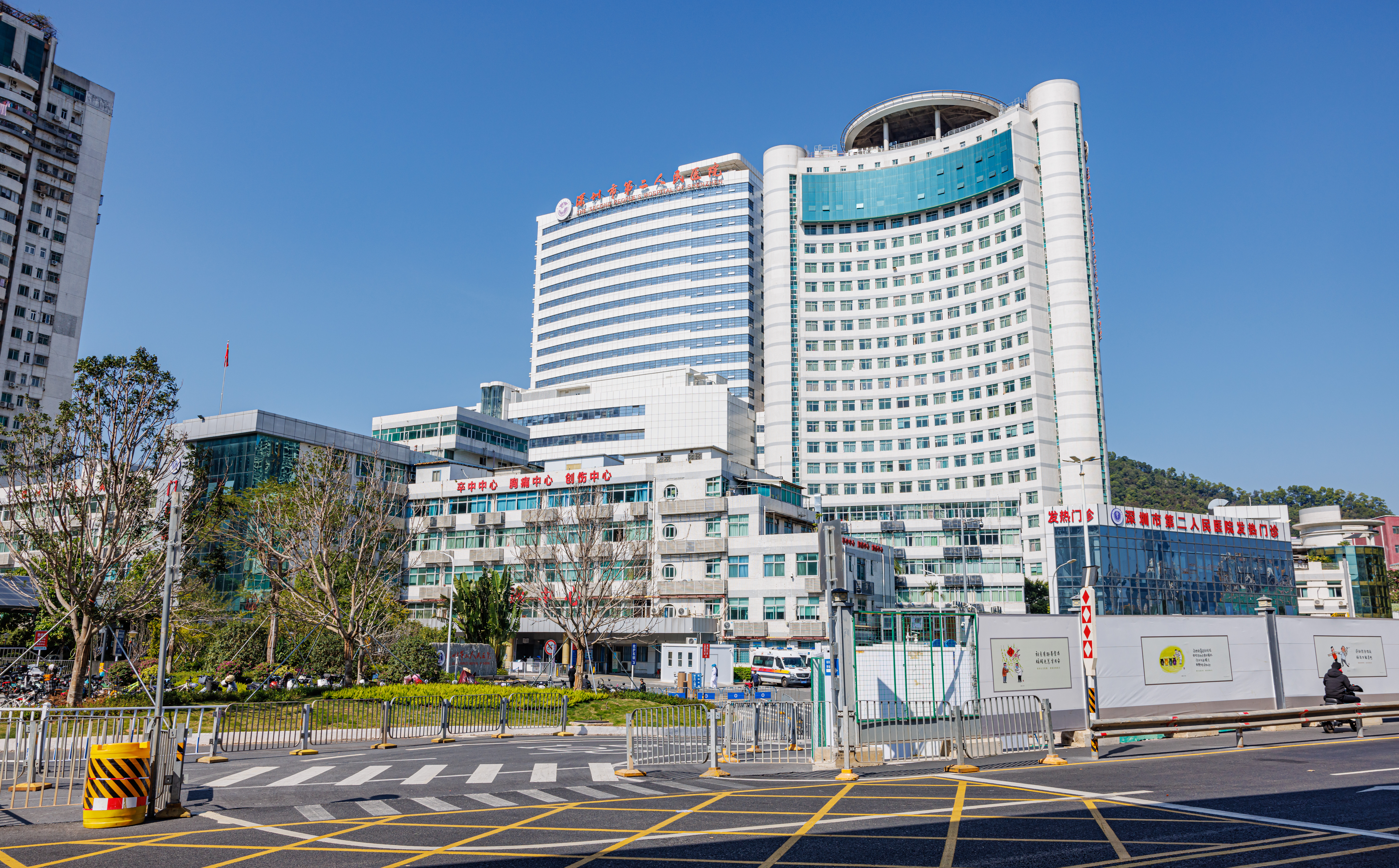

Geography
- Location: Intersection of Sungang Road and Nigang West Road, Huangmugang, Futian District, Shenzhen

Organisation
- Type: general
- Affiliated university: Shenzhen University

Services
- Beds: 1929

History
- Founded: 1979

Shenzhen Second People's Hospital (Chinese: 深圳市第二人民医院; also known as: Shenzhen University First Affiliated Hospital, Chinese: 深圳大学附属医院), formerly named Shenzhen Red Cross Hospital, Shenzhen Huaqiang Hospital. The hospital is a municipal public hospital of Shenzhen, located at the intersection of Hongli Road and Huaqiang Road, Huaqiangbei area, Futian District. It is a national Grade III Class A hospital.

The Shenzhen Emergency Medical Center is also located within Shenzhen Second People's Hospital, but they are two different institutions.

== History ==
In 1979, a detachment of the Infrastructure Engineering Corps participated in the construction of the Shenzhen Special Economic Zone. Among them, the Infrastructure Engineering Corps Metallurgical Command (externally known as Unit 00049) formed an Infrastructure Engineering Corps medical unit in Zhupeng and established the Shenzhen Temporary Command Post Hospital of the Infrastructure Engineering Corps Metallurgical Command. After the Infrastructure Engineering Corps was demobilized in 1983, it merged with the outpatient department of the 31st detachment of the Infrastructure Engineering Corps and established the Shenzhen Infrastructure Workers' Hospital at the current Bijia Mountain site.

In 1984, the hospital was renamed Shenzhen Huaqiang Hospital and became an enterprise hospital of the Huaqiang Group.

In 1987, Shenzhen Huaqiang Hospital merged with the outpatient department of the Red Cross Hospital and was renamed Shenzhen Red Cross Hospital (abbreviated as Honghui Hospital), under the Shenzhen Municipal Health Bureau。

In 1996, it was rated as a Grade III Class A hospital.

In May 2000, Honghui Hospital completed a 23-story inpatient building, with Shenzhen's first medical helipad on the top floor. From then on, the number of beds expanded to 613.

In 2001, it was renamed Shenzhen Second People's Hospital.

In 2008, it became Shenzhen University First Affiliated Hospital.

In 2017, together with Dapeng New District it jointly established the Shenzhen Dapeng New District Medical and Health Group.

== Gallery ==
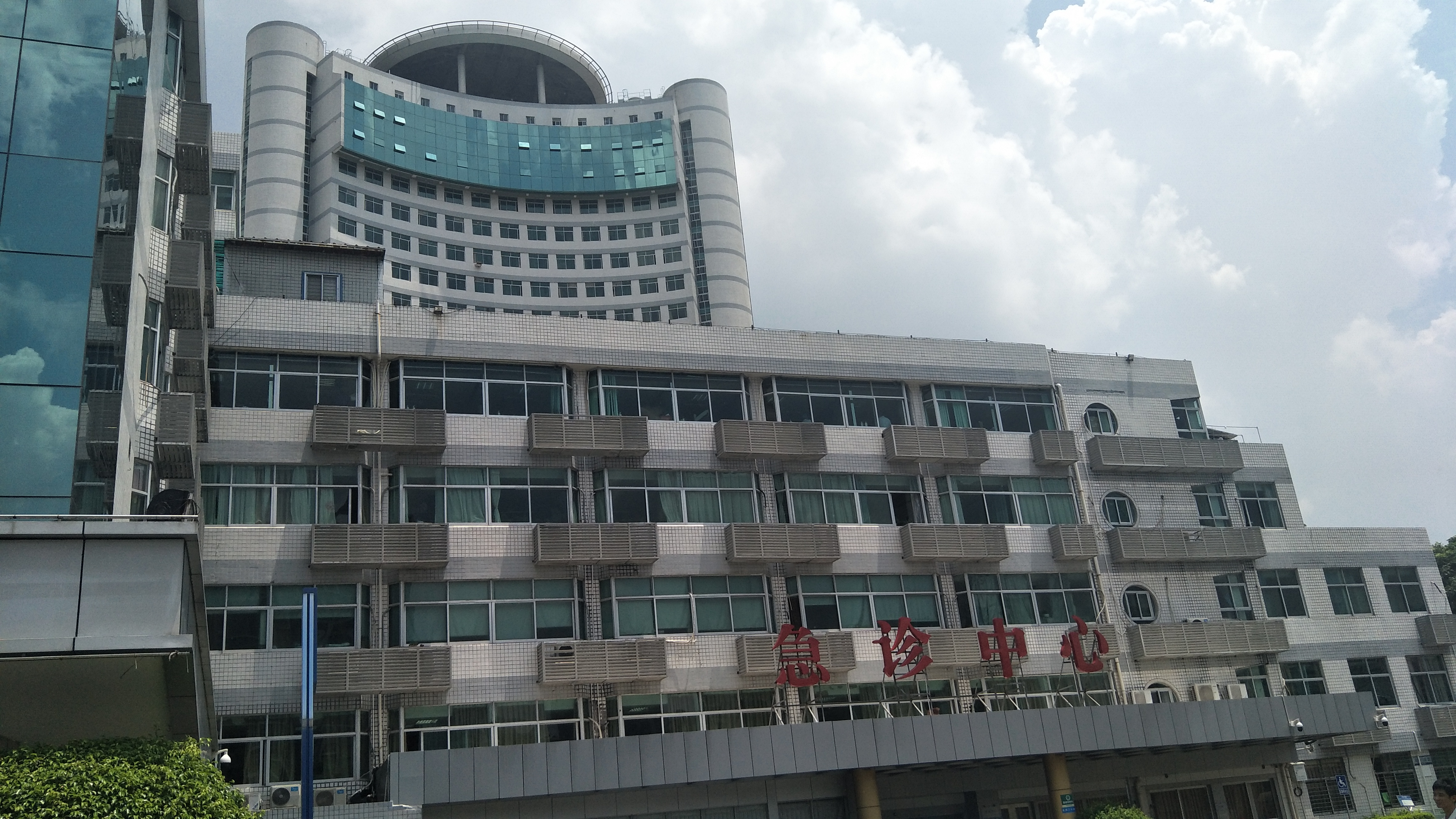
Outpatient and Emergency Building and Internal Medicine Building

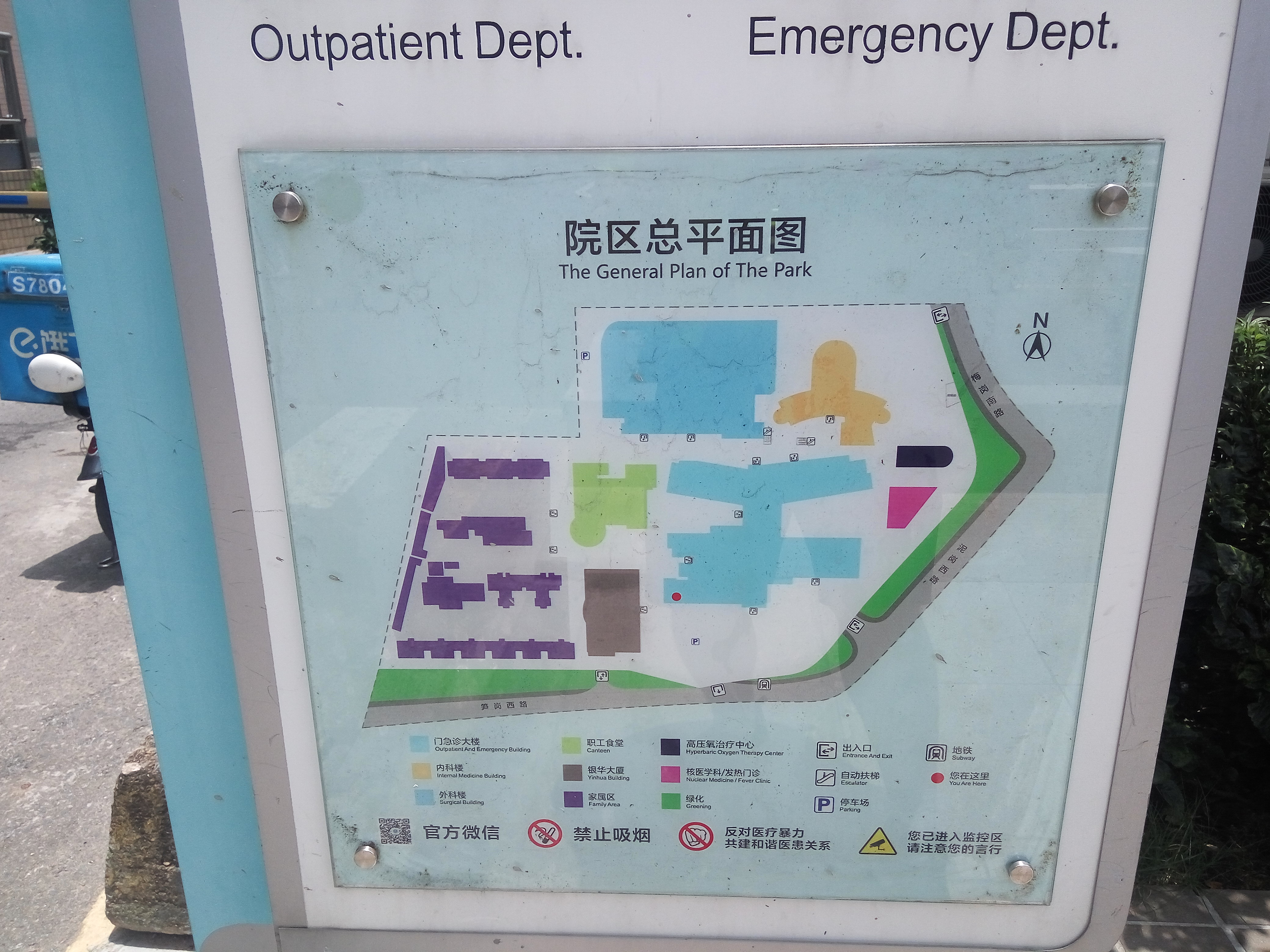
General plan of the campus

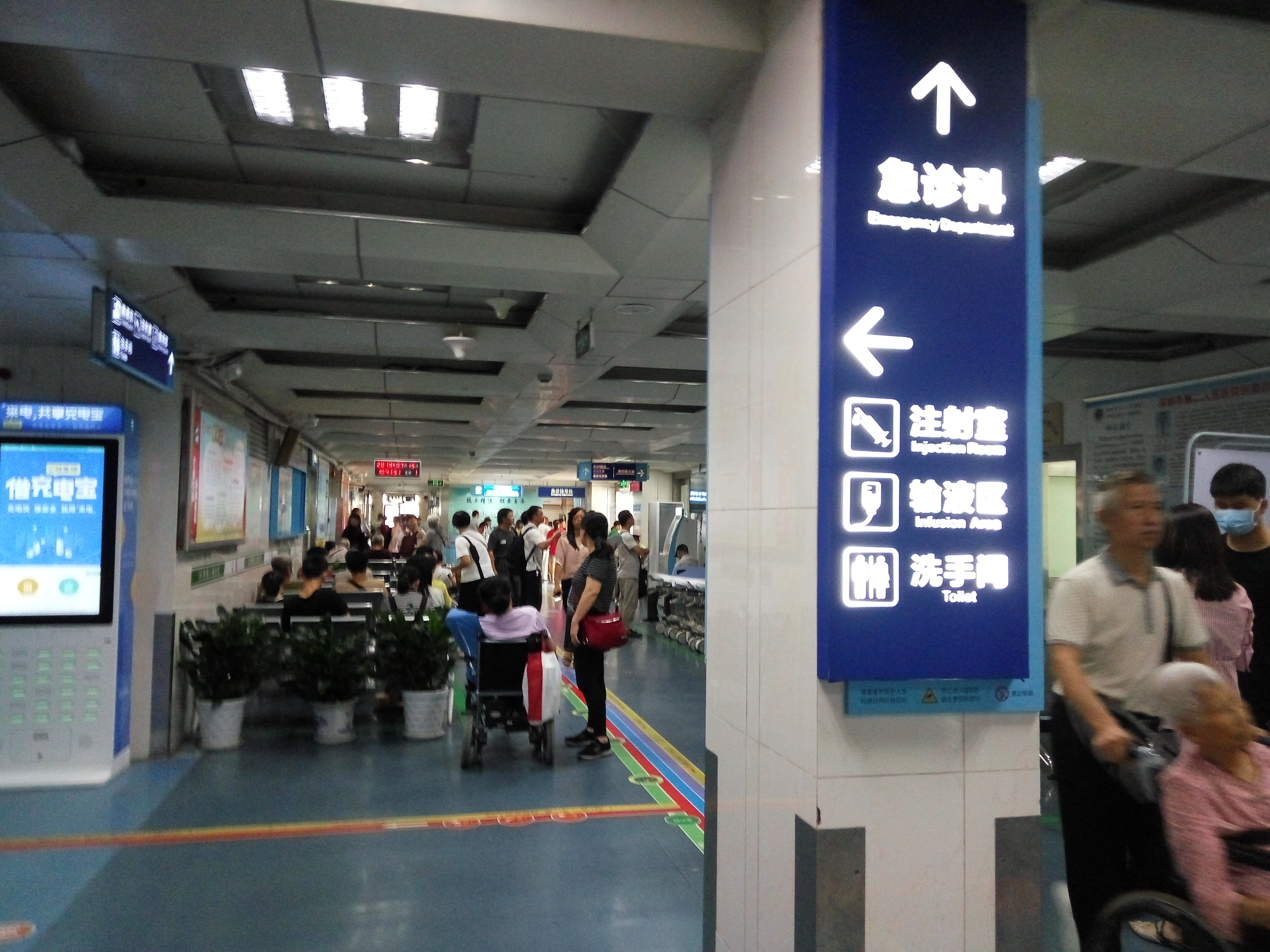
Emergency department

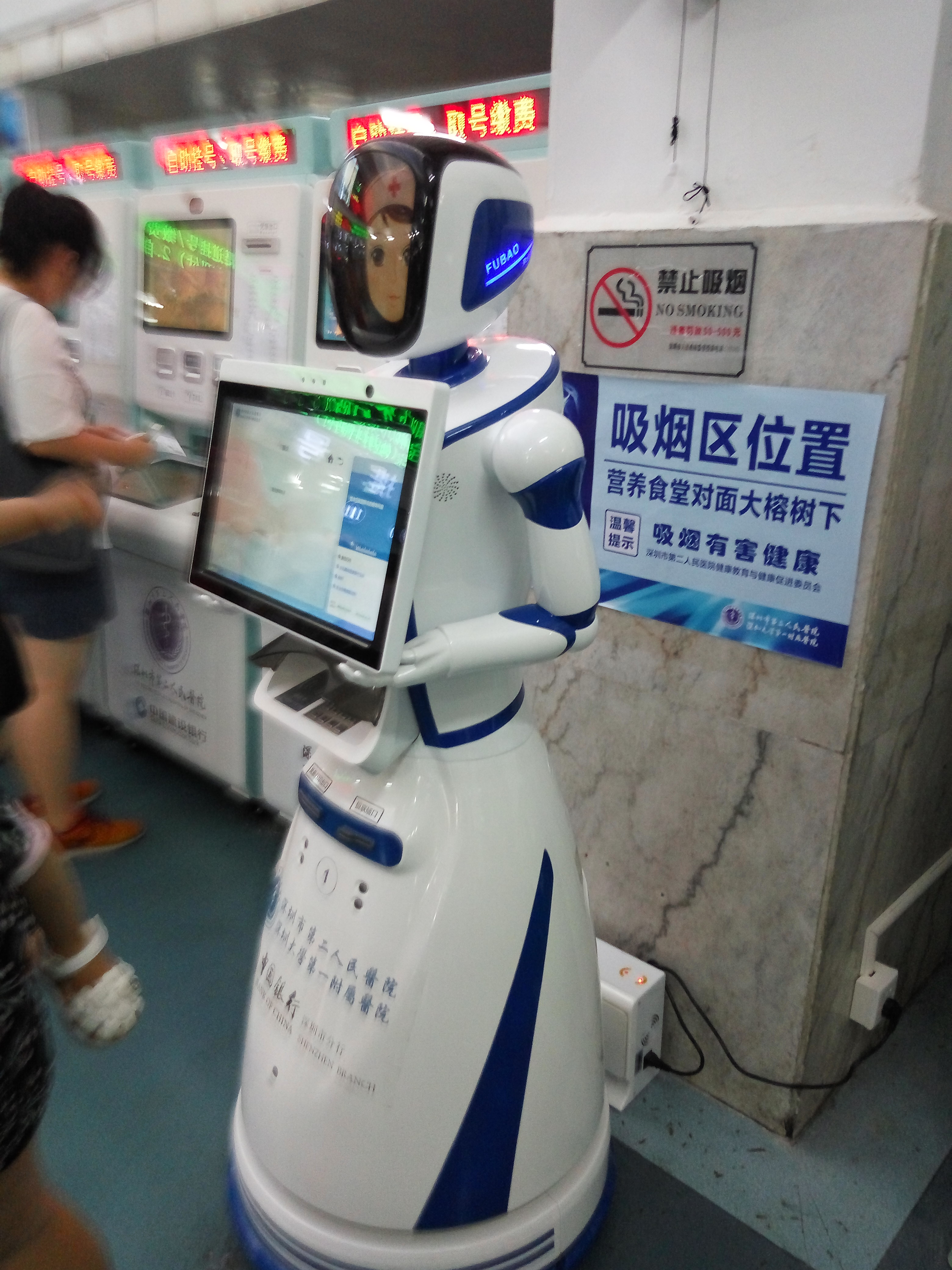
Patient service robot

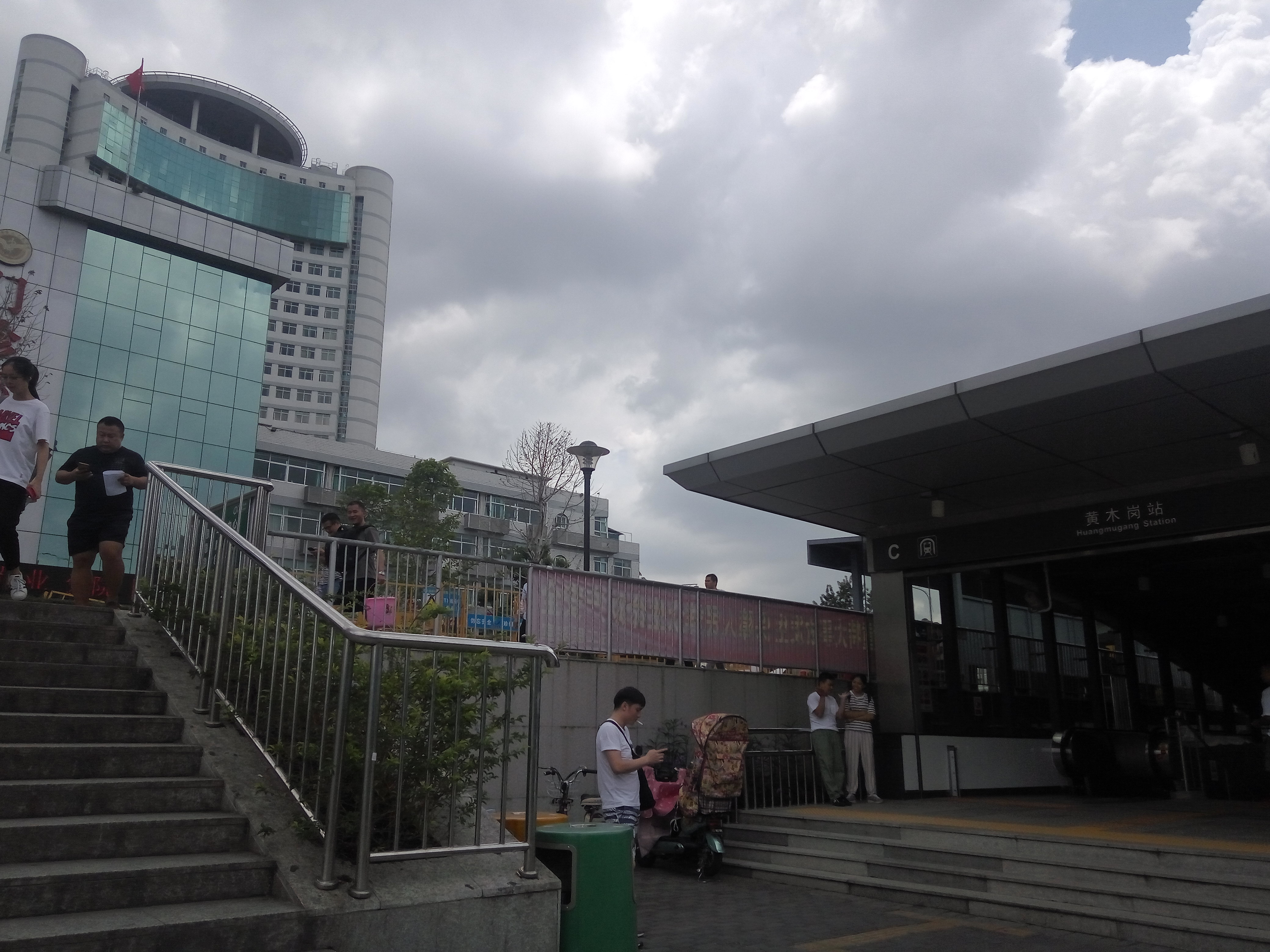
The hospital entrance is next to Exit C of Huangmugang Metro Station (the metro exit has been removed)

== Transportation ==
=== Bus ===
- Second Municipal Hospital Stop
- Gymnasium West Stop

=== Metro ===
- Shenzhen Metro: Huangmugang Station
