= Shenzhen Safari Park =

Zoo in Shenzhen, China

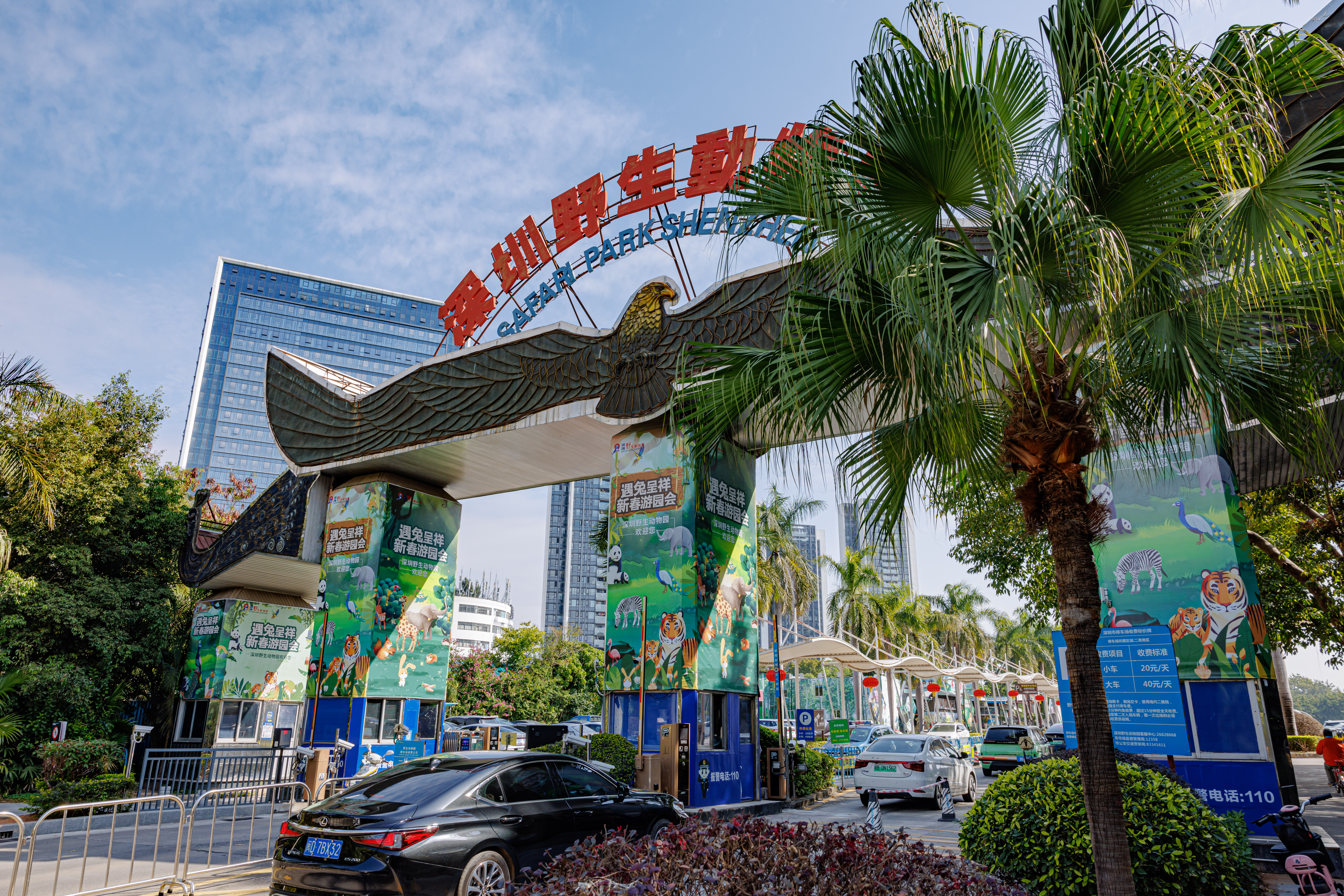
- Main vehicular entrance
- Interactive map of Shenzhen Safari Park
- 22.60°N 113.97°E
- Date opened: September 28, 1993
- Location: Xili, Nanshan, Shenzhen, China
- Public transit: Dongwuyuan Bus Station, buses 36, 49, 66, 101, 104, M203, 226, M460, B736, B796 and B797
- Website: www.szzoo.net

Shenzhen Safari Park
- Simplified Chinese: 深圳野生动物园
- Traditional Chinese: 深圳野生動物園
Transcriptions
Standard Mandarin
- Hanyu Pinyin: Shēnzhèn Yěshēng Dòngwùyuán
Yue: Cantonese
- Jyutping: sam1 zan3 je5 saang1 dung6 mat6 jyun4

Shenzhen Safari Park (Chinese: 深圳野生动物园) is a zoo in Shenzhen, China. It is located in near Xili Lake in Xili Subdistrict and covers an area of 1.2 million square meters. It is the first zoo in China to have uncaged animals. There are over 300 species and more than ten thousand animals in the zoo, including endangered ones such as giant pandas and South China tigers.

== History ==
The zoo first opened on September 28, 1993. Since 2004, the zoo's black swans have been engaged in a commensal relationship with the koi found in the zoo's waters. The swans had originally begun dipping their food pellets into the water to moisten the texture, and as a result, the koi learned to swim up to the swans and eat the pellets.

On May 1, 2014, a lioness in the park gave birth to three cubs and neglected to care for them. Park workers had begun bottle-feeding the cubs in order to keep them nourished. A local pet store sent a Golden Retriever to care for the cubs, and the dog was accepted by the cubs as their surrogate mother on May 16.

=== Controversy ===
On October 2, 2014, a horse that was pulling tourists in a heavy carriage at the zoo, for the twelfth time that day, collapsed and died. The tourists, as well as some of the zoo's security guards, concluded that the horse's death was a result of overworking and malnourishment.

== Gallery ==
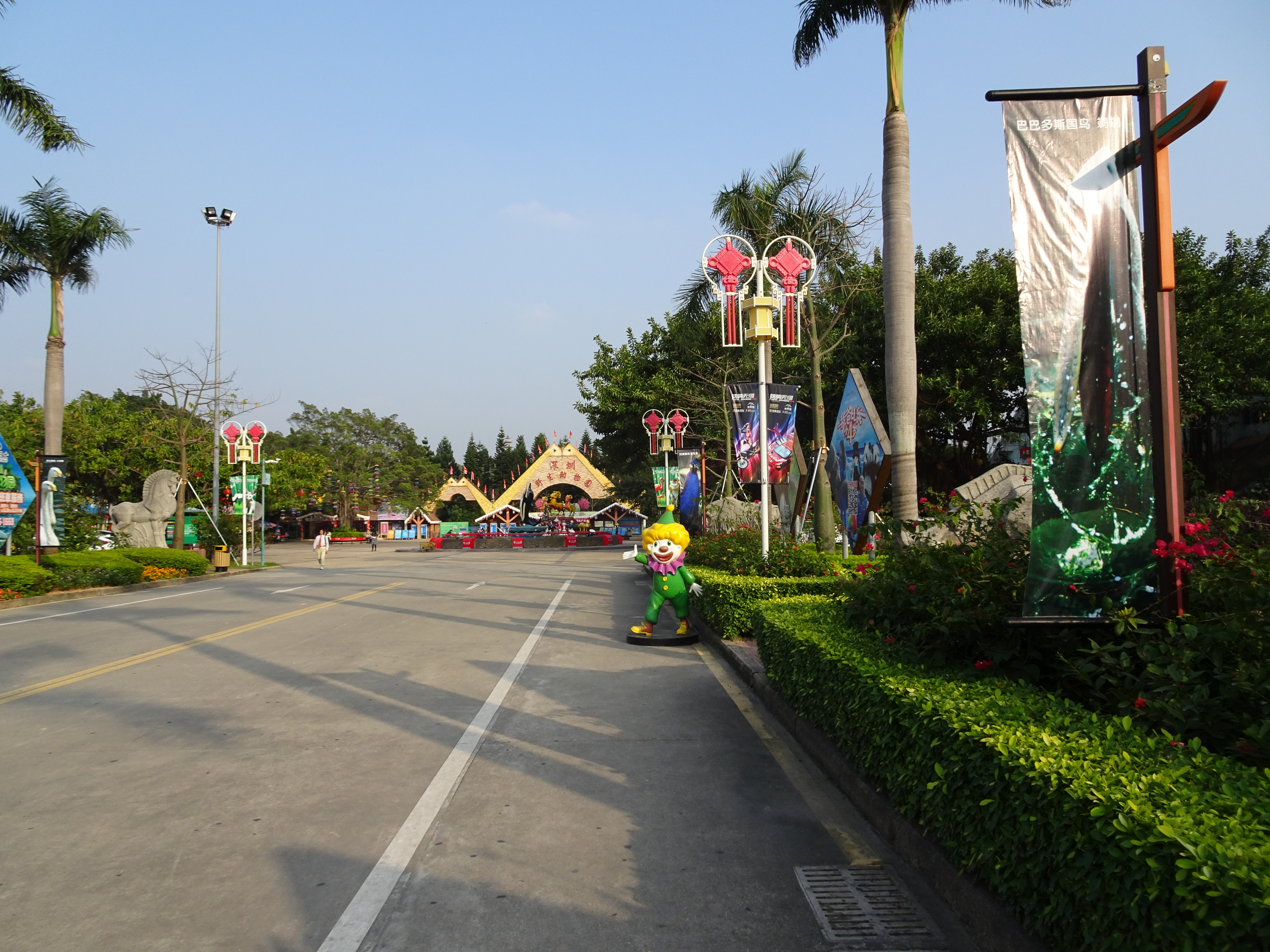
A street leading into Shenzhen Safari Park.

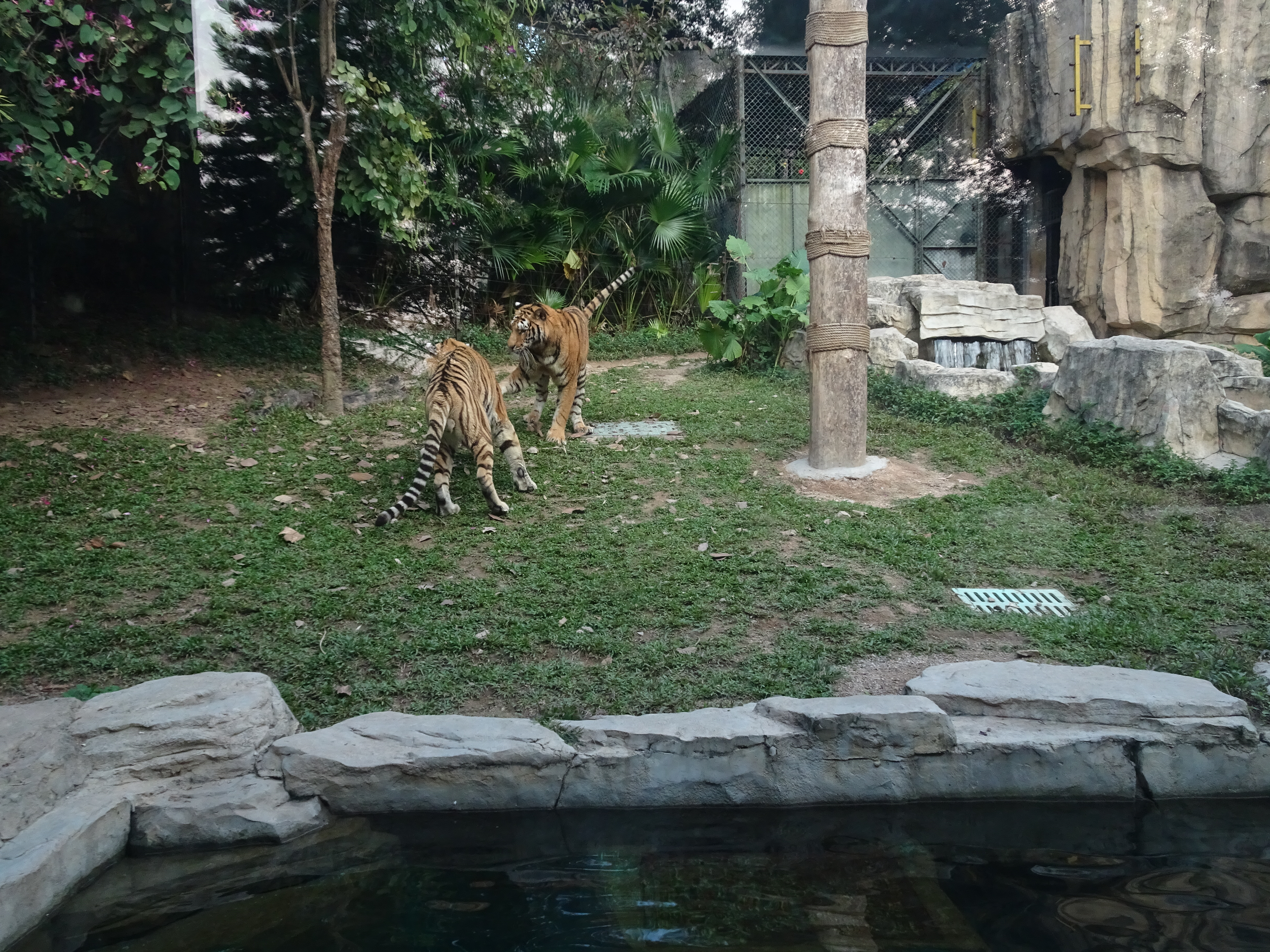
The zoo's tiger enclosure.

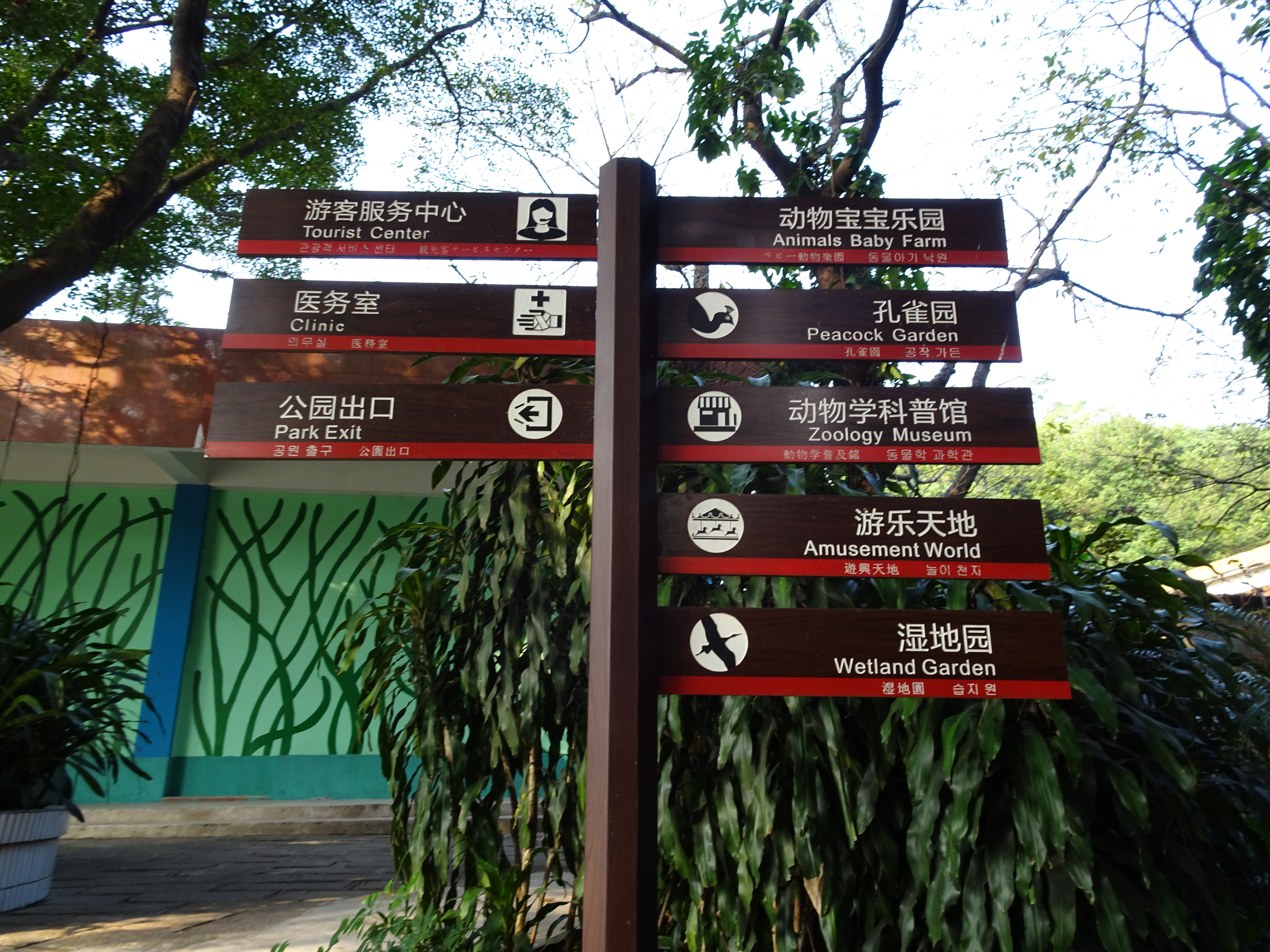
A sign indicating the zoo's different areas of interest.

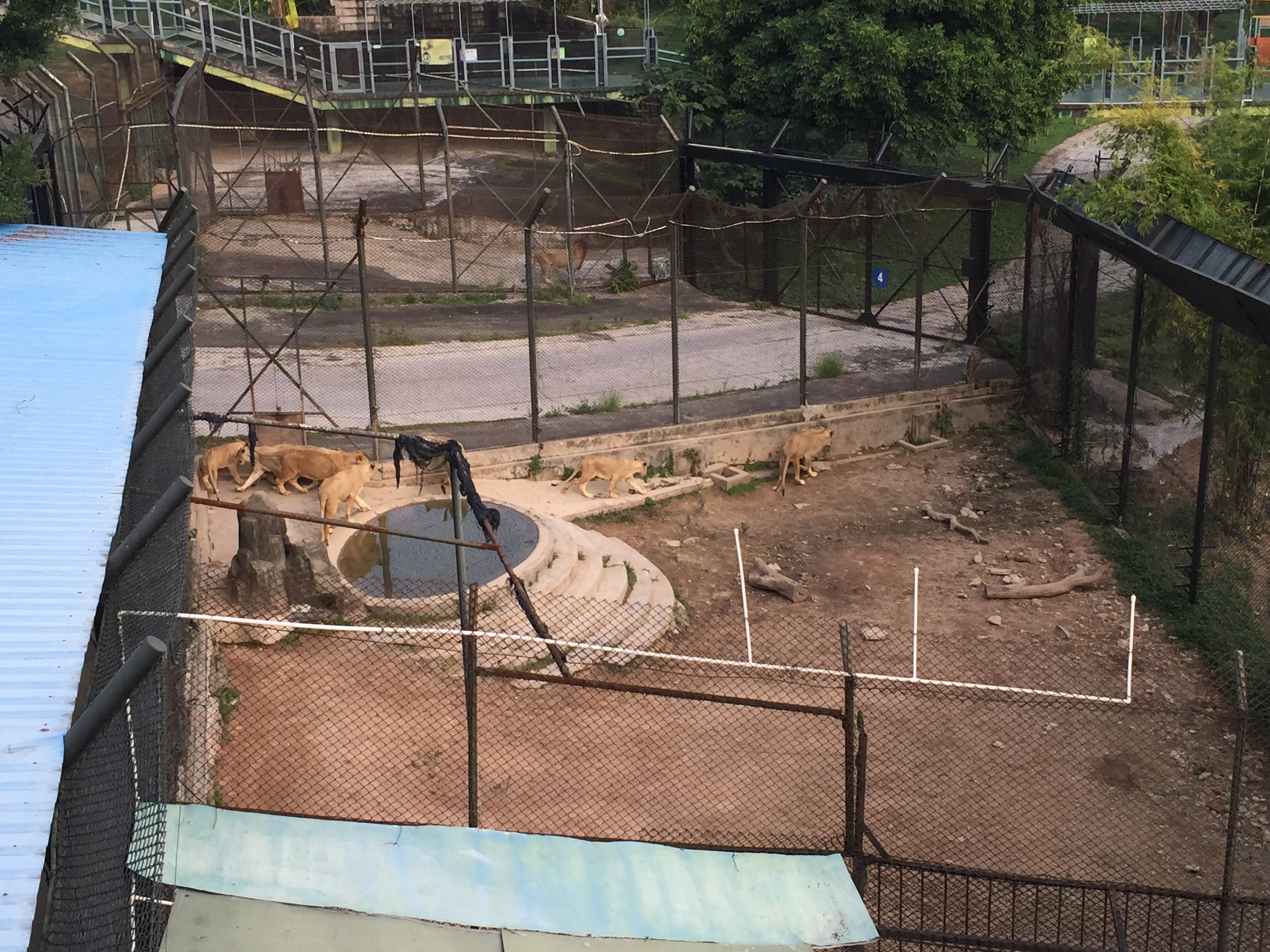
A lioness enclosure in Shenzhen Safari Park in January 2016

== See also ==
- List of parks in Shenzhen
