= Peking University Shenzhen Graduate School =

Branch of PKU in Shenzhen, Guangdong, China

Coordinates: 22°35′57″N 113°59′02″E

- 北京大学深圳研究生院 (Chinese)
- Type: National, Graduate and Research University
- Established: 2001; 25 years ago
- Affiliations: IARU, AEARU, APRU, BESETOHA, C9
- Chancellor: Dr. Wu Yundong
- Faculty: FT 283, PT 50
- Students: 3,764
- Doctoral students: 503
- Location: Shenzhen, China
- Campus: 64.24 acre; Urban
- Newspaper: thenanyan.com
- Colors: Red
- Website: www.pkusz.edu.cn

Chinese name
- Simplified Chinese: 北京大学深圳研究生院
- Traditional Chinese: 北京大學深圳研究生院
Transcriptions
Standard Mandarin
- Hanyu Pinyin: Běijīng Dàxué Shēnzhèn Yánjiūshēngyuàn
Yue: Cantonese
- Jyutping: bak1 ging1 daai6 hok6 sam1 zan3 jin4 gau3 saang1 jyun6*2

The Peking University Shenzhen Graduate School (PKU Shenzhen) is a public research university established as a satellite graduate school of Peking University in April 2001 via a joint venture with the Shenzhen Municipal Government. It is situated inside the University Town of Shenzhen, along with the Tsinghua University Shenzhen International Graduate School and the Harbin Institute of Technology, Shenzhen.

== Campus ==
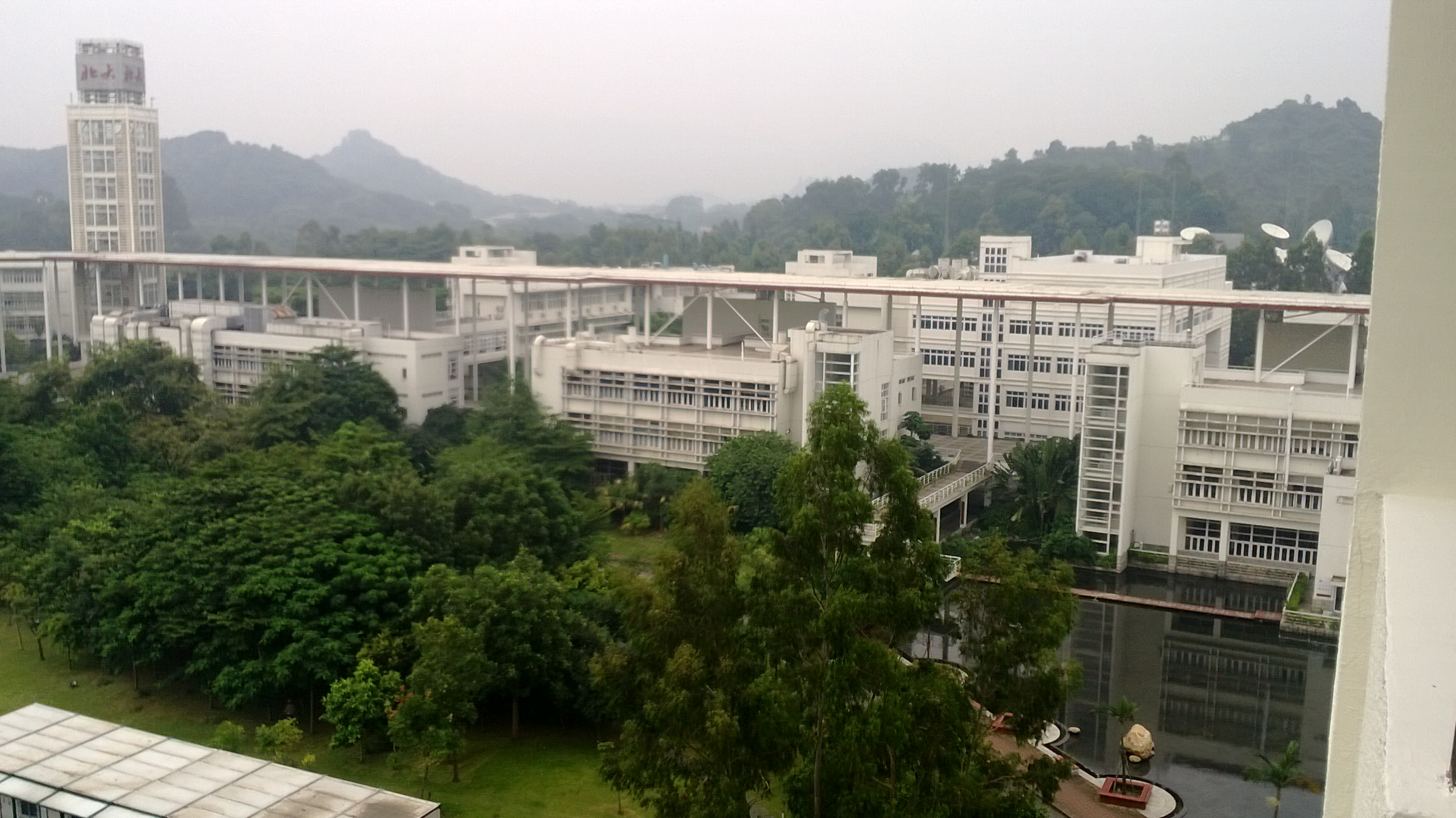
Peking University Shenzhen academic block adorned by the May 4th tower

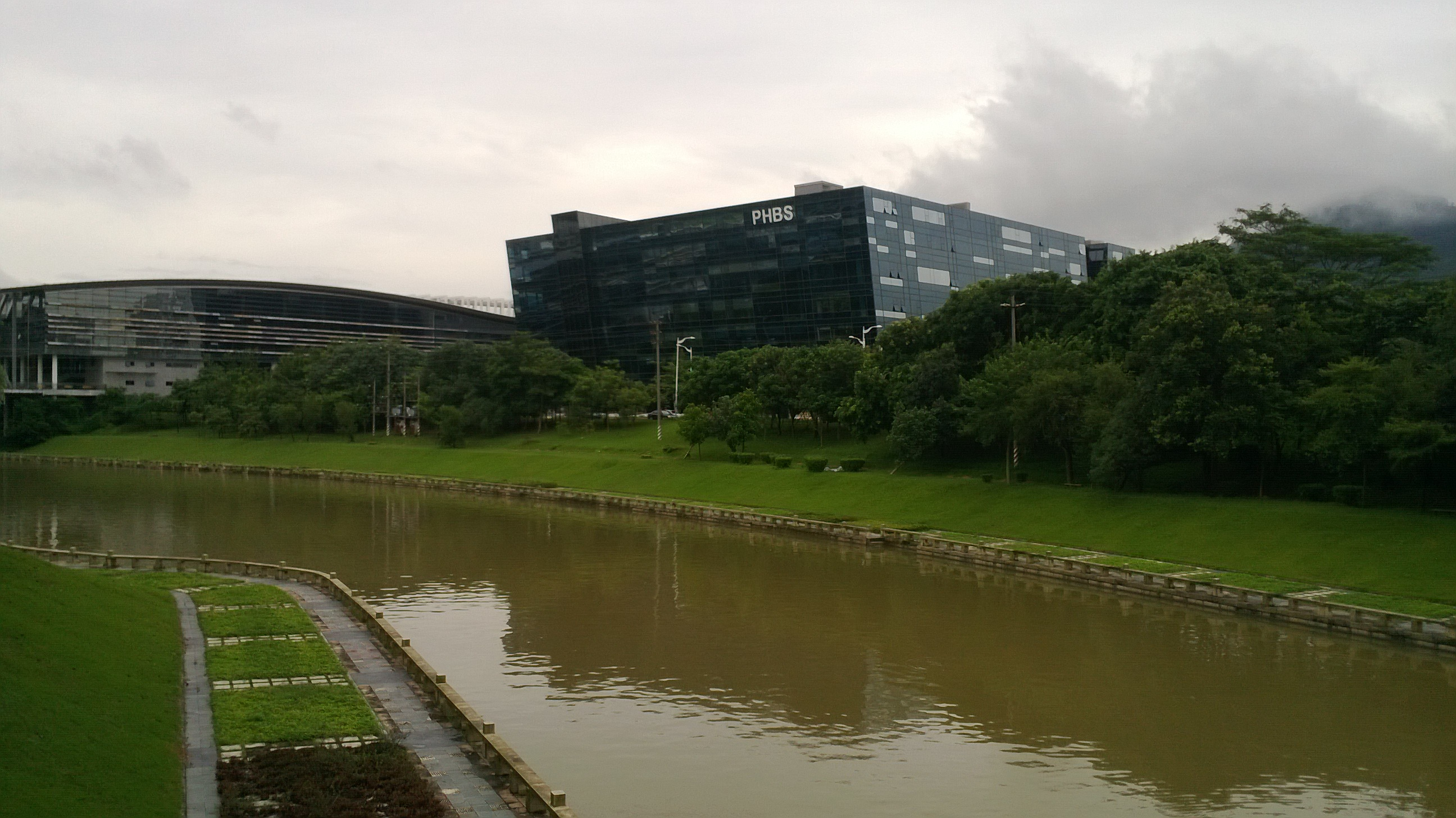
Peking University HSBC Business School with the University Town of Shenzhen library.

Peking University Shenzhen is a fully residential university. Peking University Shenzhen's campus is located in the Nanshan district of Shenzhen within the University Town of Shenzhen alongside Tsinghua University Shenzhen International Graduate School and Harbin Institute of Technology (Shenzhen).

== Academics ==
PKU Shenzhen is a graduate education institution comprising nine schools and 30 research laboratories, among which are several major State-level institutions:

- HSBC Business School
- School of Transnational Law
- School of Chemical Biology and Biotechnology
- School of Electronic and Computer Engineering
- School of Environment and Energy
- School of Humanities and Social Sciences
- School of Urban Planning and Design
- School of Advanced Materials
- School of AI for Science

=== HSBC Business School ===
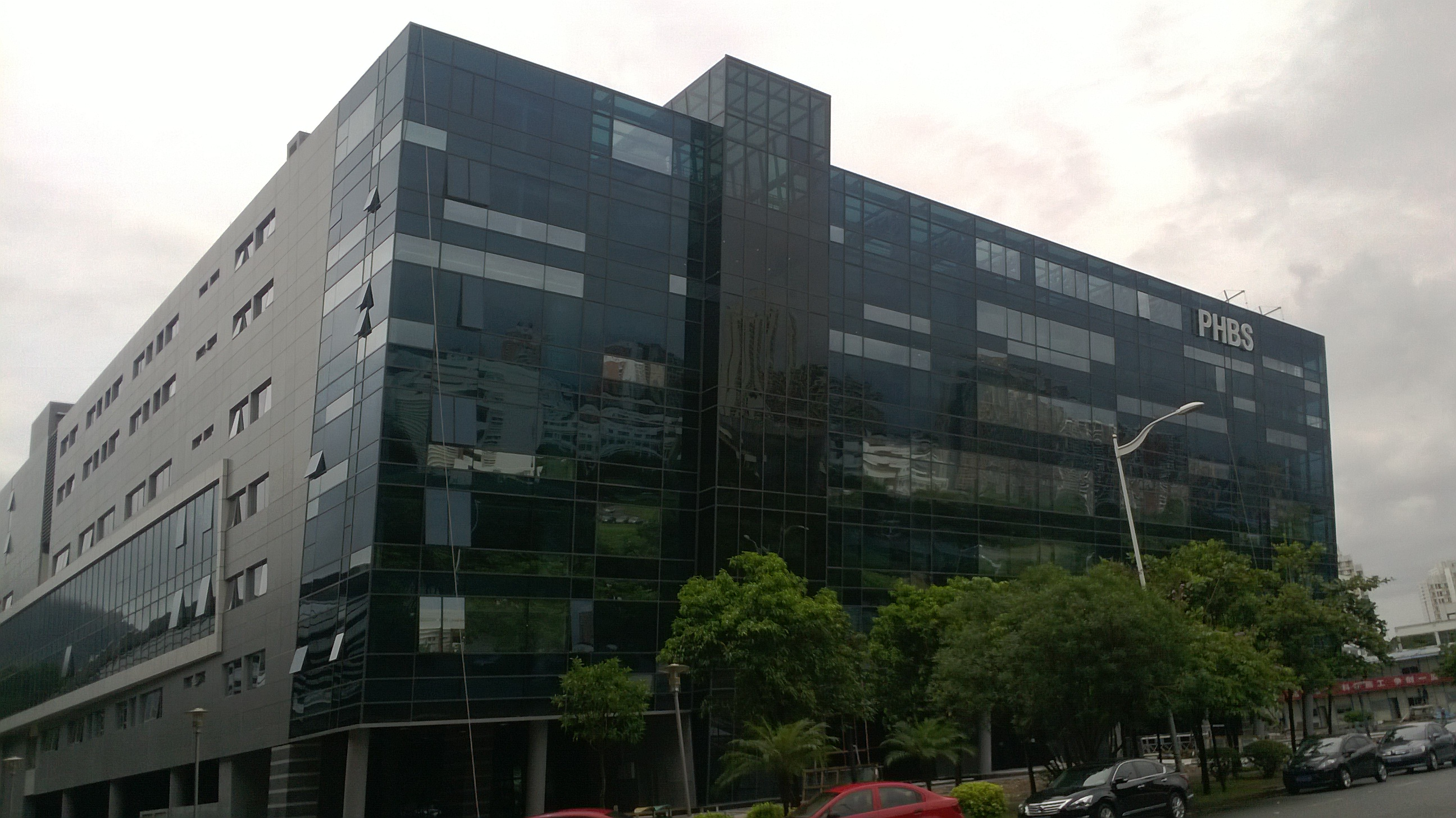
HSBC Business School

==== Full-Time Master's Programs ====
HSBC Business School offers full-time graduate programs in Economics, Management and Quantitative Finance with instruction in English. The school also runs several graduate programs with the language of instruction as Mandarin Chinese.

PKU HSBC Business School's full-time MBA program started in 2012. Currently this program is only open to domestic students and is conducted solely in Mandarin Chinese.

The school also runs Executive Master of Business Administration (EMBA) and Executive Development Programs (EDP).

==== PHBS Financial Research Laboratory ====
The HSBC Business School Financial Research Laboratory is a National Key Laboratory established by the direct financial support of the Chinese government and specializes in financial product development, financial market research, and financial transactions training. The lab conducts research and training in the various fields of finance. The PHBS Finance Lab releases a real time index called China Commodity Futures Index which is used for trading commodities all over China.

=== School of Transnational Law ===
The School of Transnational Law (STL) is the world's first law school to offer a full-time dual degree program of a Chinese Juris Master and an American Juris Doctor in four years.

The curriculum covers the full scope of the two nations' legal systems, as well as a variety of legal systems from Europe and Asia. Combining theory and practice, the pedagogy deploys the Socratic Method and other techniques to foster the skills required at the highest levels of legal practice. Jeffrey Lehman served as the founding dean of the School of Transnational Law.

STL also offers a two-year full-time Master of Laws degree program for foreign practicing lawyers or potential students who already have a first law degree or equivalent outside mainland China.

== Library ==
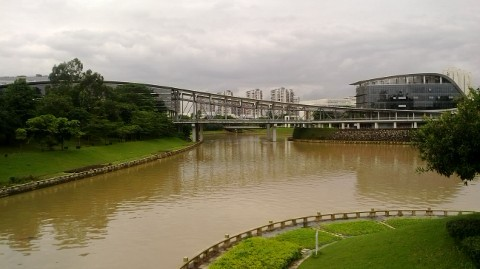
University Town Library

Peking University Shenzhen Graduate School is served by the Shenzhen Science and Technology Library situated on campus. The library is shared by the graduate schools of Peking University and Tsinghua University, and Harbin Institute of Technology (Shenzhen). It is open to the general public as well. The library at present holds 1.5 million books, journals and bound periodicals 3000 general seats and caters to over 8000 visitors per day. The library offers a wide array of books spread over four floors with over 1700 data ports and 210 internet enabled computers for personal use. The various services of the library include research services, circulation services, citations reporting service, documentation service, competitive intelligence counselling, translation service and the media lab of the library provides multimedia information services. Apart from the University Town Library, Peking University Shenzhen Graduate School students are also served Shenzhen Library with a collection of over four million books and periodicals making it one of the largest libraries in China. The University Town Library also houses the Peking University School of Transnational Law Legal Research Center.

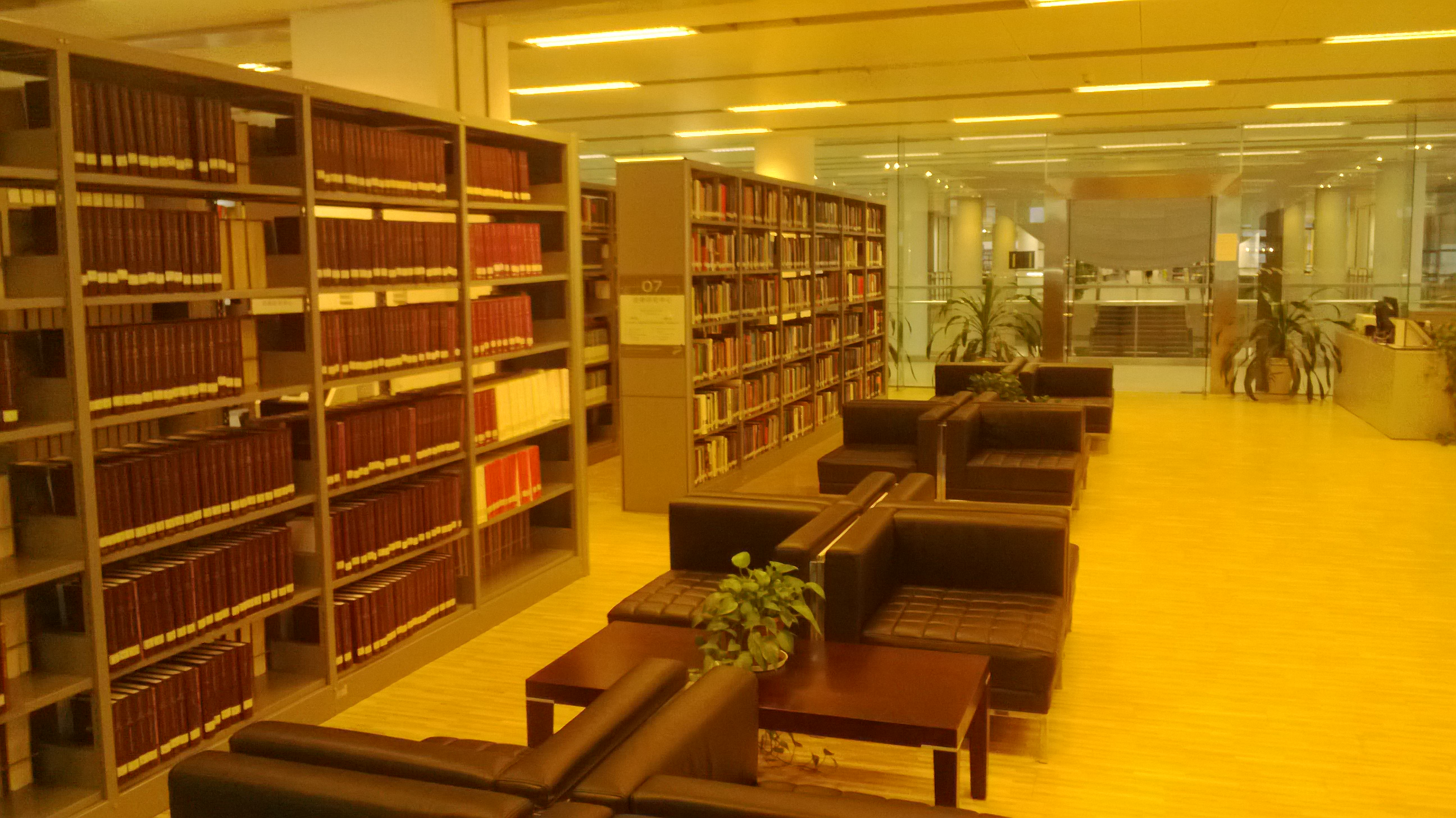
School of Law Legal Research Center

=== Infrastructure ===
The library building is spread over four floors with a total area of 52,000 square meters and was designed by RMJM. The library is shaped like "a dragon spanning a river" with a length of 480 meters that mirrors the landscape of the region. The library has won several awards for its sustainable design such as 2007 American Institute of Architects Merit award, 2008: The Chicago Athenaeum Museum of Architecture and Design, International Architecture Award and 2008: Hong Kong Design Centre - Design for Asia Merit Award. The allied resources of the library include a 260-seat scholarly conference hall, two 78-seat training classrooms, a 60-seat conference hall, 24 personal research rooms, 5 discussion rooms for group discussion, meetings etc.

=== Online resources ===
University Town of Shenzhen Library offers online resources including subscription various databases such as ProQuest-ABI/INFORM, EconLit, Ebrary, MyiLibrary, ScienceDirect-Elsevier, Factiva and provide complete access to American Economic Association journals, Journal of Finance, Harvard Business Review back volumes etc. The Peking University HSBC Business School subscribes to Wharton Research and Data Services network from the Wharton School and all its allied databases such as Compustat. The school also has access to EconLit, Bloomberg Data and Wind data and CSMAR databases. Students also have access to the online resources of Peking University main campus website in Beijing.

== Collaborations ==
=== Research collaborations ===
PKU Shenzhen's School of Environmental Engineering houses the Singapore Peking Oxford Research Enterprise (SPORE) program and research center in collaboration with University of Oxford and National University of Singapore and offers joint degree programs.

Other collaborative research centers at PKU Shenzhen include:

- Urban and Regional Planning Co-Research Center, jointly run with University of North Carolina at Chapel Hill
- Hong Kong- Shenzhen Development and Innovation Center with the University of Hong Kong
- Renewable Energy Research Center with University of California, Berkeley

=== Exchange programs ===
The School of Transnational Law has exchange agreements with Bucerius Law School (Germany), Center for Transnational Legal Studies (London), EBS Law School (Germany), Fundação Getulio Vargas Law School of São Paulo (Brazil), International University College of Turin (Italy), Maastricht University (Netherlands), Tel Aviv University(Israel), University of Indiana Maurer School of Law (USA), University of Iowa College of Law (USA), University of Lausanne Faculty of Law and Criminal Justice (Switzerland), University of Miami School of Law (USA), University of San Diego School of Law (USA). Peking University HSBC Business School currently has exchange agreements with over 30 universities all over the globe. Some of them are Frankfurt School of Finance, University of California, Davis, Zurich University of Applied Sciences, College of William and Mary (USA), Tulane University A.B. Freeman School of Business, Universidad de Monterrey (Mexico), University of Cologne, University of Western Sydney etc.

HSBC Business School has dual degree agreements with the University of Hong Kong, Chinese University of Hong Kong, University of Cambridge, National University of Singapore and a joint MBA program with Hong Kong University of Science and Technology.

== Athletics ==
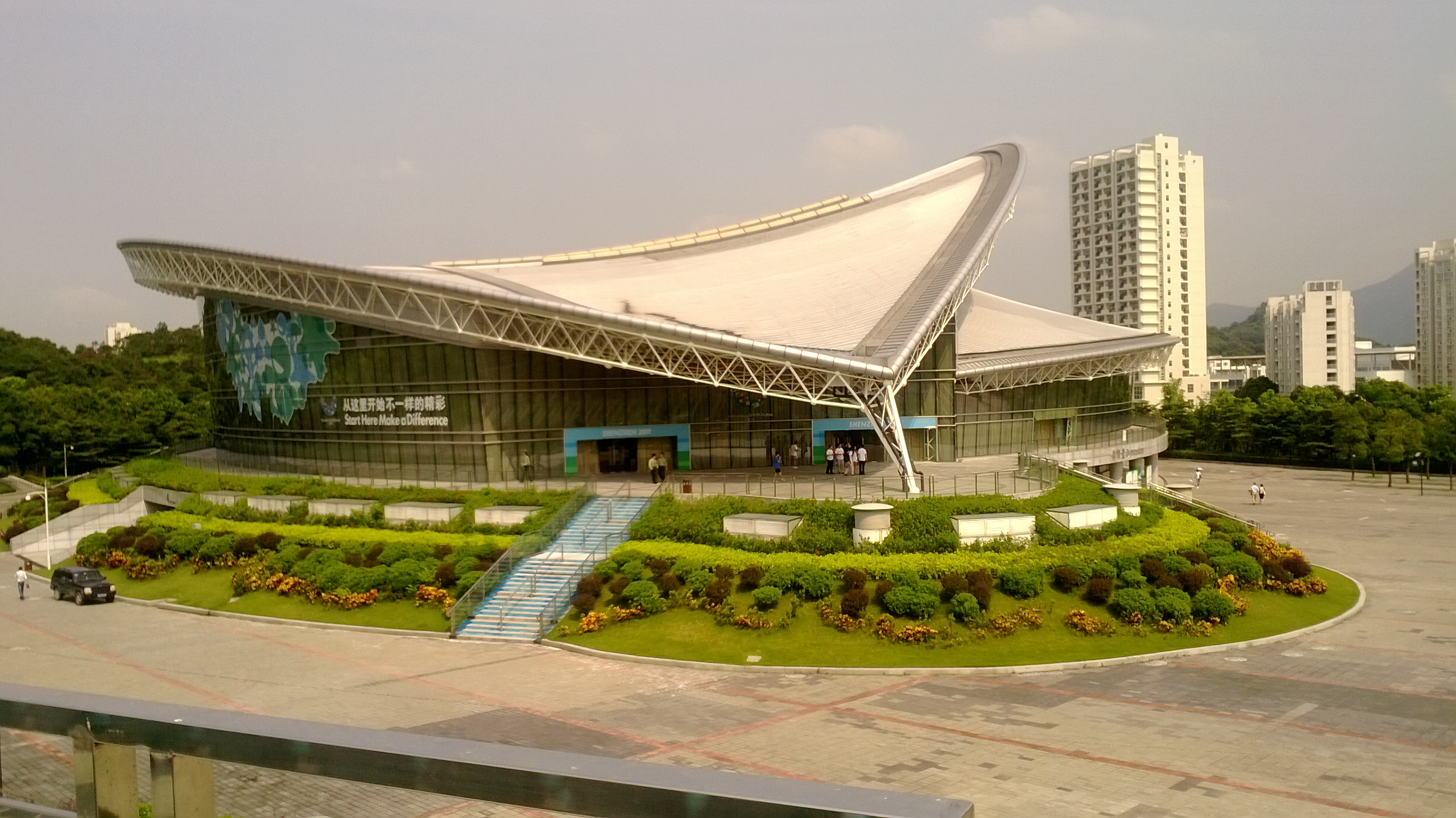
University Town Gymnasium spread over 3 floors with indoor basketball and badminton courts

University Town Stadium with the swimming pool in the background

Peking University Shenzhen constantly participates in Peking University Track and Field events as well as several inter-university events in China. Peking University Shenzhen has formal teams for more than 20 athletic events including basketball, football, table tennis, rowing etc. Peking University Shenzhen won several awards at the 2012 PKU Track and Field competition and its rowing team was placed second at the University Town Rowing Competition.

The athletics and sports facilities of PKU Shenzhen include a standard 400 m athletic track, a soccer field, four tennis courts, three basketball courts, a world class gymnasium, four badminton courts etc. PKU Shenzhen students also have access to common sports facilities of the University Town of Shenzhen which include several tennis courts, a 4000-seat Olympic standard stadium and Olympic standard swimming pool.

== People ==
=== Notable faculty ===
Some of PKU Shenzhen's present faculty members include:

- Wen Hai: Founder of China Center for Economic Research and former vice-president of Peking University.
- Fan Gang: Renowned economist and Secretary General of China Reform Foundation.
- Philip McConnaughay: Former Dean of the Dickinson School of Law at Pennsylvania State University.
- Stephen Yandle: Former Associate Dean of Yale Law School.
- Chen Shiyi: Renowned physicist and former Alonzo G. Decker Jr. Chair professor at Johns Hopkins University.

Former notable faculty members include Jeffrey S. Lehman, former President of Cornell University, Charles Ogletree, former visiting professor at School of Transnational Law and Jesse Climenko, professor at Harvard Law School.

== See also ==
- Peking University
- China Center for Economic Research
- Peking University HSBC Business School
- C9 League
- Peking University School of Transnational Law
