= Philip McConnaughay =

American academic administrator

Philip McConnaughay is an American legal scholar and academic administrator known for his work in international commercial dispute resolution, arbitration, and transnational legal education. He serves as Dean Emeritus and Professor of Law at the Peking University School of Transnational Law (STL) in Shenzhen and is a former vice-chancellor of Peking University's Shenzhen Graduate School. He is among the few foreign nationals to have held a senior leadership role at Peking University.

Prior to joining Peking University, McConnaughay served as dean of Penn State University’s Dickinson School of Law, as founding dean of Penn State's School of International Affairs, and as a professor at the University of Illinois, Urbana-Champaign, College of Law. Before entering academia full-time, he was a partner at the international law firm Morrison & Foerster, where he practiced in San Francisco, Washington, D.C., Tokyo and Hong Kong.

== Education ==
McConnaughay received his B.A. and J.D. (Juris Doctor) degrees from the University of Illinois, Urbana-Champaign.

== Career ==
=== Early Career and Legal Practice ===
Immediately after law school, McConnaughay served as a Law Clerk to The A.Y. Kirkland of the United States District Court for the Northern District of Illinois in Chicago. He then joined Morrison & Foerster in San Francisco as an associate.

He left the firm in 1983 to serve for a year as Special Deputy General Counsel of the United States Equal Employment Opportunity Commission in Washington, D.C., then returned to Morrison & Foerster in Washington, D.C. as a partner, where he was involved principally in complex antitrust and intellectual property litigation. In 1987, he transferred to Morrison & Foerster's Tokyo office, where he participated in the representation of Fujitsu Ltd. in its worldwide arbitration with IBM concerning the intellectual property ownership of mainframe computer operating system software. The dispute is frequently cited for its innovative procedural structure, combining arbitration, mediation, and negotiation to manage a complex multinational commercial conflict. The outcome of the dispute is noteworthy for its significant contributions to legal principles governing the scope of legally permissible interoperability.

=== UIUC and Penn State ===
McConnaughay left the practice of law in 1995 to join the University of Illinois, Urbana-Champaign, College of Law as a professor. He later became the first dean appointed by Penn State University of The Dickinson School of Law, with which Penn State recently had merged. While serving as dean, McConnaughay established a new campus of the law school at Penn State's flagship University Park campus and served as founding dean of Penn State's School of International Affairs. Both programs involved innovative approaches to accreditation, distance learning, and interdisciplinary study.

=== Peking University ===
In 2012, McConnaughay joined Peking University's School of Transnational Law in Shenzhen, succeeding founding dean Jeffrey Lehman, a former president of Cornell University and dean of the University of Michigan Law School. STL had been established in 2008 with authorization from China’s State Council to create an American-style legal education program in China. The school initially sought accreditation from the American Bar Association (ABA), but after the ABA declined to extend accreditation jurisdiction outside the United States and Puerto Rico, STL refined its mission.

Under McConnaughay’s leadership, STL developed a dual-degree structure that combines a U.S.-style Juris Doctor (JD) curriculum with a China Law Juris Master (JM) degree. The program integrates the case-study and Socratic methods characteristic of American legal education with Chinese legal training, while emphasizing transnational law practice that takes account of divergent legal traditions and cultures. The program serves as a model of graduate professional degrees in China, where the study of law traditionally culminated in a research doctorate.STL graduates go on to employment in major international law firms, multinational corporations, government offices, and NGOss.

== Scholarship ==
McConnaughay is the author and editor of numerous scholarly articles and books addressing international commercial arbitration, regulation of international commerce, and the interaction between legal traditions.

His work frequently challenges assumptions about convergence toward Western legal models, emphasizing instead the importance of institutional mechanisms such as international arbitration under the 1958 New York Convention that preserve flexibility and respect for differing legal systems.

His scholarship bridges theory and practice, drawing on his experience as both a law firm partner and academic leader. His published articles analyze topics such as party autonomy in arbitration, the management of complex multinational disputes, comparative approaches to commercial regulation, and the institutional development of dispute-resolution mechanisms in emerging economies.

In addition to his journal articles, McConnaughay has edited and contributed to scholarly volumes addressing human rights legislation in Africa, the values governing research at major U.S. research universities, and international arbitration and dispute settlement in Asia. These edited collections bring together leading scholars and practitioners to examine evolving norms in international trade, arbitration, and economic governance.

McConnaughay has authored law review articles addressing party autonomy, economic regulation, and cross-border commercial relations. Among his widely cited works are “The Risks and Virtues of Lawlessness: A “Second Look” at International Commercial Arbitration,” published in Northwestern University Law Review (1999);“The Scope of Autonomy in International Contracts and its Relation to Economic Regulation and Development,” in the Columbia Journal of Transnational Law (2001); “Rethinking the Role of Law and Contracts in East-West Commercial Relations,” in the Virginia Journal of International Law (2001); and “Reviving the Public Law Taboo in International Conflict of Laws,” in the Stanford Journal of International Law (1999).

His later scholarship has focused increasingly on arbitration’s role in economic development and institutional design. In “The Role of Arbitration in Economic Development and the Creation of Transnational Legal Principles,” published in the Peking University Transnational Law Review (2013), and “The Potential of Private Commercial Arbitration for Facilitating Economic Growth in Less Developed Countries,” an invited chapter in the proceedings of the 2016 Congress of the International Council for Commercial Arbitration (Kluwer, 2017), McConnaughay argues that arbitration mechanisms can contribute to the national legal infrastructure essential for economic development and the emergence of transnational legal norms.

He has also written extensively on legal education reform in China and Asia. His co-authored chapters with Colleen B. Toomey include “Preparing for the Sinicization of the Western Legal Tradition: The Case of Peking University School of Transnational Law,” published in Legal Education in Asia: From Imitation to Innovation (Brill, 2017), and “China and the Globalization of Legal Education: A Look into the Future,” included in The Globalization of Legal Education (Oxford University Press, 2022). In “The Evolving Mission of Peking University School of Transnational Law,” published in the Journal of Legal Education (2023/2024), he reflects on the development of legal education in China and the adaptation of case study and Socratic questioning pedagogical methods at Peking University.

The scholarly treatises McConnaughay has edited include International Commercial Arbitration in Asia (with Tom Ginsburg; Juris Press, 2002; 2nd ed. 2005); Human Rights, the Rule of Law, and Development in Africa (with Paul Tiyambe Zeleza; University of Pennsylvania Press, 2004); and Defining Values for Research and Technology: The University’s Changing Role (with William T. Greenough and Jay Kesan; Rowman & Littlefield, 2007). He also contributed to the volume Economic Approaches to Law: Dispute Resolution (Edward Elgar, 2009), and wrote the foreword to Won Kidane’s Dispute Settlement in China–Africa Economic Relations (Kluwer Law International, 2011).

He served on the editorial board of the Indonesian Journal of International & Comparative Law and advised the government of Indonesia on drafting national arbitration legislation.

Collectively, McConnaughay’s scholarship explores the intersection of arbitration, economic development, and legal pluralism, emphasizing the importance of institutional mechanisms that accommodate differing legal traditions while fostering predictability and fairness in international commerce.

== Views and opinions ==
McConnaughay has written and spoken extensively about the globalization of legal services and the ethical responsibilities of lawyers operating across jurisdictions. He argues that globalization does not necessarily entail a worldwide convergence of law around the Western legal tradition. Instead, he emphasizes the growing importance and influence of non-Western commercial and legal traditions in cross-border commercial exchange.

He points to the 1958 New York Convention as perhaps the most successful example of a multinational treaty that accommodates plural legal systems and facilitates cross-border commerce and dispute resolution. He argues that legal education also must prepare students to address transactions and disputes involving parties from different cultural and legal traditions, and he has positioned STL as an experimental model for such preparation.

McConnaughay has also commented on the development of the Guangdong–Hong Kong–Macao Greater Bay Area, highlighting the importance of legal services and higher education autonomy in sustaining technological innovation and economic growth.
