= Suzhou University (Anhui) =

Public university in Suzhou, Anhui, China

- 宿州学院
- Motto: 友善、博学、务实、奋进
- Motto in English: transl. Friendly, Erudite, Pragmatic, and Enterprising
- Type: Public
- Established: 1949; 77 years ago
- President: Min Jie (闵杰)
- Party Secretary: Li Hong (李红)
- Total staff: 1,300 (Sep. 2025)
- Undergraduates: 16,000 (Sep. 2025)
- Location: Suzhou, Anhui, China; 33°38′05″N 117°04′18″E
- Campus: 74.6 hectares (184 acres); multiple sites
- Website: https://www.ahszu.edu.cn

Suzhou University is a provincial public undergraduate college in Suzhou, Anhui, China.

== History ==
In 1949, the Su County United Middle School (皖北宿县联合中学) established an affiliated Teacher Training Department (师范部). After separating from the school in 1950, the department became the North Anhui Su County Division Normal School (皖北宿县区师范学校), with Pei Ganyuan (裴干元) as its first principal. It was renamed the North Anhui Su County Normal School (皖北区宿县师范学校) later that year.

On 1 May 1952, the school moved to Sanliwan (三里湾) in the southeast of Su County and was renamed the Anhui Su County Normal School (安徽省宿县师范学校).

In February 1983, the school was renamed Suzhou Teachers College (宿州师范专科学校) following its reorganization as a three-year normal college. The Suzhou Agricultural Cadre School (宿州市农业干部学校) was merged into the college in 2002.

In May 2004, it was established as a comprehensive four-year undergraduate university and renamed Suzhou University.

== Campuses ==
Suzhou University operates two campuses: the Bianhe Road campus and the Education Park campus (also known as East campus). The university covers a total area of approximately 1,146 mu (74.6 hectares), with a building area of nearly 600,000 square meters.

== Schools and departments ==
The university offers 64 undergraduate majors through its 15 schools, covering eight major disciplines: engineering, management, science, literature, economics, art, education and medicine.

- School of Marxism
- School of Literature and Communication
- School of Foreign Studies
- Business School
- School of Management
- Conservatory of Music
- School of Fine Arts and Design
- School of Mathematics and Statistics
- School of Mechanical and Electronic Engineering
- School of Biological and Food Engineering
- School of Chemistry and Chemical Engineering
- School of Resources and Civil Engineering
- School of Environment and Surveying Engineering
- School of Information Engineering
- Department of Physical Education

=== Pearl S. Buck Institute ===
The Pearl S. Buck Institute (also known as the Pearl S. Buck Memorial Hall) was established in 2003. It was initially created to conduct research on Pearl S. Buck's novel The Good Earth, which is set in a village in Suzhou, Anhui. The institute's scope later expanded to encompass all of her literary works.

== Notable faculty and alumni ==
- Yang Liwei – Honorary professor of Suzhou University.
- Tong Huaiwei – Vice chairperson of the 11th Anhui Provincial Committee of the CPPCC.
- Chen Chaoying – Former Deputy Director-General of Department of Civil Affairs of Anhui Province.
- Meng Er-dong – Professor in Department of Chinese Language and Literature, Peking University.
- Xiao Jianguo – Former Ambassador Extraordinary and Plenipotentiary of the People's Republic of China to Brunei Darussalam.
