= Shenzhen University =

Public university in Shenzhen, Guangdong, China

Coordinates: 22.539256°N 113.933684°E

- 深圳大学
- Motto: 自立，自律，自强
- Motto in English: Self-reliance, Self-discipline, Self-improvement
- Type: Public
- Established: September 27, 1983; 43 years ago
- Affiliations: Guangdong-Hong Kong-Macao University Alliance (GHMUA)
- Endowment: ¥1.11 billion (2019)
- Budget: ¥6.08 billion (2020)
- President: Mao Junfa
- Vice-president: Du Hongbiao, Xu Chen, Wang Hui, Li Yonghua, Zhang Xueji
- Party Secretary: Li Qingquan
- Faculty: 3,776
- Students: 35,455
- Undergraduates: 28,674
- Postgraduates: 6,433
- Location: Shenzhen, Guangdong, China
- Campus: Suburban, 2.90 km^{2} (1.12 sq mi)
- Colors: Lychee Red
- Mascot: Li-Li (励励)
- Website: szu.edu.cn en.szu.edu.cn

Chinese name
- Simplified Chinese: 深圳大学
- Traditional Chinese: 深圳大學
Transcriptions
Standard Mandarin
- Hanyu Pinyin: Shēnzhèn Dàxué
Yue: Cantonese
- Jyutping: sam1 zan3 daai6 hok6

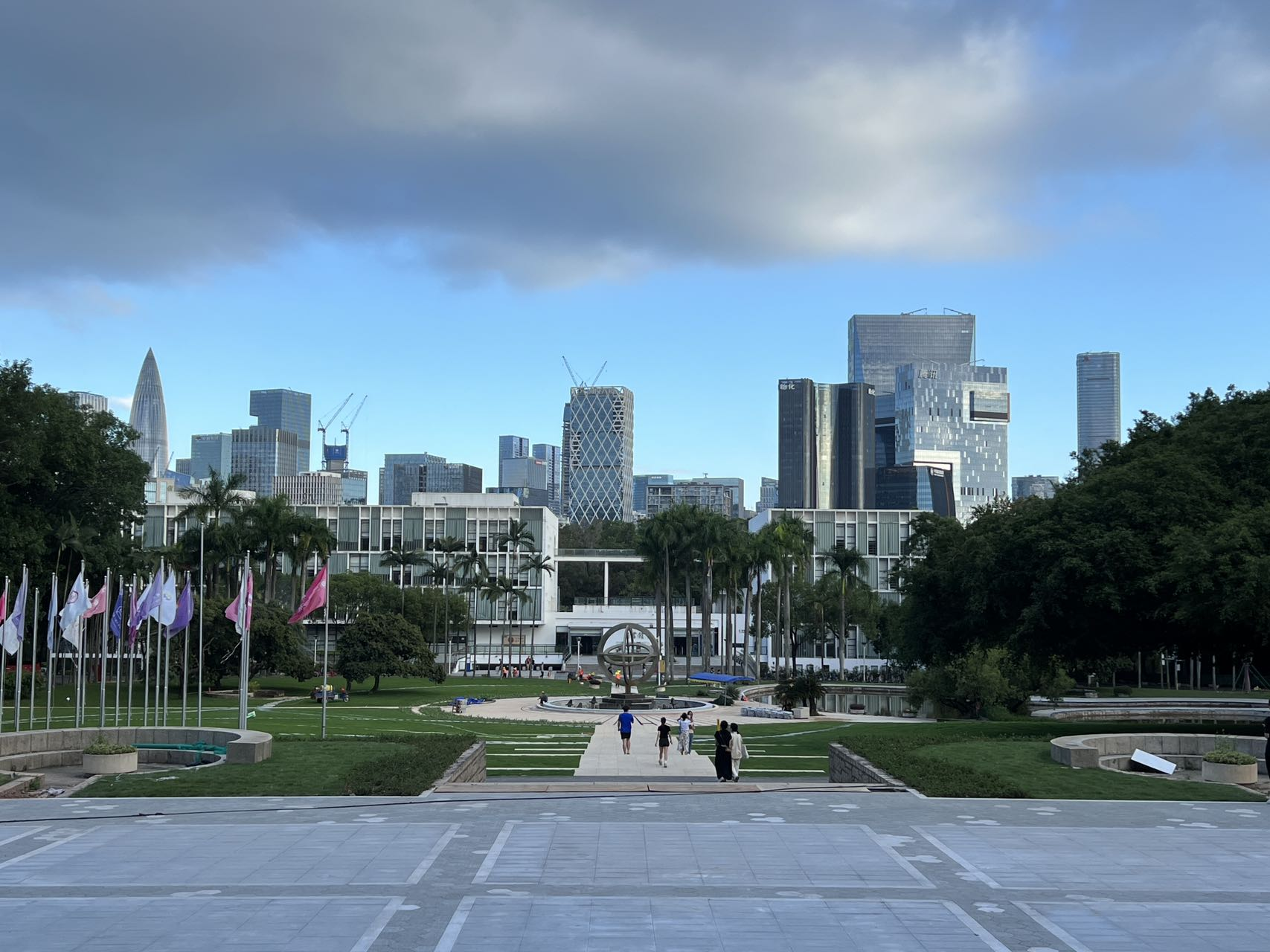
Central Plaza of Yuehai Campus, Shenzhen University

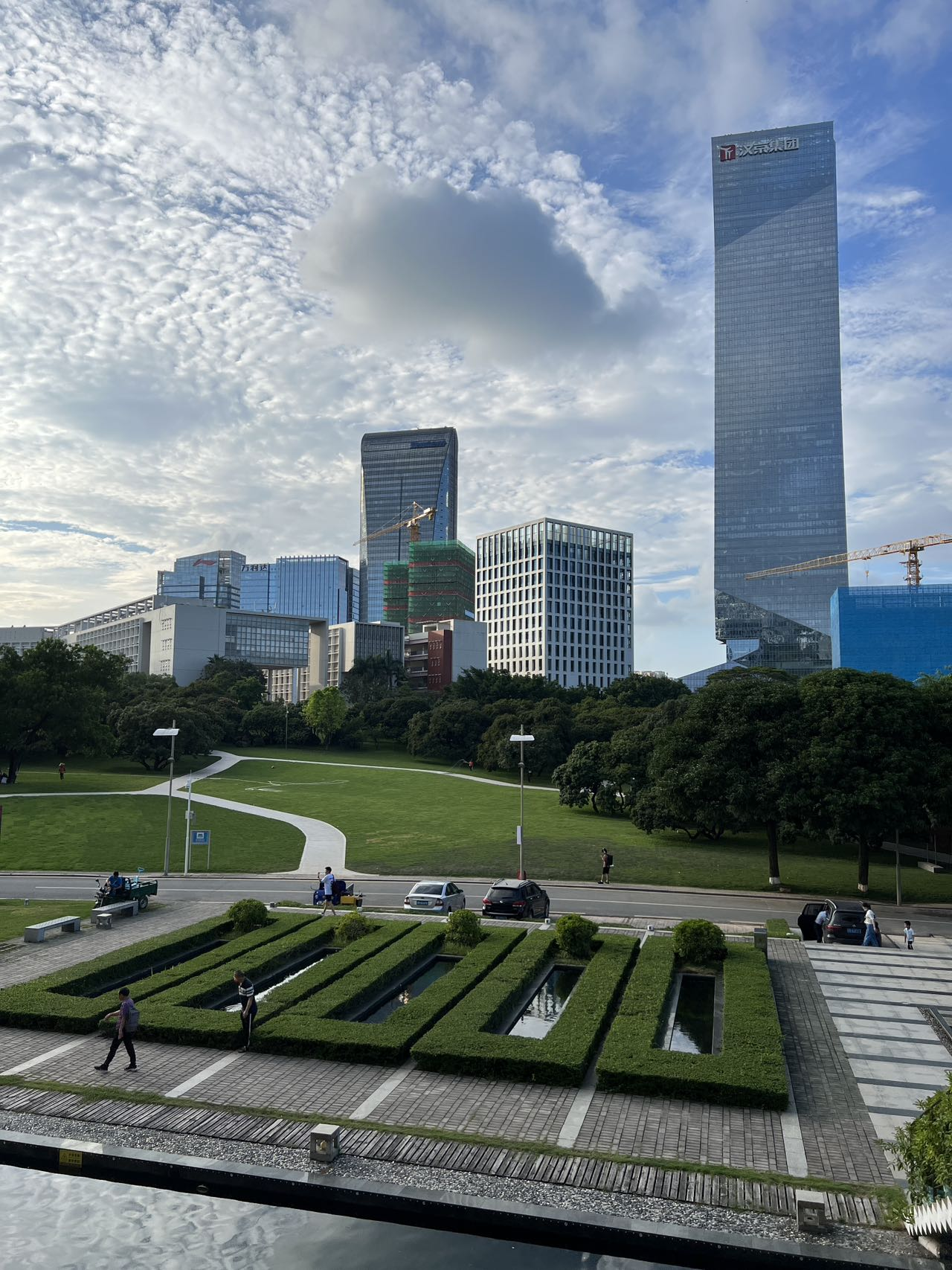
Building of Humanities Yuehai Campus, Shenzhen University

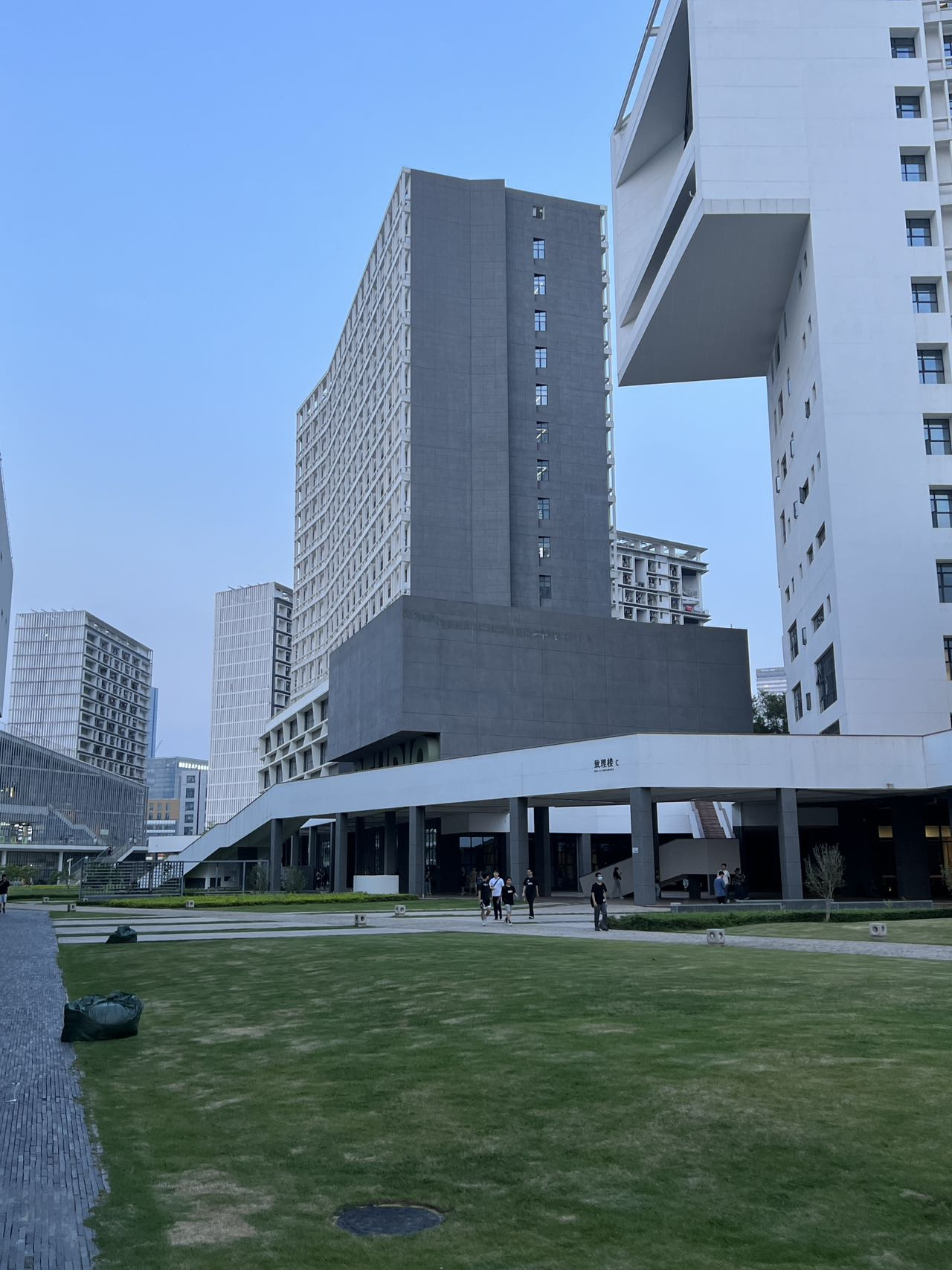
Southern Area of Yuehai Campus, Shenzhen University

Shenzhen University (SZU, Chinese: 深圳大学; pinyin: Shēnzhèn Dàxué) is a municipal public research university in Shenzhen, Guangdong, China. The university is funded by the Shenzhen Municipal People's Government.

== Location ==
SZU comprises two campuses, Houhai campus and Xili campus, occupying 2.72 square kilometers in total. The Houhai campus is located on the coastline of Houhai Bay with 1.34 square kilometers. The new Xili campus now under construction is located in the city's University Town and takes up 1.38 square kilometers.

== History ==
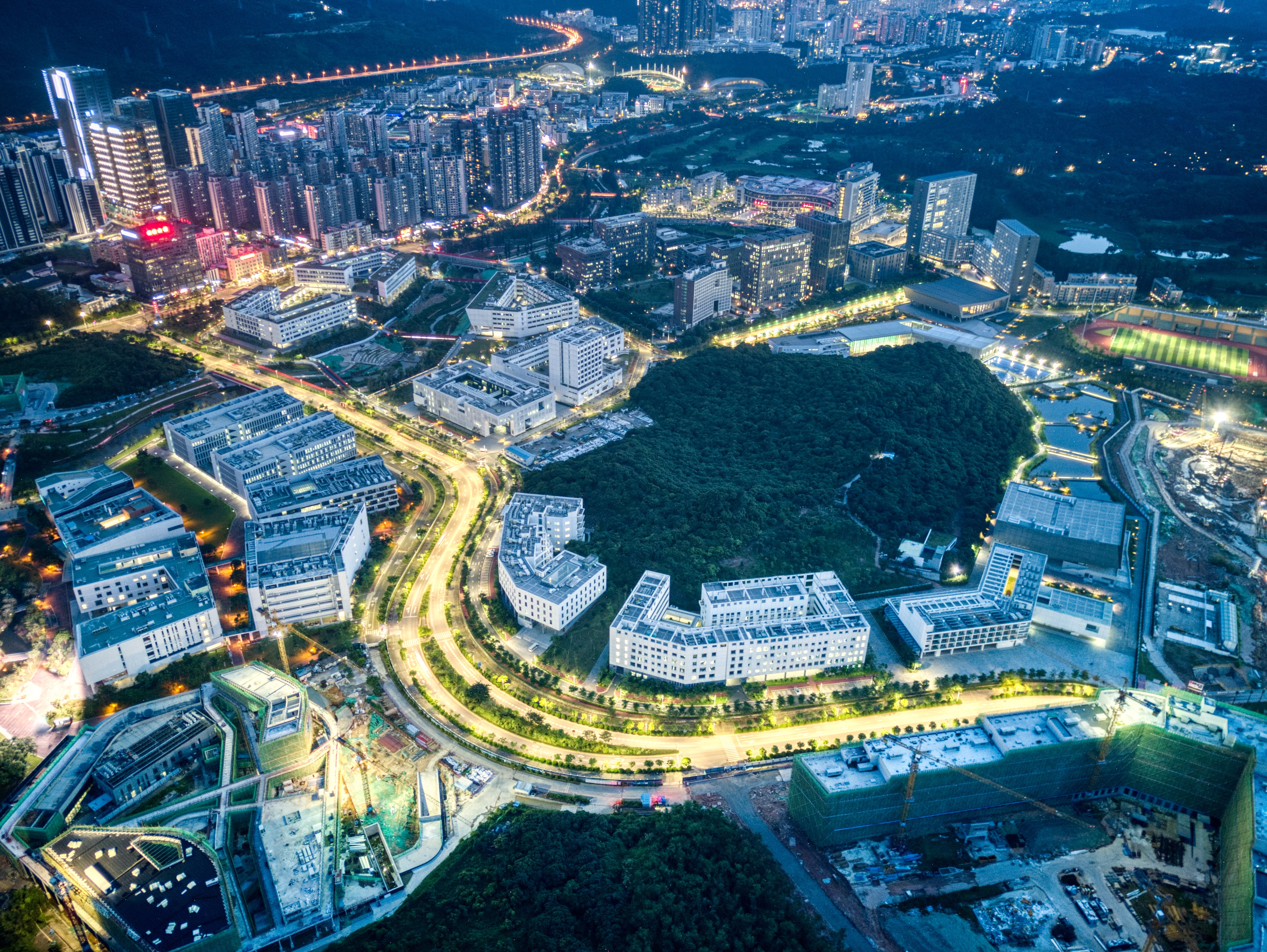
Aerial Night View of SZU Xili Campus

Shenzhen University was established in 1983 as a full-time comprehensive university, in line with the aim of China's Ministry of Education to further develop the critical infrastructure in the Special Economic Zone of Shenzhen with strong support from Chinese leading universities including Peking University, Tsinghua University and Renmin University of China. Deng Xiaoping gave his personal approval to the university. Professor Zhang Wei, who was the former vice-president of Tsinghua University, an academician of the Chinese Academy of Sciences and the Chinese Academy of Engineering, was appointed as the first president.

In 1995, Shenzhen University passed the teaching evaluation for the undergraduate program accredited by the Ministry of Education and was among the first group of universities in China to have its undergraduate programs certified. In 1996, Shenzhen University was accredited by the Academic Degree Evaluation Committee of the State Council for Master's programs. In 1997, Shenzhen University reorganized into the faculty and college structure, adopted a work-study program and committed to an integrated approach to teaching.

Since 2017, the university has concentrated on research-oriented teaching and has invested in research laboratories. In 2017, the research budget totaled 9.705 million RMB. In 2024, Nobel Prize laureate Barry Marshall was appointed as a chair professor at SZU. Many businesses and academics have made donations to support the development of Shenzhen University, and some entrepreneurs have set up funds and scholarships in various disciplines. Shenzhen University has 26 PhD programs as of 2025.

== Administration ==
=== Faculty departmental structure ===
SZU now has 27 schools (colleges), providing 96 undergraduate majors, 38 first-grade master's degree conferring disciplines; 18 professional master's degree conferring disciplines and 10 first-grade doctoral degrees.

| Normal College | School of Humanities | College of International Studies | School of Media and Communication |
|---|---|---|---|
| Education Technology; Sports Education; Sports Training; Music; Choreography; Performance; Fine Arts; Music Performance; TCSOL (Teaching Chinese to Speakers of Other Languages); Leisure Sports; Business Administration (Golf Administration) | Chinese Language and Literature; History; Philosophy; Elite Class of Traditional Chinese Studies | English; Japanese; French; Spanish; German | Advertising; Journalism; Broadcasting; Internet & New Media |
| College of Economics | College of Management | Law School | College of Art and Design |
| Economics; Logistics; International Finance and Trade; Accounting; Finance | Business Management Marketing; Human Resource; Management; Administration; E-Commerce Information Management and Information System | Law | Art Design; Graphic Design; Environmental Design; Product Design; Fashion Design; Digital Media Art |
| College of Materials Science and Engineering | College of Physics & Energy | College of Chemistry and Environmental Engineering | School of Mathematical Sciences |
| Materials Science and Engineering; Polymer Materials and Engineering | Physics; Nuclear Engineering and Nuclear Technology | Chemistry; Environmental Engineering; Food Science and Engineering; New Energy Science and Engineering | Mathematics and Applied Mathematics; Information and Computing Science; Statistics |
| College of Information Engineering | College of Computer Science & Software Engineering | School of Architecture and Urban Planning | College of Civil Engineering |
| Electronic and Information Engineering; Communication Engineering | Computer Science and Technology; Software Engineering | Architecture; Urban and Rural Planning; Landscape Garden; Geospatial Information Engineering | Civil Engineering; Traffic Engineering; Engineering Management |
| College of Mechatronics and Control Engineering | College of Electronic Science and Technology | College of Life Sciences and Oceanography | College of Optoelectronic Engineering |
| Machinery Design, Manufacture and Automation; Automation | Electronic Science and Technology; Microelectronics Science and Engineering | Biotechnology; Marine Sciences; Biological Engineering | Measurement, Control Technology and Instruments; Opto-electronics Information Science and Engineering |
| Health Science Center | College of Psychology and Sociology | Institute for Advanced Study | Other colleges |
| Clinical Medicine; Biomedical Engineering; Pharmacy; Nursing; Stomatology | Psychology; Sociology | Science and Technology Innovation Experimental Class; Financial Technology Experiment Class | Shenzhen Audencia Business School; College of Entrepreneurship; College of Continuing Education; College of International Exchange; Graduate School; Tokyo College |

=== Staff ===
The faculty consists of 3,455 staff. There are 2,267 teachers, 561 technicians, 627 administrative staff, 782 postdoctoral researchers, 220 full-time researchers, 119 visiting professors and 228 foreign teachers. It has 1 Nobel Prize laureate, 7 academicians in the Chinese Academy of Engineering, and 10 academicians in both the Chinese Academy of Sciences and the Chinese Academy of Engineering.

=== Research ===
In 2025, Shenzhen University ranked 56th globally and 30th in mainland China in the Nature Index. From 2020 to 2024, it received RMB 9.271 billion in S&T funding; undertook 124 National Key R&D projects and 5 National Major S&T projects; secured 1,763 NSFC grants; won 3 national and 89 provincial/ministerial S&T awards; published 32,398 SCI-indexed papers; and obtained 5,679 patents (4,410 invention). In the social sciences, it received RMB 320 million; undertook 178 NSSF projects and 100 MOE HSS projects; published 3,736 SSCI/A&HCI papers; and won 17 national awards. The university publishes the Journal of Shenzhen University (Science and Engineering) and the Journal of Shenzhen University (Humanities and Social Sciences).

Research Institutions
| China Center for Special Economic Zone Research | | Research Centre for Language & Cognition | |
| Collaborative Innovation Centre for Optoelectronic Science and Technology | Center for Media and Social Changes | Center for China's Overseas Interest | Key Laboratory For Advanced Manufacturing Technology for Mold & Die |
| Institute for Urban Planning Design & Research | Institute for Nano Surface Science & Engineering | Institute for Cultural Industries | Immigration Culture Research Centre |

=== Library ===
Shenzhen University library holds a collection of 51202 million items (including Phase I project of Xili campus library), consisting of 4,007,900 million paper resources and there are 257 kinds of databases, which include 2,325,500 full-text e-books in Chinese and foreign languages and 124,800 e-journal are accessible via personal computers and Internet library terminals. The campus has 30,000 Internet connections and 99 percent of its classrooms and lecture halls have been digitized.

=== Students ===
As of 2025, Shenzhen University has 48,865 students enrolled in regular higher education programs, including 29,869 undergraduates, 16,575 master's students, 1,601 doctoral students, and 820 international students.

It has granted diplomas to 2,000 graduates from the Hong Kong and Macao Special Administrative Regions as well as Taiwan. Shenzhen University has also established "dual-campus" joint-programs for undergraduate degrees with institutions in Great Britain and other foreign countries. There are up to 2,500 students that graduated from these joint programs since the university's inception, and the quality of programs has been accredited by the British Council. Shenzhen University participates with annual exchanges students and teachers with its sister universities in the United States of America, Great Britain, Japan, and South Korea.

== Rankings and reputation ==
University rankings
| BCUR National | Domestic | 72 |
| Wu Shulian National | Domestic | 58 |
| QS National | General | 27 |
| THE National | General | 29 |
| QS Asia (Asia version) | General | =155 |
| THE Asia (Asia version) | General | 88 |
| ARWU World | Research | 151–200 |
| QS World | General | =452 |
| THE World | General | 351–400 |
| USNWR World | General | =156 |

As of 2025, Shenzhen University was ranked # 151 by the Academic Ranking of World Universities and # 156 globally by the U.S. News & World Report Best Global University Ranking.

The 2024 CWTS Leiden Ranking ranked Shenzhen University 95th in the world by total publications and 100th in the world based on the number of their scientific publications belonging to the top 1% in their fields for the time period 2019–2022.

=== Nature Index ===
Nature Index tracks the affiliations of high-quality scientific articles and presents research outputs by institution and country on a monthly basis. SZU ranked 10th in the world for Nature Index 2021 Young Universities (Leading 150 Young Universities). It ranked #57 in the world, and #32 in the Asia-Pacific region for Nature Index Research Leaders 2025.

| Year | Rank | Valuer |
|---|---|---|
| 2021 | 10 | Nature Index 2021 Young Universities (Leading 150 Young Universities) |
| 2025 | 28 | Nature Index – Academic Institutions – China |
| 2025 | 32 | Nature Index – Academic Institutions – Asia-Pacific |
| 2025 | 57 | Nature Index – Academic Institutions – Global |

=== Notable alumni ===
- Ma Huateng, Chinese entrepreneur, founder of Tencent.

== Hospitals ==
=== Shenzhen Second People's Hospital ===
Shenzhen Second People's Hospital (First Affiliated Hospital of Shenzhen University) was founded in 1980. In 1996, it was designated a national Class III Grade A hospitals secondly in Shenzhen.

=== Shenzhen University General Hospital ===
Shenzhen University General Hospital is a Class III Grade A hospital occupying nearly 90,000 square meters and built in two phases. Phase I was completed in September 2017, with a floor area of about 140,000 square meters and 800 approved beds. Upon completion of Phase II, new inpatient buildings and teaching–research facilities will be added, bringing the total to 1,400 beds and approximately 265,000 square meters of floor area.

=== Shenzhen University-affiliated South China Hospital ===
Shenzhen University Affiliated South China Hospital is a municipally owned public hospital prioritized by the Shenzhen municipal government. Located on Pinghu Subdistrict, Longgang District, it has a floor area of about 327,700 square meters, with 1,500 beds completed in Phase I.

== Affiliated schools ==
- The Affiliated High School of Shenzhen University (深圳大学附属中学)

== See also ==
- List of universities in China
- Higher education in China
- Education in China
- Shenzhen University Medical School
