= Wu Yundong =

Chinese chemist

Wu Yundong (Chinese: 吴云东) is a Chinese chemist. He is a theoretical organic chemist based in the Hong Kong University of Science and Technology and holds a concurrent position in Peking University.

== Background and education ==
He was born 10 May 1957 in Liyang, Jiangsu, China. He graduated with a BS from Lanzhou University in 1982 and received his PhD in 1986 from the University of Pittsburgh, working with Kendall N. Houk in computational organic chemistry.

== Career ==
He went on to become a research associate in University of California Los Angeles from 1989 to 1992, before beginning his independent research career in Hong Kong. His research interest focuses mainly on the elucidation of reaction mechanisms, protein-protein interactions/aggregations (Alzheimer's disease etc.) and conformational features of natural and unnatural peptides.

== Awards ==
Wu has received various awards in his career; in December 2005, he was elected as an Academician of the prestigious Chinese Academy of Sciences. In 2017, Wu became a laureate of the Asian Scientist 100 by the Asian Scientist.
