= Peking University School of Transnational Law =

Law school in Shenzhen, China

Coordinates: 22.5920°N 113.9809°E

The Peking University School of Transnational Law (STL or PKUSTL) (Chinese: 北京大学国际法学院) is located within the campus of the Peking University Shenzhen Graduate School in Nanshan District, Shenzhen, Guangdong Province, China. The school's inaugural class started in the fall of 2008. It is the first law school to offer a traditional US-style Juris Doctor (J.D.) degree (in English) alongside a Chinese-style Juris Master (J.M.) degree (in Mandarin). The program is four years and graduates will receive both the Chinese Juris Master's degree and an ABA unrecognized J.D. degree. STL also offers a 3-year J.D. degree in English and a 2-year Master of Laws (LL.M.) degree. The school's tagline is "China's most innovative law school in China's most innovative city". The School is partly run by bringing in emeritus professors from American institutions.

Jeffrey S. Lehman is the founding dean. Philip McConnaughay was the dean until 2024. Mark Feldman is the current interim dean.

== Admissions ==
Admission to STL is subject to a rigorous admissions procedure. Admissions is on a rolling basis but the deadline is late March each year.

In 2015, STL established a post-graduate LL.M. (Master of Laws) degree for foreign students who already have a first degree in law and who already may be practicing lawyers in their home nations.

== Distinguished faculty ==
STL's full-time resident faculty includes scholars of the future of law practice, international trade law, food safety policy, public international law, technology, and alternative dispute resolution, along with scholars of investment treaty arbitration, capital markets, securities regulation, comparative corporate governance, Chinese legal history and philosophy, Chinese environmental regulation and administrative law, China civil law, and several other fields of law. The faculty is multinational in background and follows a Western-style interactive Socratic teaching methodology.

== Competitions and student organizations ==
STL sponsors students to compete in several moot court competitions, including Jessup International Moot Court Competition, Vis (east) International Commercial Arbitration Moot, Red Cross International Humanitarian Law Competition, International Criminal Court (ICC) Trial Competition and ELSA WTO Moot Court Competition. STL participates in Law Without Walls program. STL has several student organizations, including Public Interest Law Foundation (PILF), Society of Women in Law, The Journal of Transnational Law, etc.
