= Harbin Institute of Technology, Shenzhen =

Satellite campus of Harbin Institute of Technology in Shenzhen, China

- 哈尔滨工业大学（深圳）
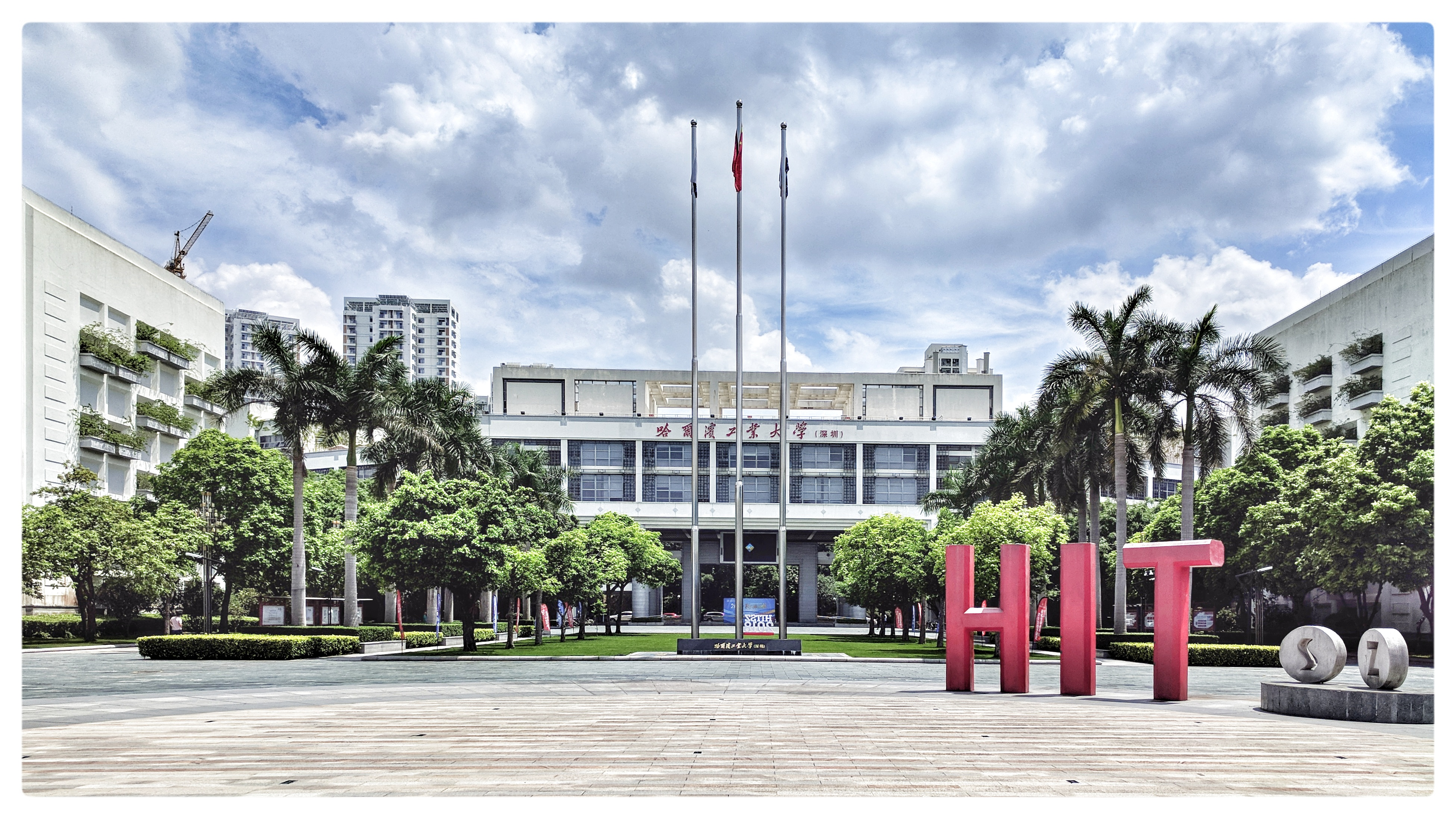
- Type: Satellite campus
- Established: 2002; 24 years ago
- Location: Shenzhen, Guangdong, China; 22°35′25″N 113°57′52″E
- Website: HITSZ English Website; HITSZ Chinese Website

Chinese name
- Simplified Chinese: 哈尔滨工业大学（深圳）
- Traditional Chinese: 哈爾濱工業大學（深圳）
- Literal meaning: Harbin Institute of Technology (Shenzhen)
Transcriptions
Standard Mandarin
- Hanyu Pinyin: Hā'ěrbīn Gōngyè Dàxué (Shēnzhèn)
Yue: Cantonese
- Jyutping: haa1 ji5 ban1 gung1 jip6 daai6 hok6 sam1 zan3

The Harbin Institute of Technology, Shenzhen (HITSZ; Chinese: 哈尔滨工业大学（深圳）) is a satellite campus of the Harbin Institute of Technology in Shenzhen, Guangdong, China.

== Departments ==
Nine departments and one institute comprise the HIT Shenzhen Graduate School offering master's and doctoral programs:

- School of Computer Science and Technology
- School of Electronic and Information Engineering
- School of Mechanical Engineering and Automation
- School of Civil and Environmental Engineering
- School of Materials Science and Engineering
- School of Architecture
- School of Economics and Management
- School of Sciences
- School of Humanities and Social Sciences
- The Institute of Space Science and Applied Technology
