= Xili Subdistrict, Shenzhen =

Area of Shenzhen, China

Coordinates: 22°32′14″N 113°55′00″E

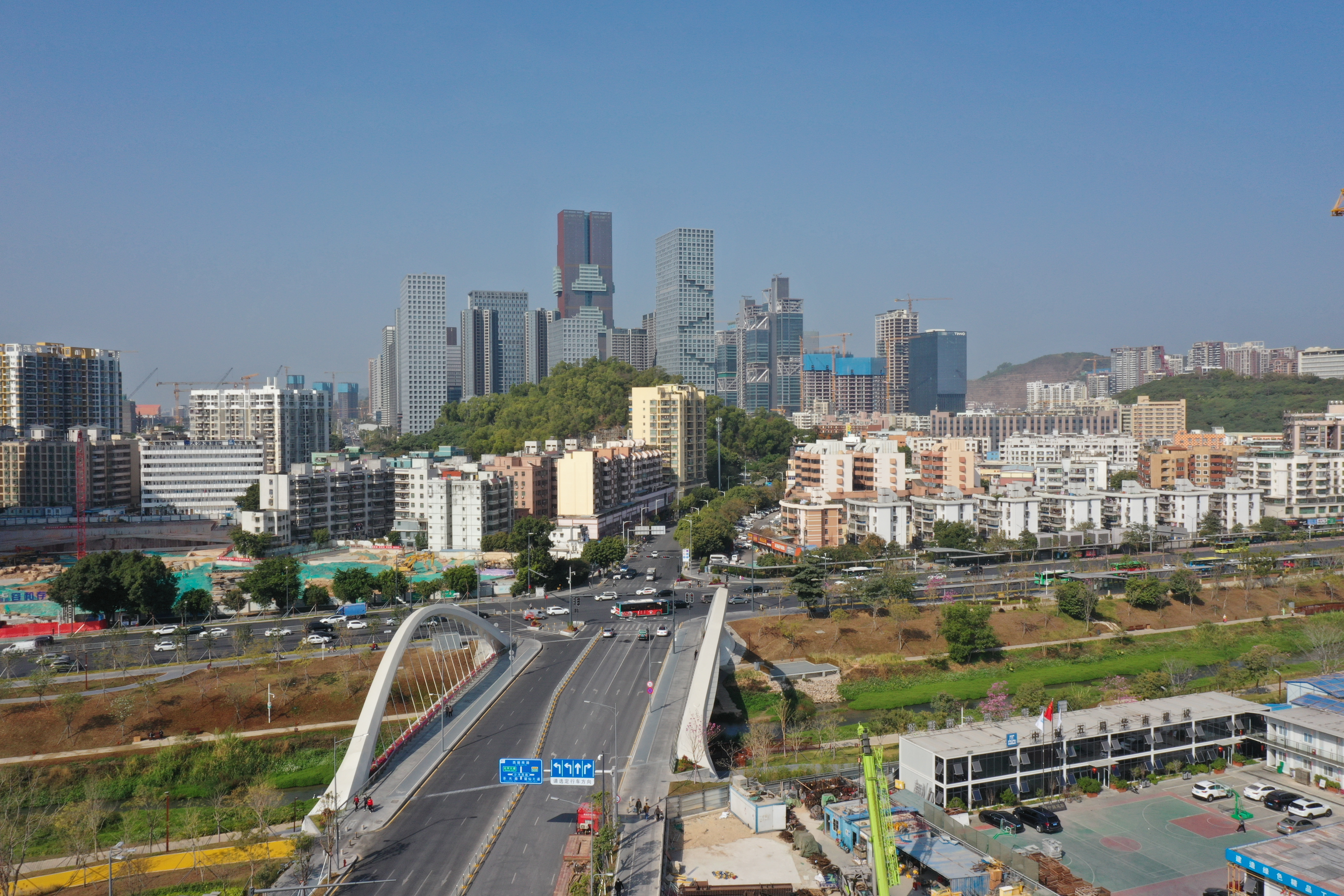
- Simplified Chinese: 西丽
- Traditional Chinese: 西麗
Transcriptions
Standard Mandarin
- Hanyu Pinyin: Xīlì
Yue: Cantonese
- Jyutping: sai1 lai6

Xili (Chinese: 西丽), an area of Nanshan District, Shenzhen, South China, covers an area of 46.93 square kilometres (505,200,000 sq ft), with a population of 210,000 or more, including household population of 19,323. It has eight communities - Dakan, Makan, Baimang, Lihu, Xinwei, Xili, Shuguang and Songping Shan. The bordering areas are Taoyuan (Grand Sand River as the boundary), Yuehai (Beihuan Expressway as the boundary) and Nantou (Unicorn Road as the boundary) communities and Bao'an District. Tang Lang New Village (Chinese: 塘朗新村; pinyin: Tánglǎngxīncūn; Jyutping: tong4 long5 san1 cyun1) is also found in Xili. University Town of Shenzhen, apartments for migrant workers and the Xili People's Hospital are located in the area.

== Education ==
Municipal schools

- Shenzhen Second Senior High School (深圳市第二高级中学) - Xili

== See also ==
- University Town of Shenzhen
