= List of Teochew people =

This is a list of notable Teochews.

== Entrepreneurs ==
- Mainland China
  - Huang Guangyu (黄光裕; Ng Guangyu; Wong Kwong Yu) (1969–; Chaoyang, Guangdong), founder and chairman of GOME Group; formerly the richest person in mainland China
  - Ma Huateng (馬化騰/马化腾; Bhê Huejam) (1971–; Chaoyang, Guangdong), One of the top ten richest man in the world, with estimated net worth of US$55.3 billion. He is the founder, chairman and CEO of Tencent, Asia most valuable company by market capitalisation.Tencent is one of the largest Internet and technology companies, and the biggest investment, gaming and entertainment conglomerates in the world.
  - Lin Shouzhi (林受之) (1873–1924), rubber merchant and supporter of Sun Yat-sen
- Hong Kong
  - Charles Heung (向華強)(1948-; Chaozhou, Guangdong; born in Hong Kong) Hong Kong actor-turned-film producer and presenter. Founder of China Star Entertainment Group
  - Li Ka-shing (李嘉誠/李嘉诚; Li Jiacheng; Lee Ka Sing) (1928–; Chaozhou, Guangdong), founder and chairman of Cheung Kong Group; formerly the 8th richest person in the world and formerly the richest person of Chinese and Chinese descent in the world. As of June 2019, he is the 30th richest person in the world, with a current net worth of US$29.4 billion
  - Lim Por-yen (林百欣; Lin Baixin; Lim Bêhyan) (1914–2005; Chaoyang, Guangdong), founder of Lai Sun Group, media tycoon, banker and charitarian
  - Albert Yeung (楊受成/杨受成; Yang Shoucheng; Yêng Siuseng) (1944–; Chaozhou, Guangdong; born in Hong Kong), founder and chairman of Emperor Group
  - Joseph Lau (劉鑾雄/刘銮雄; Liu Luanxong; Liu Luanghiong) (1951–; Chaozhou, Guangdong), founder, chairman and CEO of Chinese Estates Group
  - Vincent Lo (羅康瑞/罗康瑞; Luo Kangri; Lo Kang Sui) (1948–; Puning, Guangdong), founder and chairman of Shui On Group
  - Chau Chak Wing
- Thailand
  - Low Kiok Chiang (1843–1911; born in Swatow, Guangdong), founder of Khiam Hoa Heng entreprises (1872–1950s)
  - Chin Sophonpanich (Thai: ชิน โสภณพนิช; Chinese: 陳弼臣) (1909–1988; Chaoyang, Guangdong; born in Thailand), founder of Bangkok Bank
  - Dhanin Chearavanont (Thai: ธนินท์ เจียรวนนท์; 謝國民/谢国民; Xie Guomin; Zia Gokmi) (1939–; Chenghai, Guangdong), CEO of Charoen Pokphand Group (Chia Tai Group)
  - Prachai Leophai-ratana (Thai: ประชัย เลี่ยวไพรัตน; 廖漢渲/廖汉渲; Liao Hanxuan; Liu Hangsuang) (Chao'an, Guangdong), founder and former CEO of Thai Petrochemical Industry (TPI) and TPI Polene
  - Chatri Sophonpanich (Thai: ชาตรี โสภณพนิช; 陳有漢/陈有汉; Chen Youhan; Tan U-hang) (1934–2018; Chaoyang, Guangdong), CEO of Bangkok Bank
  - Krit Ratanarak (Thai: กฤตย์ รัตนรักษ์;李智正; Li Zhizheng; Li Dizian) (–; Chenghai, Guangdong), CEO of Siam City Cement Public Company Limited and Bank of Ayudhya Public Company Limited
- Singapore
  - Lim Nee Soon (林義順/林义顺; Lin Yishun) (1879–1936; Shantou, Guangdong), Chinese Peranakan banker and businessman, rubber magnate and was nicknamed the "Pineapple King", founding member of Teochew Poit Ip Huay Kuan and close friend of Dr Sun Yat Sen.
  - Lien Ying Chow (連瀛洲/连瀛洲; Lian Yingzhou; Lian Yingzio) (1906–2004; Chaoyang, Guangdong), founder and CEO of Overseas Union Bank which merged with United Overseas Bank in 2001
  - Tang Choon Keng (董俊競/董俊竞; Dong Junjing; Dang Junggeng) (1901–2000; Shantou, Guangdong), founder of Tangs
  - Leow Chia Heng (廖正興/廖正兴; Liao Zhengxing) (1874–1931; Chao'an, Guangdong), Teochew pioneer and philanthropist; co-founder of the Sze Hai Tong Banking & Insurance Company Limited and the Singapore Chinese Chamber of Commerce, having served as the latter's 6th and 9th President in 1911 and 1914 respectively; was a Director of the Singapore Po Leung Kuk and appointed as Justice of the Peace; inaugural President of the Straits Confucian Association (later renamed as Nanyang Confucian Association)
- Malaysia
  - Tan Sri William Cheng (鐘廷森/钟廷森; Zhong Tingsen; Tong Tingsiam) (Chaoyang, Guangdong), chairman of Lion Group and Parkson Retail Group
- United States
  - David Tran (陳德/陈德; Chen De, Trần Họ) (Chaozhou, Guangdong), founder of Huy Fong Foods which is famous for the Sriracha sauce
  - Ted Ngoy (Shantou, Guangdong), owner of Christy's Donuts and known as the "Donut King"
- France
  - Tang Brothers, founder of Tang Frères in France

== Scientists, Researchers ==
Victor Ling discoverer of P-glycoprotein

== Film directors ==
- Mainland China
  - Zheng Zhengqiu (鄭正秋/郑正秋; Dên Zianciu) (1888–1935; Chaoyang, Guangdong), director; his film Nan Fu Nan Qi (難夫難妻/难夫难妻; Nang Hu Nang Ci) was the first feature film in China's history
  - Cai Chusheng (蔡楚生; Cua Cosên) (1906–1968; Chaoyang, Guangdong), director; his film Yu Guang Qu (漁光曲/渔光曲; Heu Guang Kêg) received the first international film prize in China's history
- Hong Kong
  - Ringo Lam (林嶺東/林岭东; Lin Lindong; Lim Lingdang) (1954–; Chaozhou, Guangdong), director
  - Herman Yau (邱禮濤/邱礼涛; Qiu Litao; Yau Loito) (1961–; Chaozhou, Guangdong), director
- Singapore
  - Ken Kwek (1979-; director, his feature film "Unlucky Plaza" (2014) won him the Best Director prize at the Tehran Jasmine Film Festival.
  - Kirsten Tan (1981-; director, her debut feature film "Pop Aye" won the Special Jury prize in Screenwriting in the Sundance Film Festival (2017)

== Literary figures and the arts ==
Mainland China

- Da-Wen Sun (孫大文/孙大文) (1962-Chaozhou, Guangdong), world authority in food engineering education and research
- Xu Dishan (許地山/许地山) (1893–1941; Jieyang, Guangdong), philosopher
- Hong Zicheng (洪子誠/洪子诚; Hong Zeshin) (1939–; Chaozhou, Guangdong), scholar in the field of the history of literature
- Chen Pingyuan (陳平原/陈平原; Tan Pêngnguang) (1954–; Chaozhou, Guangdong), literary professor

Hong Kong

- Tchan Fou-li (simplified Chinese: 陈复礼; traditional Chinese: 陳復禮; pinyin: Chen Fuli; 1916- ), founder of Chinese Photographic Association of Hong Kong and internationally known photographer
- Zhao Tingyang (趙汀陽/赵汀阳; Dio Teng-iang) (1961–; Shantou, Guangdong), Chinese philosophy researcher
- Jao Tsung-I (饒宗頤/饶宗颐; Rao Zongyi; Dziau Zong-i) (1917–; Chaozhou, Guangdong), Chinese scholar, poet, calligrapher and painter

Canada

- Vincent Lam, born in Canada, novelist

United States

- Wena Poon (方慧娜) (1974–), born in Singapore, novelist
- Cheryl Lu-Lien Tan (陳如蓮, 1974–), born in Singapore, novelist and memoirist
- Loung Ung (1970–), born in Cambodia, author and activist

Singapore

- Choo Hoey (朱暉/朱晖, 1934 -) is a Singaporean musician and conductor. His father, Choo Seng, migrated from Chaozhou and his mother from Nanjing. He founded the Singapore Symphony Orchestra and was also its first resident conductor and music director
- Chen Chong Swee (陳宗瑞/陈宗瑞) (b. 1910–85, Swatow, Guangdong), also known as Chen Kai, was a painter, educator, writer and critic. Chen belonged to the pioneering group of artists of the Nanyang Style
- Chua Lam (蔡瀾/蔡澜; Chai Lan; Cua Lam) (1941–; Chaozhou, Guangdong), columnist, food critic, and movie producer

Australia

- Alice Pung (方佳,1981–), author and novelist

== Politicians ==
Cambodia

- Hun Sen, former Prime Minister of Cambodia; the longest-serving head of a Cambodian government

United States

- Tammy Duckworth, American politician, former U.S. Army lieutenant colonel

Australia

- Gladys Liu, Australian politician, formerly a Liberal Party member of the Australian House of Representatives representing the Division of Chisholm in Victoria

Canada

- Alice Wong (黄陳小萍), former Minister of State for Seniors; the first Chinese-Canadian woman sitting in Cabinet

Singapore

- Seah Eu Chin (佘有进), Founder of Ngee Ann Kongsi, was a made a Justice of the Peace and a member of the Grand Jury
- Tan Soo Khoon (陳樹群), former Speaker of the Parliament of Singapore
- Heng Swee Keat (王瑞傑), Deputy Prime Minister and Finance Minister
- Lee Boon Yang (李文獻), former Minister for Information, Communications and the Arts
- Teo Chee Hean (張志賢), Senior Minister, Co-ordinating Minister of National Security
- Low Thia Khiang (劉逞強), former Secretary-General, Workers’ Party, former Member of Parliament, the de facto opposition leader between 2006 and 2018
- Lim Swee Say (林瑞生), Cabinet Minister in Prime Minister's Office
- Lim Boon Heng (林文興), former Cabinet Minister
- Baey Yam Keng (馬炎慶), Member of Parliament, Tampines
- Seng Han Thong (成漢通), former Member of Parliament, Yio Chu Kang
- George Yeo (楊榮文), former Minister for Foreign Affairs (Singapore)
- Teo Ser Luck (張思樂), Senior Parliamentary Secretary for the Ministry of Community Development, Youth and Sports and Ministry of Transport
- Chiam See Tong (詹時中), prominent Opposition Member of Parliament
- Lim Hwee Hua (林陳惠華), first female minister of Singapore

Thailand

- Taksin the Great, Founder and only monarch of Thonburi kingdom
- Pridi Banomyong, 7th Prime Minister of Thailand
- Banharn Silpa-archa (馬德祥), 21st Prime Minister of Thailand
- Samak Sundaravej (李沙馬), 25th Prime Minister of Thailand
- Chamlong Srimuang, former Deputy Prime Minister and Governor of Bangkok

Malaysia

- Tan Kee Soon (陳開順), first Kapitan China of Tebrau, Johor Bahru
- Tan Hiok Nee (陳旭年), Major China of Johor and member for the Council of State of Johor
- Chua Jui Meng (蔡銳明), former Minister of Health
- Chua Soi Lek (蔡細歷), former Minister of Health
- Chua Tee Yong(蔡智勇), Member of Parliament

== Sportspeople ==
Mainland China

- Guo Weiyang (1988–; Shantou, Guangdong; born in Yuxi, Yunnan), gymnast, gold medalist at the 2012 Summer Olympics
- Liao Lisheng (1993–; Jiexi, Guangdong), footballer, Chinese international team player
- Lin Liangming (1997–; Shantou, Guangdong), footballer, Chinese international team player
- Lin Yue (1991–; Chaozhou, Guangdong), diver, gold medalist at the 2008 and 2016 Summer Olympics
- Sun Shuwei (1976–; Jieyang, Guangdong), diver, gold medalist at the 1992 Summer Olympics
- Zhang Yanquan (1994–; Chaozhou, Guangdong), diver, gold medalist at the 2012 Summer Olympics

United States

- Michael Chang (1972–; Chaozhou, Guangdong; born in the United States), former professional tennis player

Canada

- Mervin Tran (1972–); figure skater

Singapore

- Tan Howe Liang (1933–; Shantou, Guangdong), the first Singaporean Olympic individual silver medalist

== Entertainers ==
Mainland China

- He Meitian (何美鈿/何美钿; He Meitian; Ho Muitiang) (1983–; Chaozhou, Guangdong), actress
- Chen Chusheng (陳楚生/陈楚生; Tan Cosên) (1981–; Puning, Guangdong; born in Sanya, Hainan), singer
- Chrissie Chau (周秀娜) (1985–; Chaozhou, Guangdong), actress and model
- Tizzy T (謝銳韜/谢锐韬; 1993–; Chaoshan, Guangdong), rapper
- Danko (弹壳) (刘嘉裕/劉嘉裕; 1992–; Shantou, Guangdong), rapper

Hong Kong

- Canti Lau (劉錫明/劉锡明; Liu Ximing; Liu Siahmêng) (1964–; Chaoyang, Guangdong; born in Hong Kong), actor and singer
- Damian Lau (劉松仁/刘松仁; Liu Songren; Lau Cungjan) (1949–; Chaozhou, Guangdong; born in Hong Kong), film and television actor, executive producer and film director
- Sammul Chan (陳鍵鋒/陈键锋; Chén Jiànfēng; Chan Gin-fung) (1978–; Chaozhou, Guangdong; born in Hong Kong), actor, singer
- Emil Chau (周華健/周华健; Zhou Huajian; Chiu Hua-giang) (1960–; Chaoyang, Guangdong; born in Hong Kong), actor and singer
- Matthew Ko (高鈞賢/高钧贤; Gao Junxian; Gao Jao-ghao) (1984–; Chaozhou, Guangdong; born in Hong Kong), model
- Kwong Wa (江華/江华; Jiang Hua; Gang Hua) (1962–; Shantou, Guangdong; born in Hong Kong), actor and singer
- Miriam Yeung (楊千嬅/杨千桦; Yang Qianhua; Yêng Cainhua) (1974–; Jieyang, Guangdong; born in Hong Kong), actress and singer
- Sammi Cheng (鄭秀文/郑秀文; Zheng Xiuwen; Dên Siu-mung) (1972–; Chenghai, Guangdong; born in Hong Kong), actress and singer
- Ada Choi (蔡少芬/蔡少芬; Cai Shaofen; Choi Siufun) (1973–; Chaoshan, Guangdong; born in Hong Kong), actress
- Steven Ma (馬浚偉/马浚伟; Ma FengWei; Maa Zeonwai) (1971–; Chaozhou, Guangdong; born in Hong Kong), actor and singer
- Stephen Wong Cheung-Hing (黃長興/黄长兴) (1978–; Shantou, Guangdong; born in Hong Kong), actor
- Karena Lam (林嘉欣) (1978–; Chaozhou, Guangdong; born in Canada), actress and singer
- Eric Suen Yiu Wai (孫耀威/孙耀威) (1973–; Chaozhou, Guangdong; born in Hong Kong), actor, singer and TV host
- Joe Ma (馬德鐘/马德钟) (1968–;Chaozhou, Guangdong; born in Hong Kong), actor
- Kent Tong (湯鎮業/汤镇业) (1958–; Chaozhou, Guangdong; born in Hong Kong), actor, screenwriter and film producer
- Kent Cheng (鄭則仕/郑则仕) (1951–; Shantou, Guangdong; born in Hong Kong), TV and film actor
- Bosco Wong (黃宗澤/黃宗泽) (1980–; Chaozhou, Guangdong; born in Hong Kong), actor
- Lucas Wong (黃旭熙) (1999–; born in Hong Kong), rapper, singer, and model

Singapore

- Zoe Tay (鄭惠玉/郑惠玉; Zhèng Huìyù; Jeng Wai Yuk) (1968–; Chaozhou, Guangdong; born in Singapore), actress
- Chen Shucheng (陳澍承/陈澍承) (1949–;Chaoshan, Chaozhou; born in Singapore, actor
- Chen Liping (陳莉萍/陈莉萍) (1965–;Chaozhou, Guangdong; born in Singapore, actress
- Huang Wenyong (黄文永), actor
- Li Nanxing (李南星) (1964-; Chaozhou, Guangdong; born in Malaysia), actor
- Celest Chong(張玉華/张玉华) (1973–; Chaozhou, Guangdong; born in Singapore), singer and actress
- Stefanie Sun (孫燕姿/孙燕姿; Sun Yanzi; Sung Ince) (1978–; Chaozhou, Guangdong; born in Singapore), singer
- Kym Ng (鍾琴/钟琴) (1967-; Chaozhou, Guangdong; born in Singapore), actress and TV host
- Dennis Chew (周崇慶/周崇庆) (1973-; Chaozhou, Guangdong; born in Singapore), radio deejay, variety show host, actor and singer
- Chew Chor Meng (周初明) (1968-; Chaozhou, Guangdong; born in Singapore), actor
- Pornsak Prajakwit (1984-; Chaozhou, Guangdong; born in Thailand), variety show host
- Christopher Lee Meng Soon (李銘順/李铭顺) (1971-; Chaozhou, Guangdong; born in Malaysia), actor, host, singer
- Xiang Yun (向雲/向云) (1961-; Chaozhou, Guangdong; born in Singapore), actress and TV host
- Chen Hanwei (陳漢瑋/陈汉玮) (1969-; Chaozhou, Guangdong; born in Malaysia), actor and singer
- Tan Kheng Hua (陈琼华) (1963-; Chaozhou, born in Singapore), actress

South Korea

- Jang Yong (Korean: 張龍/장용; 張龍/张龙; Zhang Long; Dion Leng) (1945–; Chaozhou, Guangdong; born in South Korea), actor

United Kingdom

- Jessica Henwick (1992–; born in Surrey), actress

United States

- Amber Liu (singer) (1992–; born in Los Angeles), singer, rapper and songwriter

Canada

- Henry Lau (1989–; born in Toronto), singer, songwriter, composer, dancer, actor, musician, model and entertainer

== Others ==
- Somdet Phrachao Taksin Maharaj (Thai: สมเด็จพระเจ้าตากสินมหาราช) or Somdet Phrachao Krung Thonburi (Thai: สมเด็จพระเจ้ากรุงธนบุรี; Chinese: 鄭昭; pinyin: Zhèng Zhāo; Teochew: Dênchao) (1734–1782; Chenghai, Shantou; born in Thailand), King Taksin the Great of Thonburi Kingdom, Thailand
- Chow Yam-nam (周欽南) (1937-2013), famous spiritual guru born in Pattaya of Thailand, better known publicly as Bai Long Wang (白龍王), literally the "White Dragon King".
- Limahong (林鳳/林凤; Lin Feng; Lim Hong) (15??–15??; Raoping, Chaozhou, Guangdong), pirate, tried and failed to capture Manila from the Spanish Philippines
- Lê Văn Viễn (aka Bảy Viễn; Vien the seventh) (1904–1972; Chaozhou, Guangdong; born in Vietnam), leader of a powerful Vietnamese criminal organisation—Bình Xuyên Organisation
- Haing S. Ngor (1940–96; born in Samrong Yong, Cambodia), award-winning actor of Khmer and partial Chinese Teochew descent

== See also ==
- List of Hokkien people
- List of Cantonese people
