= Chali Sophonpanich =

Thai businessman

Chali Sophonpanich, (Chinese: 陳智淦) is a Thai businessman and the second son of Chatri Sophonpanich, grandson of Chin Sophonpanich. He serves as the president of Asia Investment; his family owns Bangkok Bank. He is also the owner of City Reality Co., and is the founder of the Shrewsbury International School Bangkok.
