= Stephen Tan =

Stephen Tan (born in 1961), (Chinese: 陳智文) is a Hong Kong businessman. He is the first son of Robin Chan (chairman of the Asia Financial Group), and a grandson of Chin Sophonpanich (founder and former president of Bangkok Bank). He serves as the executive director of the Asia Financial Group. He has a brother Bernard Chan, who is a Hong Kong politician and businessman, president of Asia Financial Group and its main subsidiary, Asia Insurance.

== Personal ==
Tan has a Bachelor’s degree in Business Administration from St. John's University and Master’s from Rutgers University.
