= Teochew people =

Ethnic group of southern China

潮州人 / 潮汕人

Total population
- 25,000,000

Regions with significant populations
- China and Southeast Asia

Languages
- Teochew (mother tongue); Standard Chinese (lingua franca); other residential languages: Thai; Vietnamese; Cantonese; English

Religion
- Chinese folk religion and others

Related ethnic groups
- Hokkien people and Putian people

Teochew people
- Chinese: 潮州人
Transcriptions
Standard Mandarin
- Hanyu Pinyin: Cháozhōurén
Yue: Cantonese
- Jyutping: ciu4 zau1 jan4
Southern Min
- Hokkien POJ: Tiô-chiu-lâng
- Teochew Peng'im: diê5 ziu1 nang5 / dio5 ziu1 nang5

The Teochew (/tiˈoʊt͡ʃuː/), Teo-Swa, or Chaoshanese are a Han Chinese sub-ethnic group native to the Chaoshan region in south China who speak the Teochew language, a variety of Southern Min. Today, ethnic Teochew people live throughout Chaoshan and Hong Kong, but most live outside China in Southeast Asia, including in Singapore, Malaysia, Thailand, Indonesia, Cambodia, Vietnam, and the Philippines. The community can also be found in diasporas around the world, including the United States, Canada, Australia, New Zealand, and France.

== Names ==
The ancestral homeland of the Teochew people is now known in China as Teo-Swa or Chaoshan (Chinese: 潮汕; Peng'im: Diê^{5}suan^{1}; pinyin: Cháoshàn). This whole region was historically known as Teochew (Chinese: 潮州; Peng'im: Diê^{5}ziu^{1}; pinyin: Cháozhōu), and this term continues to be used by the Teochew diaspora in Southeast Asia.

In referring to themselves as Sinitic people, Teochew people generally use Deng^{5}nang^{5} (Chinese: 唐人/唐儂; lit. 'Tang dynasty people'), as opposed to Hang^{3}ring^{5} (Chinese: 漢人; lit. 'Han dynasty people').

Teochew people also commonly refer to each other as ga^{1}gi^{7}nang^{5} (Chinese: 家己人/家自人/家己儂; lit. 'our own people').

== History ==
The ancestors of the Teochew people moved to present-day Chaoshan as refugees from central and northern China due to various reasons. Historical texts suggest this was likely due to war and famine in the region. The Teochews, along with the Hokkien people, migrated from the Central Plains and Yellow River region, mainly from the Henan, Shaanxi and Shandong provinces. This is evident in several genetic studies, which show a strong relationship and ancestry based on common Y-chromosome patterns and higher prevalence of esophageal cancer. Han Chinese from the Taihang region of Henan are likely the ancestral population for both Fujian Han (i.e. Hokkien people) and the Chaoshan Han (i.e. the Teochew people).

The Teochew language was officially established sometime around the Tang and Song periods, before becoming a mature and well-established language sometime during late Ming / early Qing period. From approximately 900 AD – 1600 AD, as a result of various wars and political instability in the north, there was a large influx of Han Chinese from the north and central provinces to the Chaoshan region. This demographic shift is reflected in genetic studies, which show that the Teochew retain a high proportion of Central and Northern ancestry like the Hakka. Genetically, they cluster on the same stratum as central Chinese provinces, such as Hunan and Hubei.

The Teochew were often called Fulao (Hoklo) because they came mostly passed through Fujian during migration, with some well-maintained language and customs from ancient China. As was recorded in pedigrees and ancient inscriptions, one of the two groups of those who originally migrated to the capital city of Fujian later moved to Putian staying for at most one or two generations before being pressured to move to parts of Chaoshan instead in batches during the Tang dynasty, genetically intermixing with the local people there.

The Teochew people are mistakenly referred to by the Cantonese as "Hoklo", literally meaning "men of Fujian", although the term "Teochew" was used in the Straits Settlements in the 19th century and early 20th century. "Teochew" is derived from Teochew prefecture (Chaozhou Fu), the departmental city where they originate.

=== Teochew immigration to Singapore ===
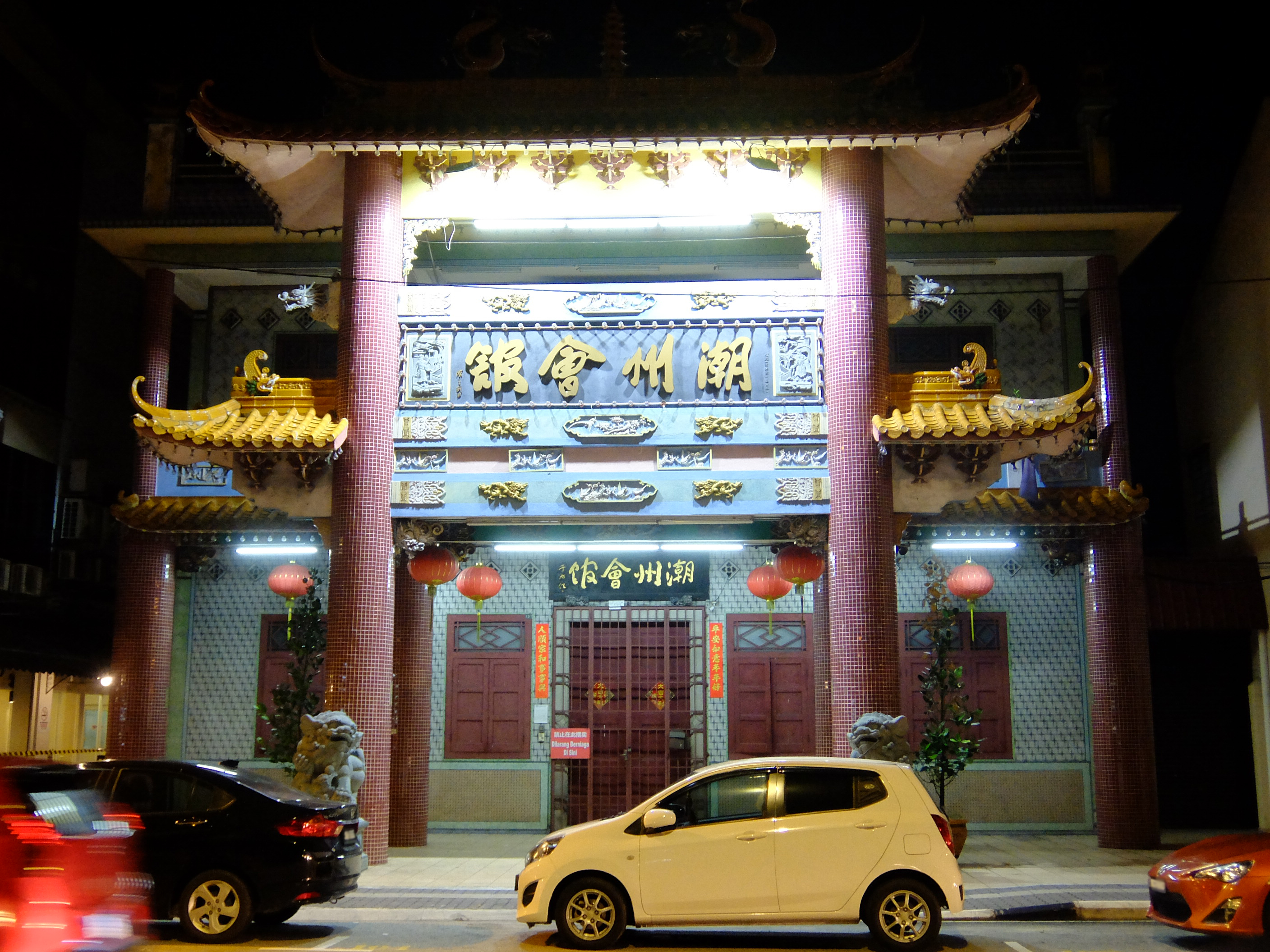
Teochew Association in Muar, Johor, Malaysia.

The writings of Stamford Raffles and William Farquhar indicate that the British found Temenggong Abdul Rahman with 400 to 500 residents in Singapore in January 1819. Another member of the 1819 expedition party, Captain John Crawford, recalled in his diary an encounter with "upwards of 100" of Chinese. British colonial documentations revealed that Temenggong Abdul Rahman had provided these Chinese who were Teochews the cost and expenses of opening gambier plantations at Mount Stamford (now Pearl's Hill) prior to British arrival. He had also "in some instances" advanced money to the Teochew cultivators on the understanding he would be repaid in the form of gambier or other produce. Farquhar had the impressions that the Temenggong's interests in these plantations were represented by a brother-in-law of his named Baba Ketchil and the first Captain China of Singapore, a Teochew merchant named Tan Heng Kim (陈亨钦), was "one of the principal persons concerned". Based on Teochew oral traditions in Singapore published by Phua Chye Long (潘醒农) in Teo-chews in Malaya (马来亚潮侨通鉴) in 1950, the first Teochews in Singapore were led by Tan Heng Kim, who was from Siam, and a second merchant named Heng Hong Sung (王丰顺) from Ampou town in Chaozhou, China. Together, they founded the Yueh Hai Ching Temple on the south bank of the Singapore River.

From the 19th century, significant numbers of Teochew people left their homeland for Singapore and a new life. Early Teochew settlers could trace their origins to eight counties/prefectures (潮州八邑): Chao'an, Chenghai, Chaoyang, Jieyang, Raoping, Puning, Huilai and Nan'ao. In addition to these new immigrants from the port of Swatow (Shantou), Teochew immigrants from Siam and the Riau Islands also began settling in Singapore after 1819.

Today, Teochew language is the second-most spoken Sinitic language in Singapore. Teochews are the second-largest Chinese dialect group in Singapore, accounting for approximately 19.4% of the Chinese population according to the 2020 Population Census.

=== Teochew immigration to Thailand ===
Teochew Chinese form the largest Chinese subgroup in Thailand, accounting for more than half of the Thai‑Chinese population. Originating from southern China, particularly the Teochew region of Guangdong, they migrated to Thailand over several centuries. Major waves occurred during the Ayutthaya period and again in the 19th and early 20th centuries, driven by poverty, famine, and conflict in their homeland. Upon arrival, Teochew migrants settled mainly in coastal and riverine market towns, where they became early pioneers in trade and agriculture. Many specialized in fishing, rice farming, and salt production, gradually establishing themselves as influential merchant communities, especially in Bangkok.

Their cultural impact on Thailand has been profound. Teochew culinary traditions helped shape Thai cuisine, especially street food, while Teochew words entered everyday Thai vocabulary. For example, the Thai word for soy sauce, sii‑íu (ซีอิ๊ว), is directly derived from Teochew. Its pronunciation closely matches si⁷ iu⁵ (豉油) in the Teochew dialect. Over generations, the community has largely assimilated into Thai society, yet many families continue to maintain aspects of their heritage. The Teochew dialect remains widely used in business networks and community life. Today, the Teochew‑Thai population stands as a cornerstone of Thailand’s social and economic landscape, contributing significantly to commerce, culture, and the country’s modern identity.

=== Teochew in Taiwan ===
Most of the Teochew descendants in Taiwan have already been "hokkienized" ("hoklonized"). They speak the Taiwanese Hokkien language instead of Teochew, but some Teochew are still in Chaozhou township, in Pingtung County.

A 1926 Japanese census found that 134,800 people in Taiwan were of Teochew ancestry.

== Diaspora ==
While the Chinese diaspora as a whole is known for its relative economic success and dominant position in Southeast Asia, with successful businesspeople and tycoons found across all dialect groups, the Teochew, in particular, have acquired a distinct reputation for their commercial acumen and often have the highest socioeconomic status among Chinese diaspora communities, especially in Thailand.

== Culture ==
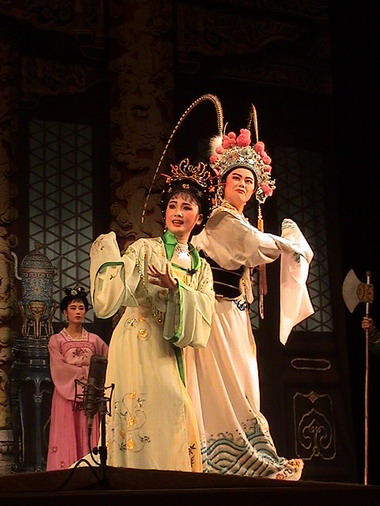
Chaozhou opera

Throughout a history of over 1000 years, the region of Chaoshan, known in ancient times as Teochew Prefecture, has developed and cultivated a prestigious culture, which manifests its unique characteristics in language, opera, traditional dress, cuisine, tea practice, music, and embroidery.

The Teochew language (simplified Chinese: 潮州话; traditional Chinese: 潮州話; Teochew pronunciation: Diê5 ziu1 uê7) is a series of dialect varieties spoken across the geographical area which was formerly administered by Teochew Prefecture (潮州府) from the Hongwu period of the Ming dynasty (1369) to the end of the Qing dynasty. It is spoken by roughly 10 million people in Chaoshan and more than five million outside mainland China.

Teochew cuisine is known for its unique cooking methods, distinctive sauces, seafood dishes, and stews.

Teochew opera (潮劇) is a traditional art form with a history of more than 400 years and is now enjoyed by 20 million Teochew people in over 40 countries and regions. Based on local folk dances and ballads, Teochew opera has formed its own style under the influence of Nanxi Opera. Nanxi is one of the oldest Chinese operas and originated in the Song dynasty. The old form of choral accompaniment still preserves its distinctive features. Teochew Clowns (潮丑) and females are the most distinctive characters in Teochew opera, and fan play and acrobatic skills are prominent.

Teochew music (潮州音樂) is popular in Chaoshan's teahouse scene. The Teochew string instrument, gong, drum, and traditional Chinese flute are typically involved in ensembles. The current Chaozhou drum music is said to be similar to the Drum and Wind Music form of the Han and Tang dynasties.

Teochew woodcarving (潮州木雕) is a form of Chinese woodcarving originating from Chaoshan. Featuring exquisite, sophisticated, precise and lifelike carvings, Teochew woodcarving is one of the oldest and lively woodcarving art in China. Teochew people used a great deal of Teochew wood carving in their buildings, especially the Teochew gold-leaf gilded carving (金漆木雕).

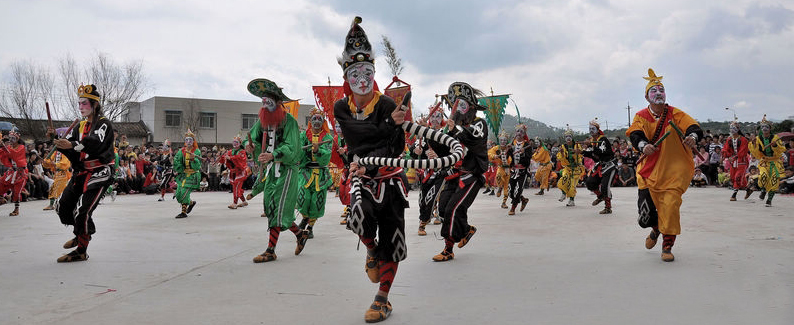
Yingge dance

Yingge dance (英歌) is a form of Chinese folk dance which started in the Qing dynasty. With a history of more than 300 years, it is regarded as one of the most representative forms of folk arts in Teochew culture.

Although few movies or television dramas have been made about the Teochew people, one such notable drama is the Singaporean 1995 drama series The Teochew Family. In 2019, Netflix released the documentary series Flavorful Origins, which focused on Teochew cuisine. Another example is Dear You, a 2026 drama film, which put a spotlight on Chinese dialects beyond Teochew, and led the Parliament of Singapore to initiate reforms with promoting dialects. Singaporean-Malaysian singing competition The Voice added a mandatory requirement beginning from the second season in 2022 for contestants (or artists) to sing at least one song in dialect; this also extends to the live shows, with one week dedicating contestants to perform dialect songs. Channel 8 also had a few shows every Friday during the daytime slot to also focus onto dialects.

Besides culture, the Teochew diaspora has also played a key role in politics. One notable case was when Hougang, a historically Teochew neighborhood in Singapore, was represented by Workers' Party MP Low Thia Khiang, who frequently gave campaign rally speeches in Teochew, since his first election win in the now-safe seat in 1991.

== Notable Teochew people ==
=== Royalty ===
- King Taksin of the Thonburi Kingdom

=== Politicians ===
==== Leaders ====
- Pridi Banomyong, 7th Prime Minister of Thailand; 1946
- Thawan Thamrongnawasawat, 8th Prime Minister of Thailand; 1946–1947
- Thanin Kraivichien, 14th Prime Minister of Thailand; 1976–1977
- Kriangsak Chamanan, 15th Prime Minister of Thailand; 1977–1980
- Chatichai Choonhavan, 17th Prime Minister of Thailand; 1988–1991.
- Suchinda Kraprayoon, 19th Prime Minister of Thailand; 1992
- Banharn Silpa-archa, 21st Prime Minister of Thailand; 1995–1996
- Chavalit Yongchaiyudh, 22nd Prime Minister of Thailand; 1996–1997

==== Cabinet ministry and other backbenchers ====
- Bhichai Rattakul, President of the National Assembly, Speaker of the House of Representatives, Deputy Prime Minister of Thailand.
- Chumpol Silpa-archa, Deputy Prime Minister of Thailand, Minister of Tourism and Sports, Minister of Education.
- Kalaya Sophonpanich, Minister of Science and Technology of Thailand.
- Korn Dabbaransi, Deputy Prime Minister of Thailand, Minister of Office of the Prime Minister, Minister of Science and Technology, Minister of Public Health, Minister of Industry.
- Bhichit Rattakul, Governor of Bangkok.
- Alice Wong, Minister of Business, Minister of Seniors of Canada.
- Lim Boon Heng, former Minister in the Prime Minister's Office, Minister without portfolio.
- Lim Swee Say, former Minister in the Prime Minister's Office, Minister for Manpower, Minister for the Environment of Singapore.
- Low Thia Khiang, former Singapore Member-of-Parliament and Workers' Party secretary-general.
- Teo Chee Hean, Senior Minister of Singapore, Coordinating Minister for National Security.
- Tan Soo Khoon, former Speaker of the Parliament of Singapore.
- Varawut Silpa-archa, Minister of Natural Resources and Environment of Thailand.
- Koh Poh Koon, former Senior Minister for Environment, Manpower, Trade and Industry of Singapore.
- Desmond Choo, Minister of State for Defence.

==== Others ====
- Kraisak Choonhavan, member of Thailand parliament.
- Gladys Liu, Member of Parliament for Chisholm, Australia.

=== Businesspeople and entrepreneurs ===
- Li Ka-shing, founder of Cheung Kong Holdings.
- Pung Kheav Se, founder of Canadia Group.
- Chau Chak-Wing, founder of Kingold Group.
- Chin Sophonpanich, founded Bangkok Bank and Bangkok Insurance.
- Vincent Lo, founder and chairman of Shui On Group.
- Lim Por-yen, founded the Lai Sun Group.
- Goh Cheng Liang, billionaire businessman, founded Wuthelam Holdings, which manufactures paint and coatings.
- Charoen Sirivadhanabhakdi, billionaire, founder of Thai Beverage, and the chairman of conglomerates TCC Group and Fraser and Neave.
- Krit Ratanarak, chairman of Bangkok Broadcasting & Television Company.
- Joseph Lau, founder, chairman, and CEO of Chinese Estates Group.
- Thomas Lau, CEO of Lifestyle International Holdings which operates Hong Kong's largest department, Sogo Hong Kong.
- Trương Mỹ Lan, billionaire businesswoman and real estate developer in Vietnam, convicted for corruption in 2024.
- Peter Lam, billionaire and chairman of the Hong Kong Trade Development Council.
- Chartsiri Sophonpanich, president of Bangkok Bank.
- Ma Huateng, one of the top ten richest men in the world, with an estimated net worth of US$55.3 billion. He is the founder, chairman, and CEO of Tencent.
- Thapana Sirivadhanabhakdi, CEO and president of ThaiBev.
- Ted Ngoy, the donut king who once dominated SoCal's Cambodian donut market.
- David Tran, the founder of Sriracha

=== Actors and singers ===
- Chen Shucheng, actor and host.
- Tan Kheng Hua, actress
- Canti Lau, actor and singer.
- Zoe Tay, actress and former model.
- Chen Hanwei, actor.
- Joe Ma, actor.
- Ada Choi, actress.
- James Ma, actor and model from Thailand.
- Lucas Wong, rapper, singer, and model.
- Jessica Henwick, actress, director and writer.
- Ellen Wong, actress.
- Aunty Ru, singer.
- Anna Hiscox (Quach), cookbook author and dog trainer.
- David Sun, French comedian

== See also ==
- Poh Teck Tung Foundation: Teochew religious charitable group in Thailand
- Ngee Ann Kongsi: Teochew charitable group in Singapore
- Thai Chinese
- Taishanese people
- Lingnan culture
- Chaoshan culture
- Lingnan

== References and further reading ==
- Gia Lim Tan, "Origins," An Introduction to the Culture and History of the Teochews in Singapore," ISBN 9813239352 World Scientific, 2018. doi:10.1142/10967
