= Bernard Charnwut Chan =

Hong Kongese politician

The Honourable Bernard Charnwut Chan Charnwut Sophonpanich GBM, GBS, JP
- 陳智思
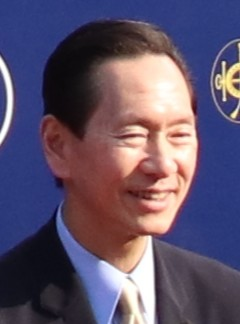
- Chan in 2025

Non-official Convenor of the Executive Council
- In office 1 July 2017 – 30 June 2022
- Appointed by: Carrie Lam
- Preceded by: Lam Woon-kwong
- Succeeded by: Regina Ip

Non-official Member of the Executive Council
- In office 1 July 2012 – 30 June 2022
- Appointed by: Leung Chun-ying; Carrie Lam
- In office 26 October 2004 – 20 January 2009
- Appointed by: Tung Chee-hwa; Donald Tsang

Chairman of the Council of Lingnan University
- In office 22 October 2010 – 21 October 2014
- Deputy: Sophia Kao

Delegate to the National People's Congress
- In office March 2008 – 2023
- Chairman: Wu Bangguo; Zhang Dejiang; Li Zhanshu
- Constituency: Hong Kong

Member of the Legislative Council
- In office 1 July 1998 – 30 September 2008
- Succeeded by: Chan Kin-por
- Constituency: Insurance

Personal details
- Born: 11 January 1965 (age 61) British Hong Kong
- Spouse: Yeo Peck Leng
- Relations: Chin Sophonpanich (grandfather); Robin Chan (father); Chatri Sophonpanich (uncle); Chartsiri Sophonpanich (cousin); Ken Sim (cousin)
- Children: 2
- Education: Pomona College (BA)

Bernard Charnwut Chan (Note: In this Chinese name, the family name is Chan (陳).) GBM GBS JP (Chinese: 陳智思; Jyutping: Can4 Zi3 Si1; 11 January 1965), is a Hong Kong businessman and former politician. He served as a Hong Kong Deputy to the National People's Congress from 2008 to 2023, and as Convenor of the Non-Official Members of the Executive Council of HKSAR from 2017 to 2022. He was a non-official member of Hong Kong's Executive Council (2004–09 and 2012–2022), and a member of the Legislative Council (1998–2008), representing the insurance functional constituency.

== Background ==
Chan was born in Hong Kong with family roots in Chaoyang, Canton, also known by his Thai name Charnwut Sophonpanich (Thai: ชาญวุฒิ โสภณพนิช; RTGS: Chanwut Sophonphanit). He is the grandson of Chin Sophonpanich, the late Thai Chinese founder of Bangkok Bank. He graduated from The Hill School in 1983 and Pomona College in 1988 with a BA in Studio Art. He is an investor in Thailand's Bumrungrad International Hospital.

Chan was Convenor of the Non-Official Members of the Executive Council of Hong Kong SAR from 2017 to 2022. He was a member of the Legislative Council (Legco) from 1998 to 2008, representing the Insurance constituency. He became a Hong Kong Deputy to National People's Congress of the People's Republic of China in 2008. He chairs several government advisory bodies: the Advisory Committee on Revitalizing Historical Buildings, the Standing Committee on Judicial Salaries and Condition of Services and the Hong Kong Council for Sustainable Development. He chaired the Antiquities Advisory Board from 2009–2013 and the Standing Committee on Disciplined Services Salaries and Condition of Services from 2001–2006.

In September 2023, he succeeded Tung Chee-hwa as chairman of Our Hong Kong Foundation, a prominent local think tank.

Outside of politics, he is President of Asia Financial Holdings and its main subsidiary, Asia Insurance.

Among his business successes are the formation in 1999 of Bank Consortium Trust, a joint venture of nine Hong Kong institutions that provides Mandatory Provident Fund services and of which he was founding chairman. He is also Chairman of The Hong Kong Council of Social Service, chair of the Hong Kong-Thailand Business Council, chairman of the council of Lingnan University and vice-chairman of Oxfam Hong Kong; he is also chairman of the annual HK Oxfam Trailwalker event – a fund-raising 100-kilometre race that attracts teams from around the world. He played a part in the creation of Caring Company, a framework that creates partnerships between the business and welfare sectors. Chan has been awarded Commander (third class) of the Most Noble Order of the Crown of Thailand, the Grand Bauhinia Medal (GBM), the Gold Bauhinia Star (GBS) and Justice of the Peace (JP).

He held American and Thai citizenship until 2004, when he was appointed member of the executive council and was required to relinquish all other nationalities.

In April 2021, he wrote an opinion piece, claiming that the NPCSC's decision to reform elections and only allow "patriots" to serve in the government was good and that "Taxpayers should welcome the revamp."

In December 2021, it was reported that Chan was eligible to vote four times in the 2021 Hong Kong legislative election, yielding 0.0411561% of the total voting value (elected seats), which is 8280 times more than the value of an average voter's total voting value.

In October 2022, Chan admitted that Singapore's government was the "winner" over Hong Kong's, in COVID-19 pandemic measures. Chan also said that Hong Kong's talent acquisition was hurt by its COVID-19 measures, and that the city was "too confident" in the past.

In November 2022, after the government sent a delegation to Thailand, Chan said "It sent a message to both locals and the outside world that Hong Kong is returning to normalcy."

Chan has held leadership roles in Hong Kong's cultural sector. He has served on the Board of the West Kowloon Cultural District Authority (WKCDA) since 2016, and became its Vice-Chairman on 23 October 2022. On 1 October 2025, he succeeded Henry Tang as Chairman of the WKCDA Board for a two-year term.

He was the founding Chairman of the Hong Kong Palace Museum from March 2018 to August 2022, and became Chairman of the M+ Board in April 2022.

He is also Chairman of Tai Kwun Culture & Arts Company Limited, established in April 2020 as a subsidiary of The Jockey Club CPS Limited to manage Tai Kwun's programming, including both contemporary art and performing arts.

== Family ==
He is married to Singaporean Yeo Peck Leng and has two children.

In 2011, Chan's wife, Yeo Peck Leng, founded an "alternative" private primary school, the Almitas Academy, with the couple's two sons as the only pupils. A year later the strongly Christian school, which operates in a commercial building in North Point, had 12 pupils aged from six to 12, about a third of whom have special needs. The academy works closely with parents to nurture their children to their fullest potential. Effective 1 January 2013, the academy changed its status to a not for profit organisation and also took the opportunity to change the English name of the school to Grace Christian Academy.

According to his 2021 Declaration of Registrable Interests, he owns one residential property in Wan Chai, one in San Francisco, one in Bangkok, 3 in Sai Kung, and 2 parking lots in Sai Kung.

He is also a member of the American Club, Hong Kong Club, Hong Kong Country Club, and others.

== Notes ==
Legislative Council of Hong Kong
New parliament	Member of Legislative Council; Representative for Insurance; 1998–2008	Succeeded by Chan Kin-por
Political offices
Preceded by Lam Woon-kwong	Convenor of the Executive Council; 2017–2022	Succeeded by Regina Ip
Preceded by Albert Hung; Recipients of the Grand Bauhinia Medal	Hong Kong order of precedence Recipients of the Grand Bauhinia Medal	Succeeded by Chan Tung; Recipients of the Grand Bauhinia Medal
