= Peking University Chinese Department =

Institution of Chinese language and literature

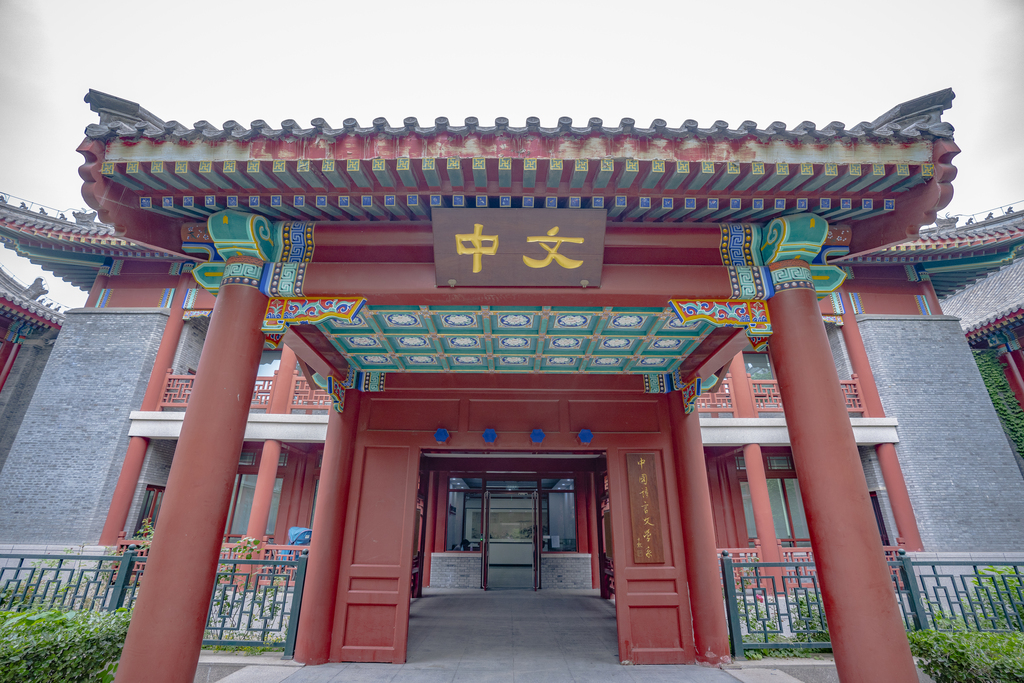
Department of Chinese Language and Literature, Peking University

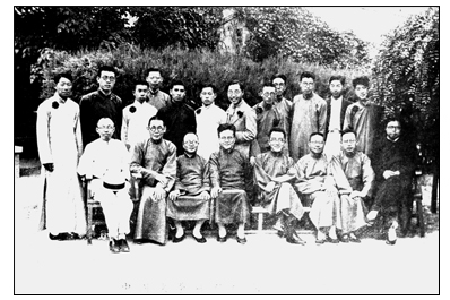
Department of Chinese Language and Literature, Peking University, 1937

Peking University Chinese Department, full name Department of Chinese Language and Literature, Peking University (simplified Chinese: 北京大学中国语言文学系; traditional Chinese: 北京大學中國語言文學系; pinyin: Běijīng Dàxué Zhōngguó Yǔyán Wénxué Xì), is a top institution of Chinese language and literature in China. Founded in 1910, it is one of the oldest department of Peking University.

== History ==
In 1910, the “Wenxue Men” (Discipline of Literature) at the Imperial University of Peking was officially established. It was the first independent teaching institution on literature among Chinese universities.

In 1919, the Discipline of Literature was renamed the "Department of Chinese Literature".

In 1937, after the outbreak of the Anti-Japanese War, the department moved south with the university and merged into the National Southwest Associated University. Following the victory of the war, it returned to Peking in 1946 and resumed its existence.

Following the restructuring of schools and departments in 1952, the department was renamed the "Department of Chinese Language and Literature". In 1954, the Department of Linguistics of Sun Yat-sen University was merged into Peking University.

In 1978, The Chinese Department enrolled the first batch of undergraduate and graduate students after the Cultural Revolution. The teachers finally regained the freedom to engage in academic research.

In 2007, the Chinese Language and Literature discipline as a whole was designated as one of the first national first-level key disciplines.

== Current situation ==
Currently, the department offers four undergraduate programs: Chinese Literature, Chinese Linguistics, Studies of Ancient Chinese Documents, and Applied Linguistics (Chinese Information Processing). The department also offers an undergraduate program in Chinese Literature for international students. And there is a post-doctoral research station of the first-class National Key Specialty of Chinese Language and Literature. From 2016 to 2022, the department published over 300 monographs and textbooks, and over 2,300 papers in major domestic and international academic journals.

== Ranking ==
The department's subjects of Chinese Language and Literature as well as Linguistics are double first-class disciplines by the Ministry of Education of PRC China. Its linguistics ranked the 2nd in QS World University Rankings 2025 by Subject. In the QS 2024, the department's "Classics and Ancient History" ranked 10th in the world, "Modern Linguistics" ranked 9th in the world, and "Linguistics" ranked 21st in the world.

== Notable Figures ==
- Lu Xun
- Zhou Zuoren
- Hu Shi
- Wang Li (linguist)
- Lin Zhao
- Chen Xitong
- Chen Pingyuan

== See also ==
- Peking University
- Shen Yang incident
