= Robin Chan =

Robin Chan may refer to:

- Robin Chan (businessman) (born 1932), chairman of the Asia Financial Group
- Robin Chan (footballer) (born 1968), retired Malaysian-American soccer player
