= Bumrungrad International Hospital =

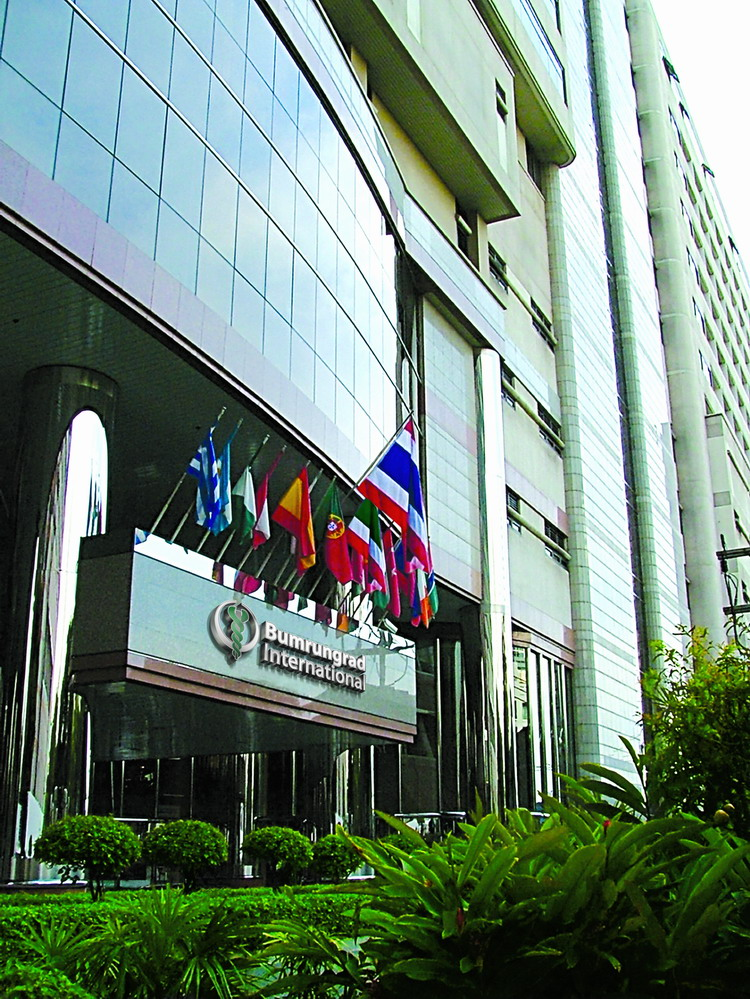
- Bumrungrad International Hospital

Geography
- Location: Bangkok, Thailand
- Coordinates: 13.7463°N 100.5526°E

Organisation
- Care system: Private
- Type: General and Specialized
- Affiliated university: None

Services
- Standards: Accredited by the Joint Commission, et al.
- Beds: 580 Inpatient, 63 ICU (2019)

History
- Opened: 17 September 1980; 45 years ago

Links
- Website: www.bumrungrad.com
- Lists: Hospitals in Thailand

Bumrungrad International Hospital (Thai: โรงพยาบาลบำรุงราษฎร์, RTGS: Rongphayaban Bamrung Rat, pronounced [rōːŋ.pʰā.jāː.bāːn bām.rūŋ râːt]; SET: BH) is a private hospital founded in 1980 in Bangkok, Thailand. More frequently referred to as Bumrungrad Hospital or simply Bumrungrad, its name, Bumrungrad means 'to care for the populace' or 'to nurture the people'.

== History ==
Bumrungrad International Hospital was established as a 200-bed facility on 17 September 1980 with an investment of 90 million baht. Bumrungrad is Southeast Asia's largest private hospital. As a regional referral centre for specialty medicine, it is one of the world's popular medical tourism destinations. The majority shareholders in the hospital are Thai NVDR Co., Ltd.; Bangkok Insurance Public Company Limited; Bangkok Bank Public Company Limited; and the Sophonpanich family.

== Management and organisation ==
The hospital employs more than 4,800 persons including 1,200 physicians and dentists and 900 nurses.

As of 2019 the chairman of the board is Mr. Chai Sophonpanich. The managing director is Mrs Linda Lisahapanya.

As of 2011, Bumrungrad International was managed by administrators from the United States, Australia, Thailand, and the United Kingdom. The 2006 hospital's medical chairman was board certified in the UK, and its group medical director was board certified in the US. The company's Board of Directors as of 31 January 2019 CEO is Artirat Charukitpipat, Hospital chief executive officer (CEO). Other top medical officers were trained in the UK or US, or held positions at one of Thailand's top teaching hospitals. As of 2006, a large proportion of the medical staff had international experience, and were board certified in Australia, Germany, Japan, the UK or the US (210 were board-certified in the US).

== Financials ==
Bumrungrad is owned by the Bumrungrad Hospital Public Company Limited. It was listed on the Stock Exchange of Thailand (SET) on 15 December 1989, trading under the symbol "BH".

For its fiscal year 2018 ending 31 December 2018, the company reported revenues of 18,541 million baht, assets of 24,749 million baht, and a net profit of 4,152 million baht, all numbers up from the previous year.

== Accreditations and recognition ==
Bumrungrad was the first hospital in Asia to be accredited by the Joint Commission International (JCI), an affiliate of the Joint Commission, a leader in healthcare accreditation. The accreditation examination inspects every aspect of hospital procedure from surgical hygiene and anesthesia procedures to the credentials of medical staff and health policy issues. First accredited in 2002 by JCI, Bumrungrad has been re-accredited five consecutive times since. The hospital has received accreditation or awards from numerous other agencies.

== Services ==
Bumrungrad is in the heart of Bangkok, Thailand and as of 2007 has been called a "one-stop" centre for medical services, especially for surgical procedures.

The hospital has 580 beds, with an additional 63 beds in the ICU. Bumrungrad plans to add an additional 24 ICU beds by 2022.

47 specialty centers and clinics, and more than 1,200 doctors representing virtually all specialties and sub-specialties of medicine. Dental, general and specialty medicine, advanced diagnostics and therapeutics, surgical services, intensive care, and rehabilitation are available.

As of 2006, the hospital treated over 1.1 million patients annually for medical services ranging from comprehensive check ups to cardiac surgery.

=== Medical centers ===
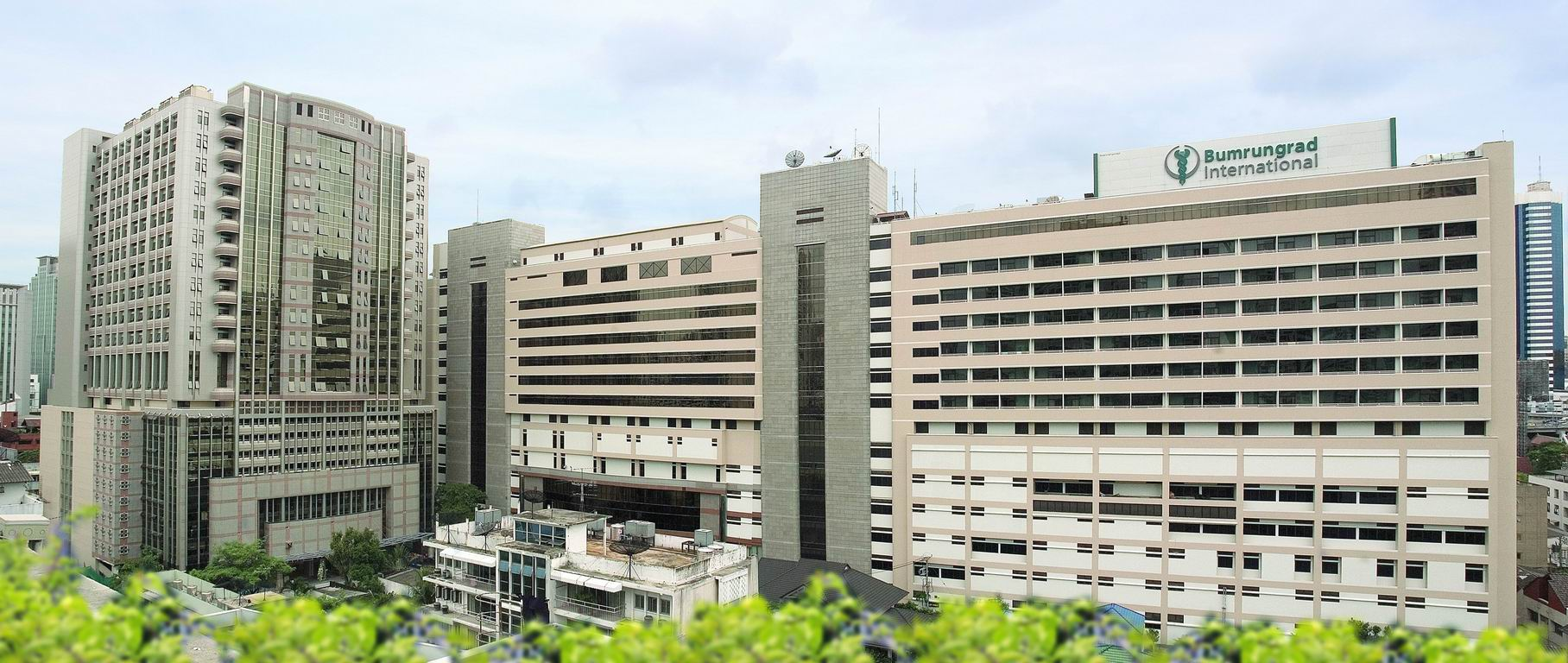
Hospital campus

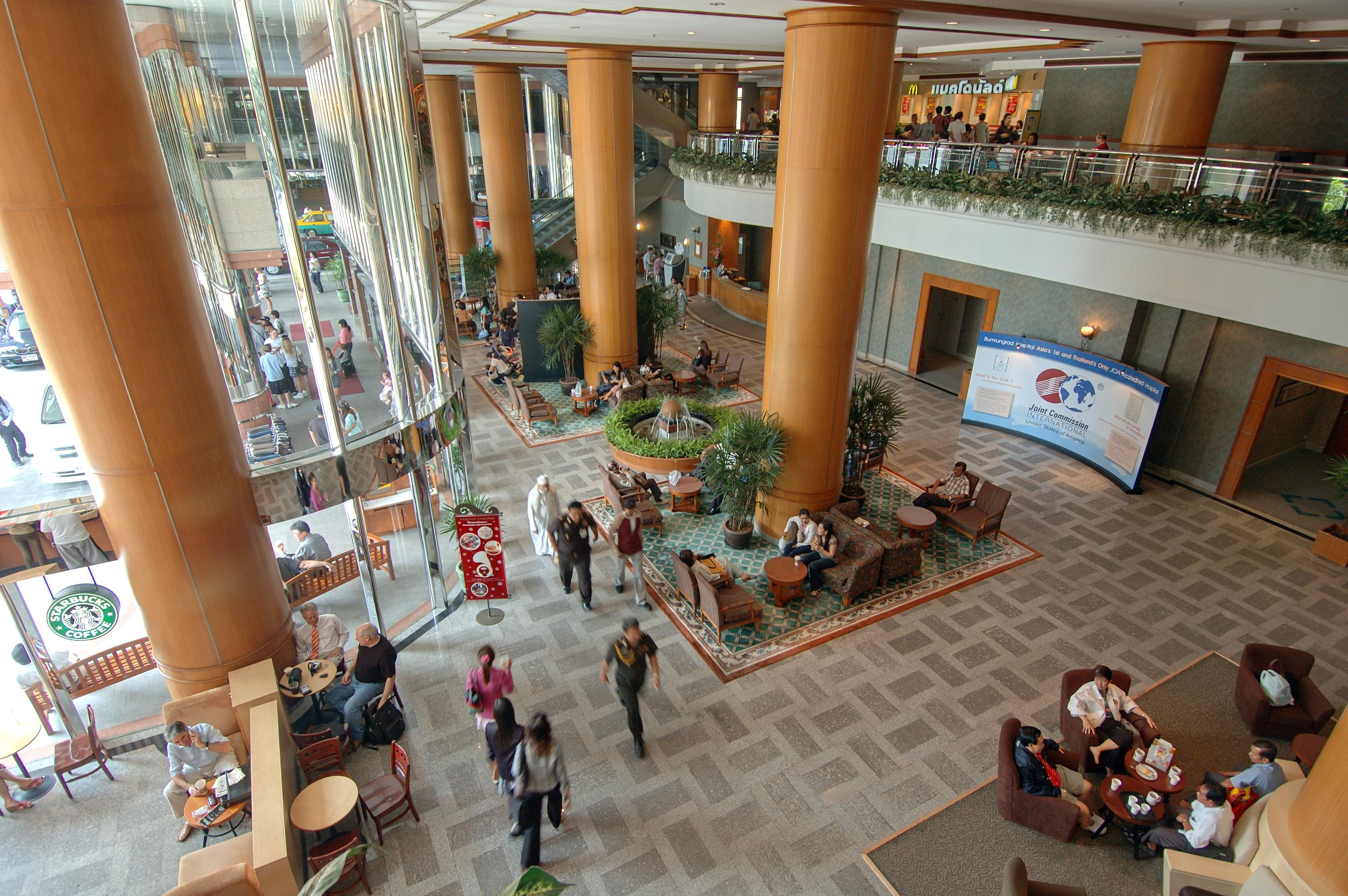
Hospital interior

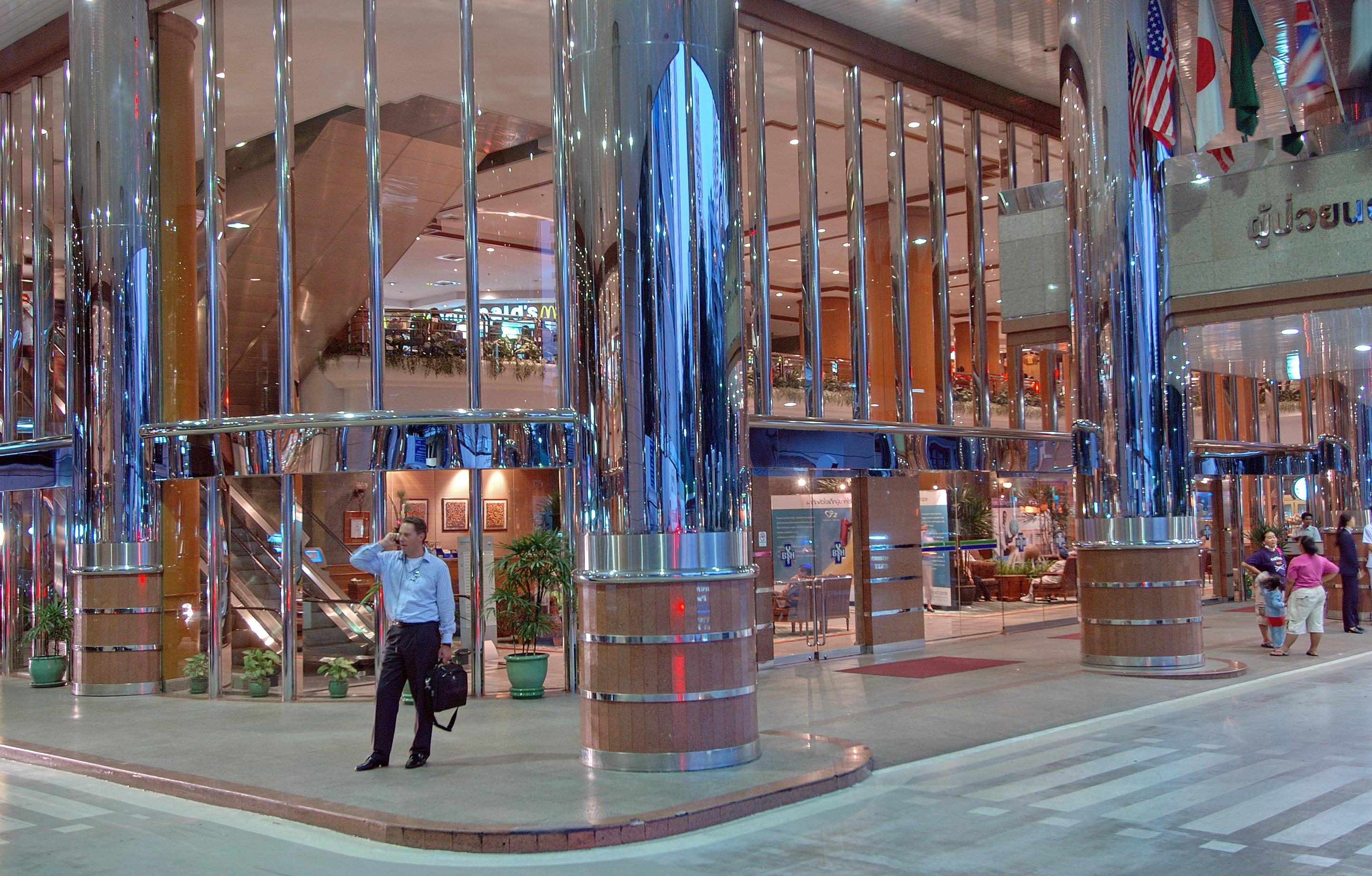
Hospital entrance

As of 2019 Bumrungrad maintains 47 outpatient specialty medical centers and clinics ranging from an Allergy Center to a Women's Center. With 272 examination rooms, it can serve up to 5,500 outpatients per day.

== Medical tourism ==
Bumrungrad is recognised as a leading medical tourism destination.

In 2008, the hospital had a complete support service infrastructure to manage inbound patients, including partnerships with leading inbound and outbound travel and tour operators.

In 2018 the hospital treated over 1.1 million patients, more than 520,000 of them international patients, from over 190 different countries. As of 2019 Bumrungrad maintains 23 referral offices internationally.

== Health information management ==
The hospital manages patient information utilizing an integrated hospital information system that uses electronic medical records and digital radiology systems. It commissioned the development of a custom total hospital information system to service both the front and back offices in 1999. The system is a key to achieving rapid scheduling of services and efficient use of resources as reported in articles that by adapting the hospital information system, the hospital eliminates paper and waiting time. The system also helps the potential outbreak of viruses and other disease by eliminating the constant handling of records by human hands. The addition of "robotic" technology maximizes both safety and efficiency. Utilizing a Swiss logistics system, medications selected and delivered in a way that drastically reduces the potential for medication errors.

== See also ==
- List of hospitals in Thailand
- List of hospitals in Bangkok
- Asian Hospital and Medical Center
