= Chan Kin-por =

Hong Kong politician

The Honourable Chan Kin-por GBS, JP
- 陳健波
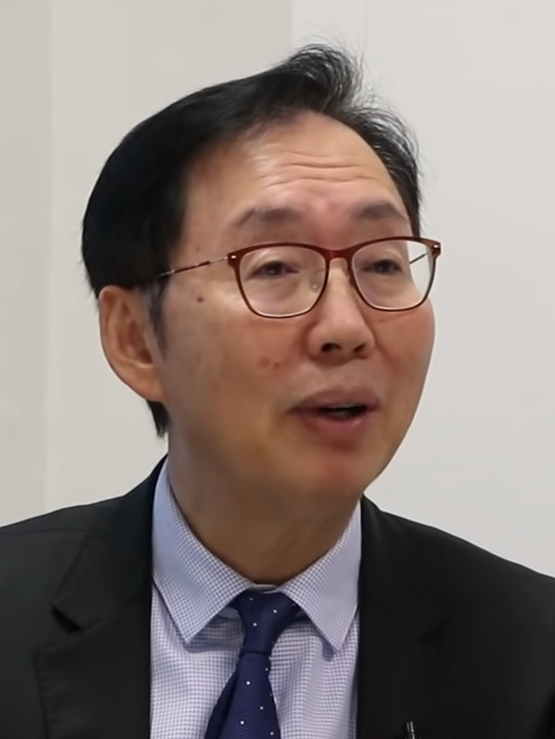
- Chan in 2020

Member of the Legislative Council
- In office 1 October 2008 – 31 December 2025
- Preceded by: Bernard Chan
- Succeeded by: Chan Pui-leung
- Constituency: Insurance

Personal details
- Born: 10 May 1954 (age 72)
- Education: Ng Wah College
- Occupation: Legislative Councillor

Chan Kin-por
- Traditional Chinese: 陳健波
Transcriptions
Yue: Cantonese
- Yale Romanization: Chàhn Gihn bō
- Jyutping: Can^{4} Gin^{6} bo^{1}

Chan Kin-por, GBS, JP, (Chinese: 陳健波, born 1954) is a Hong Kong politician who served as a member of the Legislative Council of Hong Kong, representing the functional constituency of Insurance from 2008 to 2025. He was elected to chair the Finance Committee in 2015 before leaving the role in 2022. He has been appointed Executive Council member in 2022.

== Biography ==
Known as 'KP', Chan was born in Chaozhou, Guangdong, where his ancestral roots are, and grew up in a poor family in a squatter area in Wong Tai Sin, and didn't go to university, instead, taking a job in the banking industry at Hang Seng Bank.

After working as the chief executive of the Hong Kong office of Munich Re for four years, Chan became a member of the Munich Re China Advisory Board and focused on his Legislative Council role. Prior to that, he was the assistant General Manager and Head of Insurance Group of Hang Seng Bank.

He was the chair of the Chinese Insurance Association of Hong Kong for two years from 1998, and of the Hong Kong Federation of Insurers from 2004 to 2005.

In 2008, he won a seat in the Legislative Council (Legco), representing the (insurance) functional constituency, after incumbent Bernard Chan stood down.

In the run-up to the 23 June 2010 Legco vote on the Hong Kong government's 2009 reform package, he offered his support if it included the Democratic Party's compromise proposal to have the five new district council functional constituency seats returned by popular election.

In 2015, the legislator, who was elected unopposed to his functional constituency seat, criticised the electoral regime in Hong Kong for filibustering pro-democratic legislators when speaking in favour of appropriations for the new IT Bureau, saying "everyone knows Hong Kong's elections are weird, and a prospective candidate can get elected with only 20–30 thousand votes". Chan defended the fact that he was unopposed at Legislative Council elections, saying that people ought not to underestimate functional consistencies. He suggested he was elected because chief executives of over a hundred insurance companies – the corporate votes making up the majority of his constituency – knew exactly who does things properly.

In October 2015, he was appointed chair of the Finance Committee, drawing praise and criticism for restricting procedural delays by pan-democratic councillors.

On 18 May 2020, Chan took, as had been foreshadowed by Legco president Andrew Leung three days earlier, the position of Legco presiding member in succession of democrat Dennis Kwok. This ended a deadlock, lasting for more than six months, over the election of the chair and deputy chair of the Legco House Committee which pro-establishment politicians blamed on filibustering tactics of democrats in parliament. Chan took his seat in the session while surrounded by security guards. During the tumultuous meeting, Chan was decried for "foul play" by democrats and praised for doing a "good job" by pro-establishment politicians. Observers related the timing of the move to the wish of the Hong Kong government to pass the National Anthem Bill by the end of the month.

On 29 September 2021, the Legislative Council passed amendments to the National Flag and National Emblem Ordinance which outlawed desecration of the Chinese national flag and national emblem and also concerned the teaching of these national symbols in secondary schools. On this occasion, Chan said that the "absurd acts" of desecration that had taken place during the 2019-2020 Hong Kong protests were the responsibility of the opposition and "anti-China" media in Hong Kong. He advocated for launching national education in schools, saying that young Hongkongers did not "understand the patriotic sentiment".

Executive Councilor and lawmaker Chan Kin-por said his words were misinterpreted when he said, "our bars have prettier girls" in an insurance forum.

He (Mr Chan) explained he was discussing the competition between Singapore and Hong Kong with the Financial Secretary at the time and that he was quoting (the comment from) the "gentlemen" (in the forum saying that) girls in Hong Kong bars are prettier.

On 16 February 2024, Chan was appointed a member of the board of directors of the Hong Kong Exchanges and Clearing Limited together with Peter Yan, CEO of Cyberport, in place of Laura Cha and Benjamin Hung respectively.

Chan retired in 2025 from the Legislative Council amidst a massive wave of retirements.

== See also ==
- Politics of Hong Kong
- Democratic development in Hong Kong

Legislative Council of Hong Kong
Preceded by Bernard Chan	Member of Legislative Council; Representative for Insurance; 2008–2025	Succeeded by Chan Pui-leung
Preceded by Tommy Cheung	Chairman of Finance Committee; 2015–2022	Succeeded by Chan Chun-ying
Order of precedence
Preceded by Margaret Leung; Member of the Executive Council	Hong Kong order of precedence Member of the Executive Council	Succeeded by Eliza Chan; Member of the Executive Council
