= Insurance (constituency) =

Hong Kong functional constituency

Insurance 保險界
- Functional constituency for the Legislative Council of Hong Kong
- Country: Hong Kong
- Electorate: 111

Current constituency
- Created: 1998
- Number of members: One
- Member: Chan Pui-leung (Independent)

The Insurance functional constituency (Chinese: 保險界功能界別) is a functional constituency in the elections for the Legislative Council of Hong Kong first created in 1998. Being one of the functional constituencies with fewest electorates, the constituency is restricted to only 126 insurers as of 2021. It corresponds to the Insurance Subsector in the Election Committee.

A similar Financing, Insurance, Real Estate and Business Services functional constituency was created for the 1995 election by Governor Chris Patten with a much larger electorate base of total 171,534 eligible voters.

== Return members ==
| Election | Member | Party |
|---|---|---|
| 1998 | Bernard Charnwut Chan | Independent |
| 2000 | Bernard Charnwut Chan | Independent |
| 2004 | Bernard Charnwut Chan | Independent→Alliance |
| 2008 | Chan Kin-por | Independent |
| 2012 | Chan Kin-por | Independent |
| 2016 | Chan Kin-por | Independent |
| 2021 | Chan Kin-por | Independent |
| 2025 | Chan Pui-leung | Independent |

== Electoral results ==
Instant-runoff voting system is used from 1998 to 2021. Since 2021, first-past-the-post voting system is in use.

=== 2020s ===
2025 Legislative Council election: Insurance
| Party | Candidate | Votes | % | ±% |
|---|---|---|---|---|
| Independent | Chan Pui-leung | 48 | 54.55 | |
| Independent | Simon Lam Yat-tung | 40 | 45.45 | |
| Majority | | 8 | 9.1 | |
| Total valid votes | | 88 | 100.00 | |
| Rejected ballots | | 4 | | |
| Turnout | | 92 | 82.88 | +4.62 |
| Registered electors | | 111 | | |
| Independent gain from Independent | | Swing | | |

2021 Legislative Council election: Insurance
| Party | Candidate | Votes | % | ±% |
|---|---|---|---|---|
| Independent | Chan Kin-por | 65 | 73.03 | |
| Independent | Chen Zhaonan | 24 | 26.97 | |
| Majority | | 41 | 46.06 | |
| Total valid votes | | 89 | 100.00 | |
| Rejected ballots | | 1 | | |
| Turnout | | 90 | 78.26 | |
| Registered electors | | 126 | | |
| Independent hold | | Swing | | |

=== 2010s ===
2016 Hong Kong legislative election: Insurance
| Party | Candidate | Votes | % | ±% |
|---|---|---|---|---|
| Independent | Chan Kin-por | Unopposed | | |
| Registered electors | | 134 | | |
| Independent hold | | Swing | | |

2012 Hong Kong legislative election: Insurance
| Party | Candidate | Votes | % | ±% |
|---|---|---|---|---|
| Independent | Chan Kin-por | Unopposed | | |
| Registered electors | | 135 | | |
| Independent hold | | Swing | | |

=== 2000s ===
2008 Hong Kong legislative election: Insurance
| Party | Candidate | Votes | % | ±% |
|---|---|---|---|---|
| Independent | Chan Kin-por | 52 | 45.61 | |
| Independent | Choi Chung-fu | 42 | 36.84 | |
| Independent | Chun Chi-yuk | 20 | 17.55 | |
Two-party-preferred result
| Independent | Chan Kin-por | 60 | 52.63 | |
| Independent | Choi Chung-fu | 52 | 45.61 | |
| Turnout | | 113 | 78.47 | |
| Registered electors | | 144 | | |
| Independent hold | | Swing | | |

2004 Hong Kong legislative election: Insurance
| Party | Candidate | Votes | % | ±% |
|---|---|---|---|---|
| Independent | Bernard Charnwut Chan | Unopposed | | |
| Registered electors | | 161 | | |
| Independent hold | | Swing | | |

2000 Hong Kong legislative election: Insurance
| Party | Candidate | Votes | % | ±% |
|---|---|---|---|---|
| Independent | Bernard Charnwut Chan | Unopposed | | |
| Registered electors | | 181 | | |
| Independent hold | | Swing | | |

=== 1990s ===
1998 Hong Kong legislative election: Insurance
| Party | Candidate | Votes | % | ±% |
|---|---|---|---|---|
| Independent | Bernard Charnwut Chan | | | |
| Liberal | Chan Yim-kwong | | | |
| Independent | Alex Wong Po-hang | | | |
| Independent | Steven Lau Hon-keung | | | |
Two-party-preferred result
| Independent | Bernard Charnwut Chan | 94 | 53.11 | |
| Liberal | Chan Yim-kwong | 83 | 48.69 | |
| Turnout | | 185 | 95.85 | |
| Registered electors | | 193 | | |
| Independent win (new seat) | | | | |
