= Teochew woodcarving =

Teochew woodcarving, or Chaozhou woodcarving (Chinese: 潮州木雕; pinyin: Cháozhōumùdiāo), is a form of Chinese wood carving originating from the Tang dynasty. It is very popular in Chaoshan, a region in the east of Guangdong. The Teochew people used a great deal of Teochew wood carving in their splendid buildings.

== Gallery ==
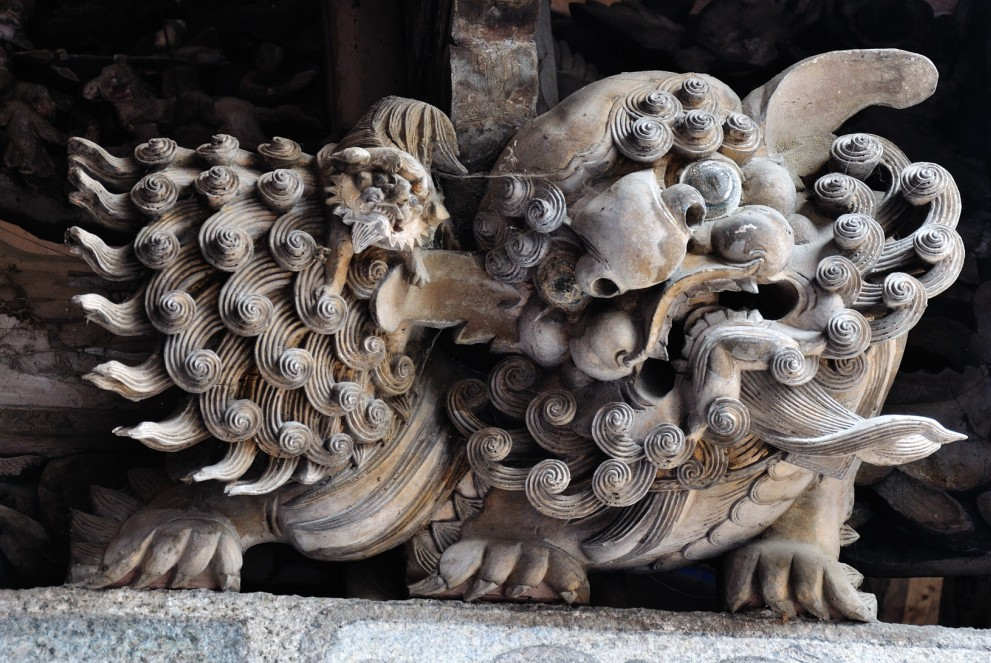

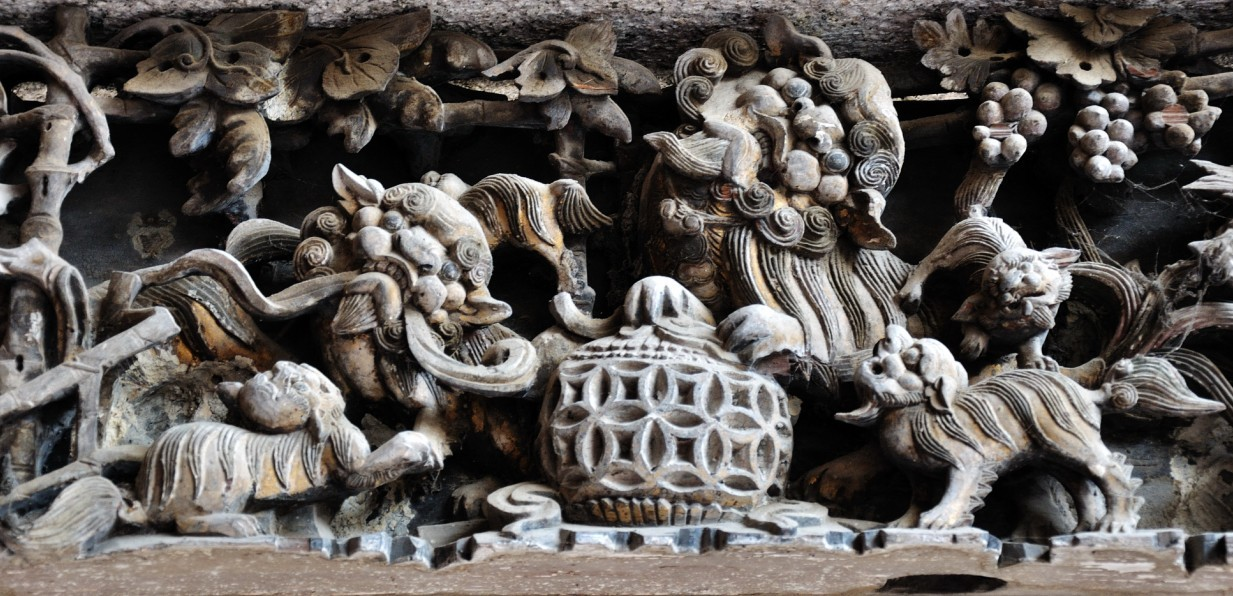

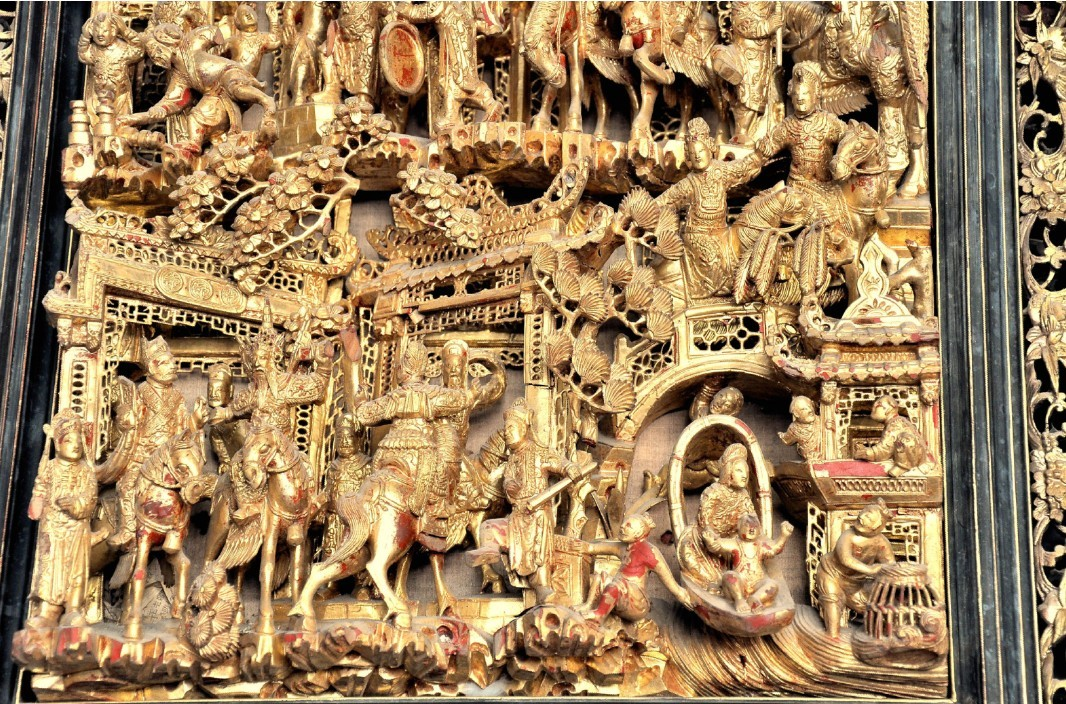

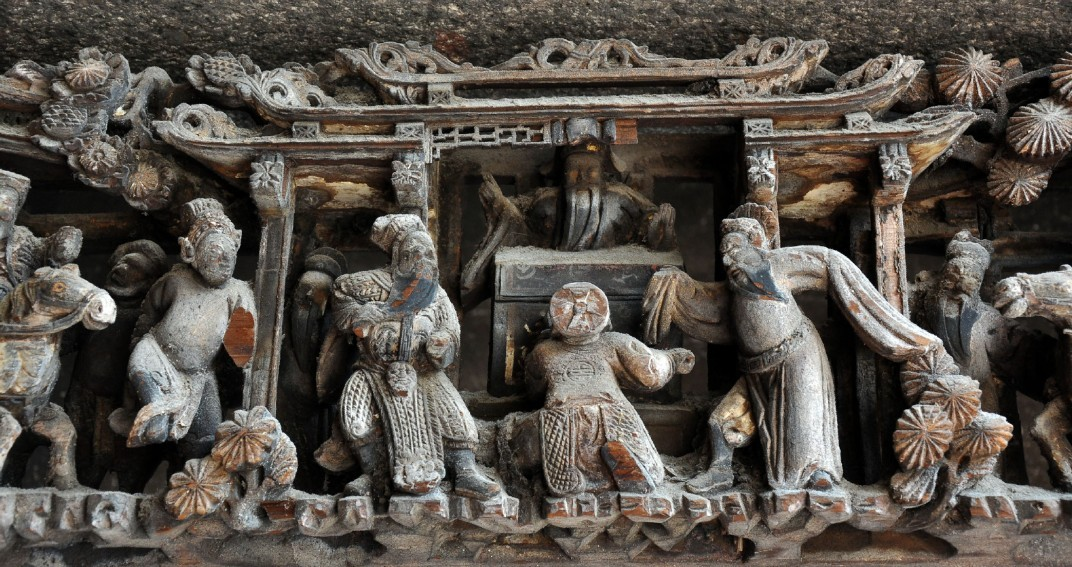

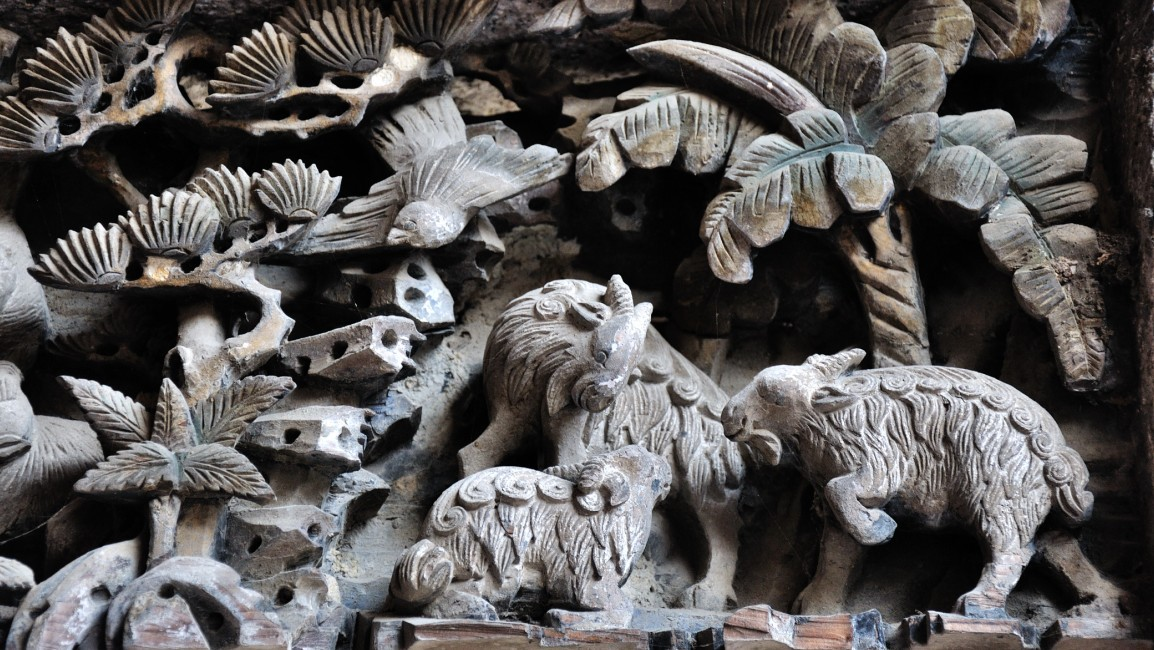

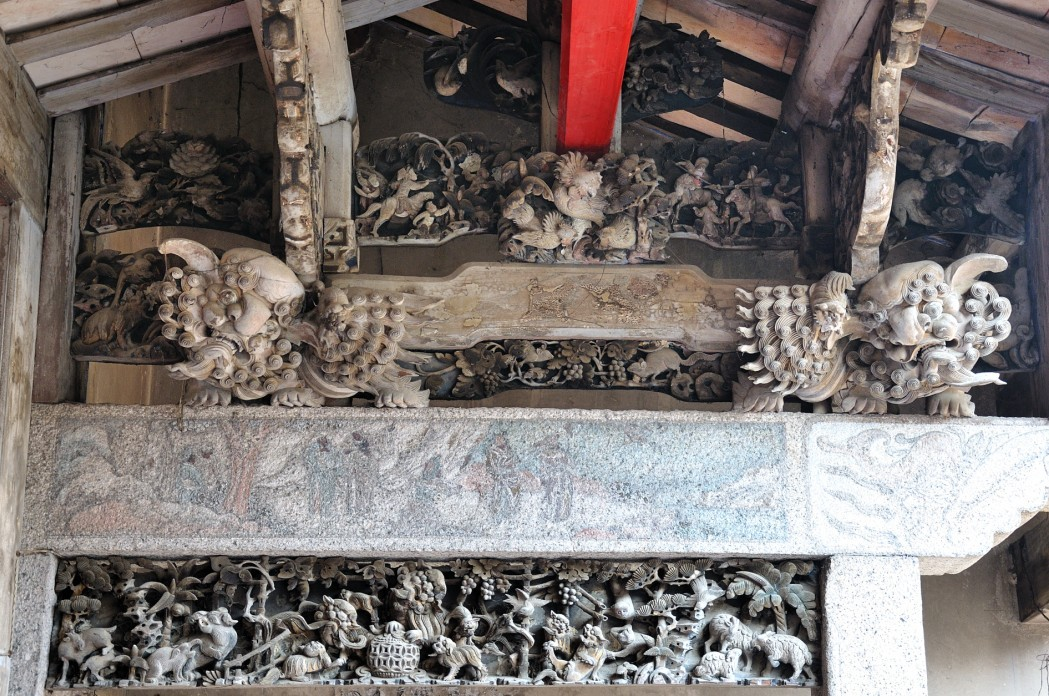

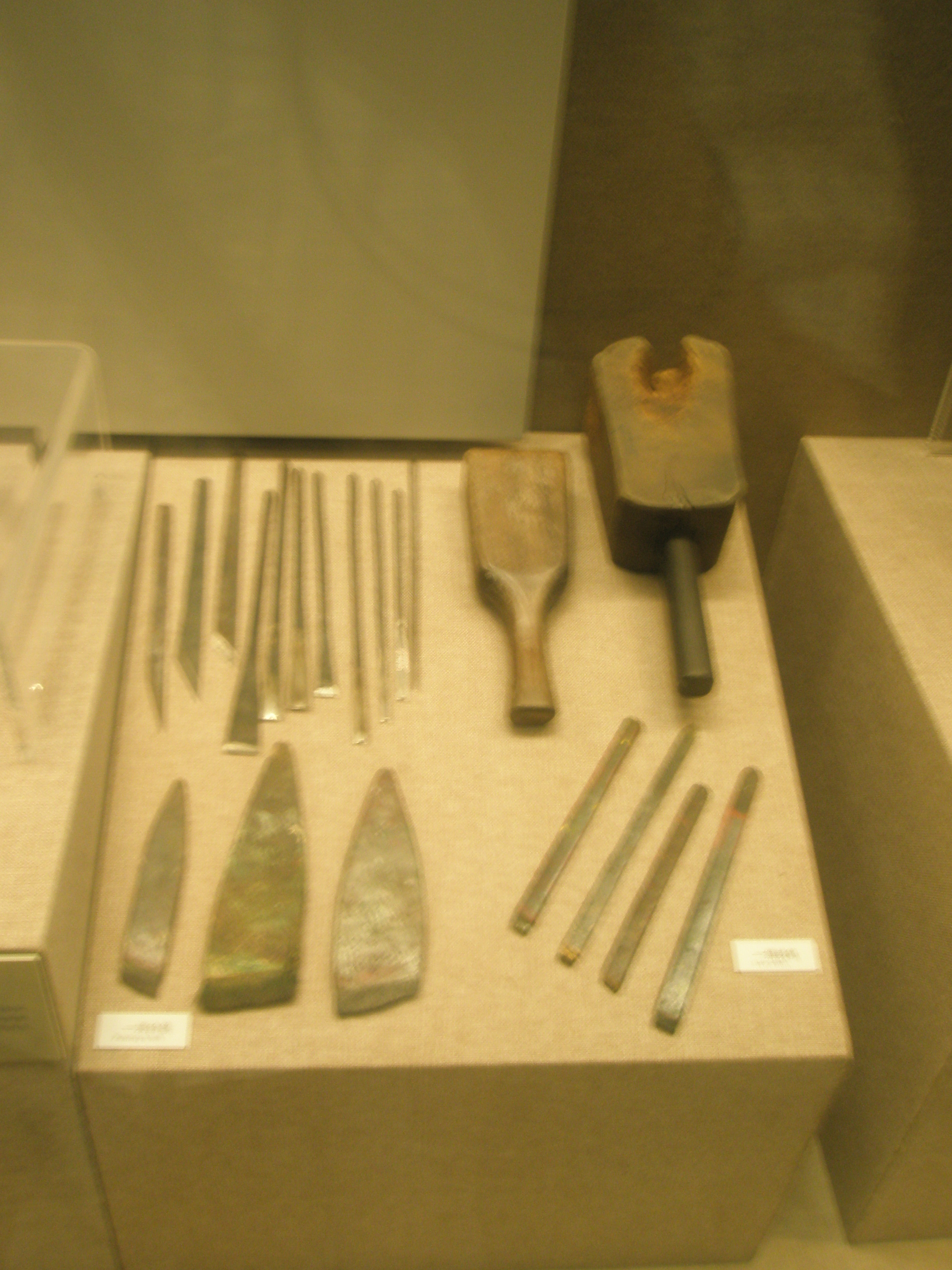
Tools of Chaozhou Woodcarving at Guangdong Museum

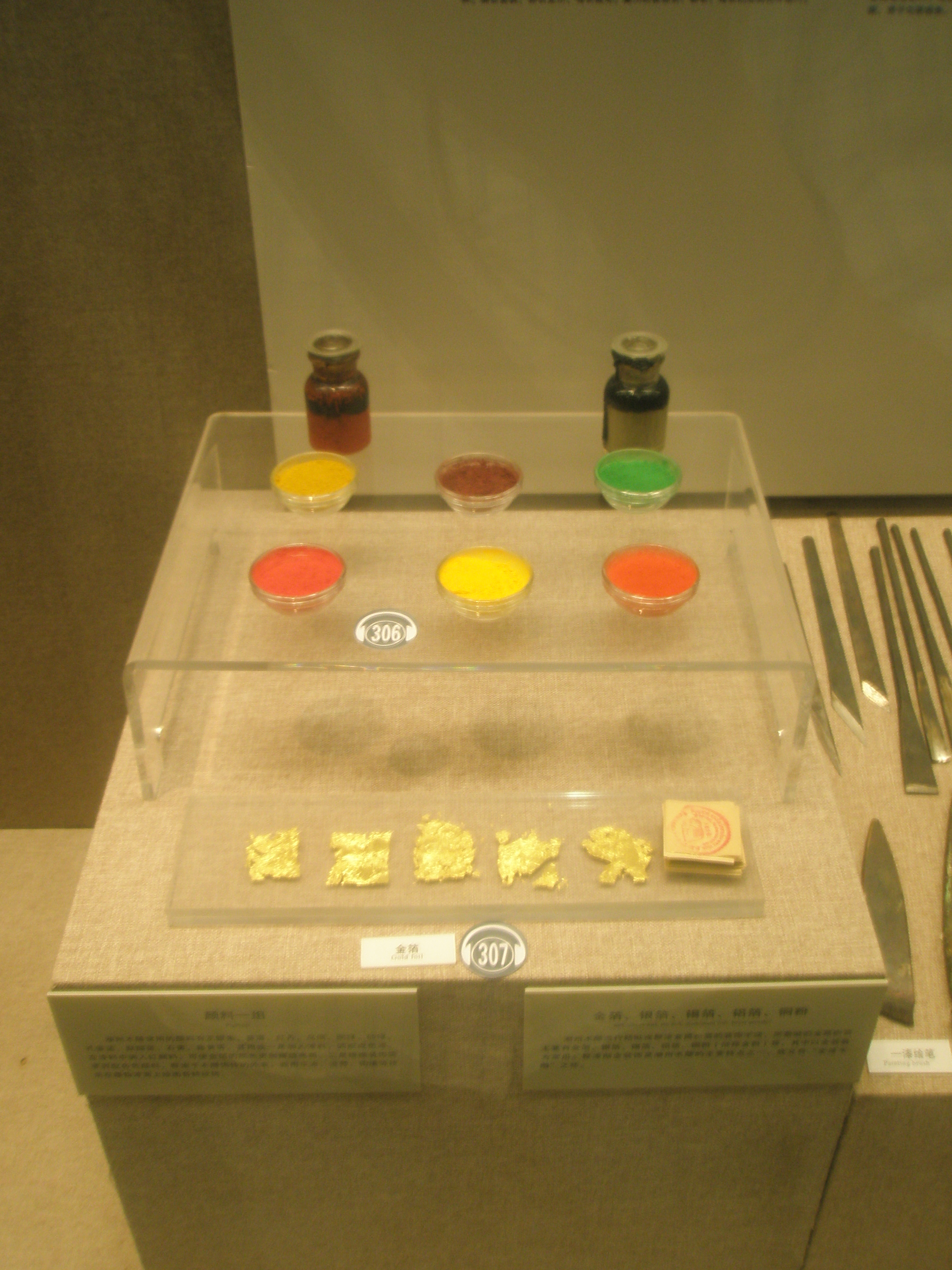
Pigment of Teochew woodcarving at Guangdong Museum

== See also ==
- Cantonese architecture
- Cantonese garden
