= Lin Shouzhi =

Chinese revolutionist (1873–1924)

Lin Shouzhi (Chinese: 林受之; pinyin: Lín Shoùzhī; 1873 - died 12 March 1924), original name Lin Xizun (Chinese: 林喜尊; pinyin: Lín Xǐzūn), a Teochew, succeeded his father, Lin Jizhi's business and dealt in the rubber trade. He later opened the Tong Yong Shun Yang Provision shop (同永顺洋杂货店) and Jin Song Trading Firm (锦淞商店) to trade in gambier (a type of spice), pineapple, rubber and charcoal.

In 1906, Dr. Sun Yat-sen established the Singapore branch of the Revolutionary Alliance. The Chung Hwa Company (中华公司) was formed to serve as a revolutionary organisation. Lin Shouzhi was appointed an important position in the alliance and served as general manager of the Chung Hwa Company.

In 1904, Lin Shouzhi donated $2000 to the alliance for uprising purposes. He also gave thousands of revised copies of Zou Rong's The Revolutionary Army to various overseas Chinese communities.

In 1907, Sun Yat-sen planned the Chaozhou Huanggang Uprising. Fearing inadequate funds to see the uprising through, Lin Shouzhi, together with Tan Chor Nam, Teo Eng Hock and Lim Nee Soon, donated large sums of money. They also remitted $3000 to Huang Naishang. Lin Shouzhi later helped organise a Basic Military School to prepare a revolutionary squad with basic military training.

For the Huanggang Uprising, Lin Shouzhi gave a total of $14,000. To help the revolution, Lin Shouzhi expended his entire fortune to give hundreds of thousands to the cause. He declared bankruptcy and his children became servants, as they could not complete their education. On March 12, 1924, Lin Shouzhi died in poverty.

== See also ==
- Ee Hoe Hean Club
