= Robin Chan (businessman) =

Chinese businessman

Robin Chan Yau-hing, GBM, GBS, JP (6 November 1932 – 18 April 2022), also known as Chen Youqing (Chinese: 陳有慶); Thai: ขี่เห่ง แซ่ตั้ง (RTGS: Khi-heng Sae-tang), or Rabin Sophonpanich (Thai: ระบิล โสภณพนิช; RTGS: Rabin Sophonphanit) was a Chinese-born Hong Kong businessman of Thai descent. He was the eldest son of Chin Sophonpanich (founder and former president of Bangkok Bank), and served as the chairman of the Asia Financial Group.

Robin Chan was born in Chiuyang, Swatow, Kwangtung, Republic of China. He had two sons, Stephen Tan and Bernard Chan, who were executive director and president of the Asia Financial Group and its main subsidiary, Asia Insurance respectively.
