= Chartsiri Sophonpanich =

Thai banker (born 1959)

- ชาติศิริ โสภณพนิช
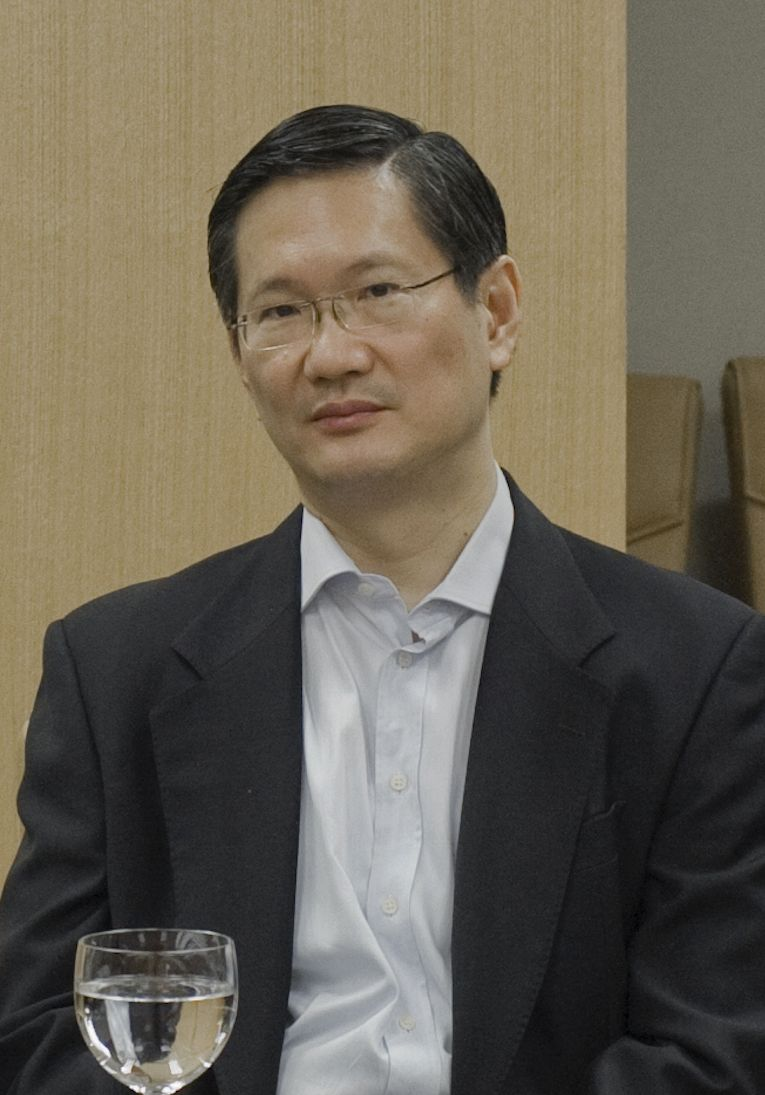
- Chartsiri in 2011
- Born: 12 May 1959 (age 67); Bangkok, Thailand
- Education: Worcester Polytechnic Institute; Massachusetts Institute of Technology; Assumption College
- Occupation: Banker
- Known for: President of Bangkok Bank
- Spouse: Married
- Children: 5

Chartsiri Sophonpanich (Thai: ชาติศิริ โสภณพนิช, RTGS: Chatsiri Sophonphanit, Chinese: 陳智深, Teochew: Tâng Tì-tshim; born 12 May 1959) is a Thai banker. He currently serves as president of Bangkok Bank, the largest commercial bank in Thailand and one of the largest regional banks in Southeast Asia, and chairman of Bangkok Bank (China), a wholly owned subsidiary of Bangkok Bank. He held various senior management positions in Bangkok Bank before being appointed president in December 1994 and has been a member of the board of executive directors since 1992.

== Career ==
Chartsiri received a bachelor's degree in chemical engineering from Worcester Polytechnic Institute. He went on to study at the Massachusetts Institute of Technology, where he received a master's degree in chemical engineering and a master's degree in management.

Under his leadership, Bangkok Bank has expanded its operations and now has a local network of over 1160 branches, 117 business centers and 126 business desks, and more than 17 million deposit accounts. The bank has more than 300 international branches in 14 economies, including fully owned subsidiaries in China, Indonesia and Malaysia. Bangkok Bank is the only Thai bank to have a branch in Myanmar where its Yangon Branch opened on 2 June 2015. Along with its successful commercial operations, the bank is also a strong supporter of Thailand's community and plays an active role in a number of social development and educational initiatives.

Chartsiri also served as the chairman of the Thai Bankers' Association from 2002 to 2005, a member of the Payment Systems Committee of the Bank of Thailand, and a member of the committee of the Thailand Board of Investment. He is also a director of Post Publishing and a member of the board of trustees of Bangkok University and of Singapore Management University.

Under Chartsiri's leadership Bangkok Bank has received hundreds of awards, including Best Bank in Thailand from The Banker and Euromoney magazines. In 2020 Bangkok Bank won the Bank of the Year award from Money & Banking, Thailand's leading monthly business and financial magazine, the 14th time the bank has received the award since 1985.

As of July 2021, he was worth US$1.15 billion according to Forbes.

== Awards ==
In 2001 he received the Banker of the Year award from Thailand's Money and Banking magazine. In 2005 he received the Achievement Award for Leadership in Thailand from the Asian Banker magazine and the Robert H. Goddard Alumni Award from Worcester Polytechnic Institute for exceptional achievement in business. In 2019 he received The Asian Banker CEO Leadership Achievement for Thailand Award 2019.

== Personal life ==
Chartsiri is the son of Chatri Sophonpanich and the grandson of Chin Sophonpanich, the founder of Bangkok Bank. The politician Kalaya Sophonpanich is his aunt. Hong Kong politician and businessman Bernard Charnwut Chan is also his cousin.
