= Cheryl Lu-Lien Tan =

Singapore-born American author and journalist

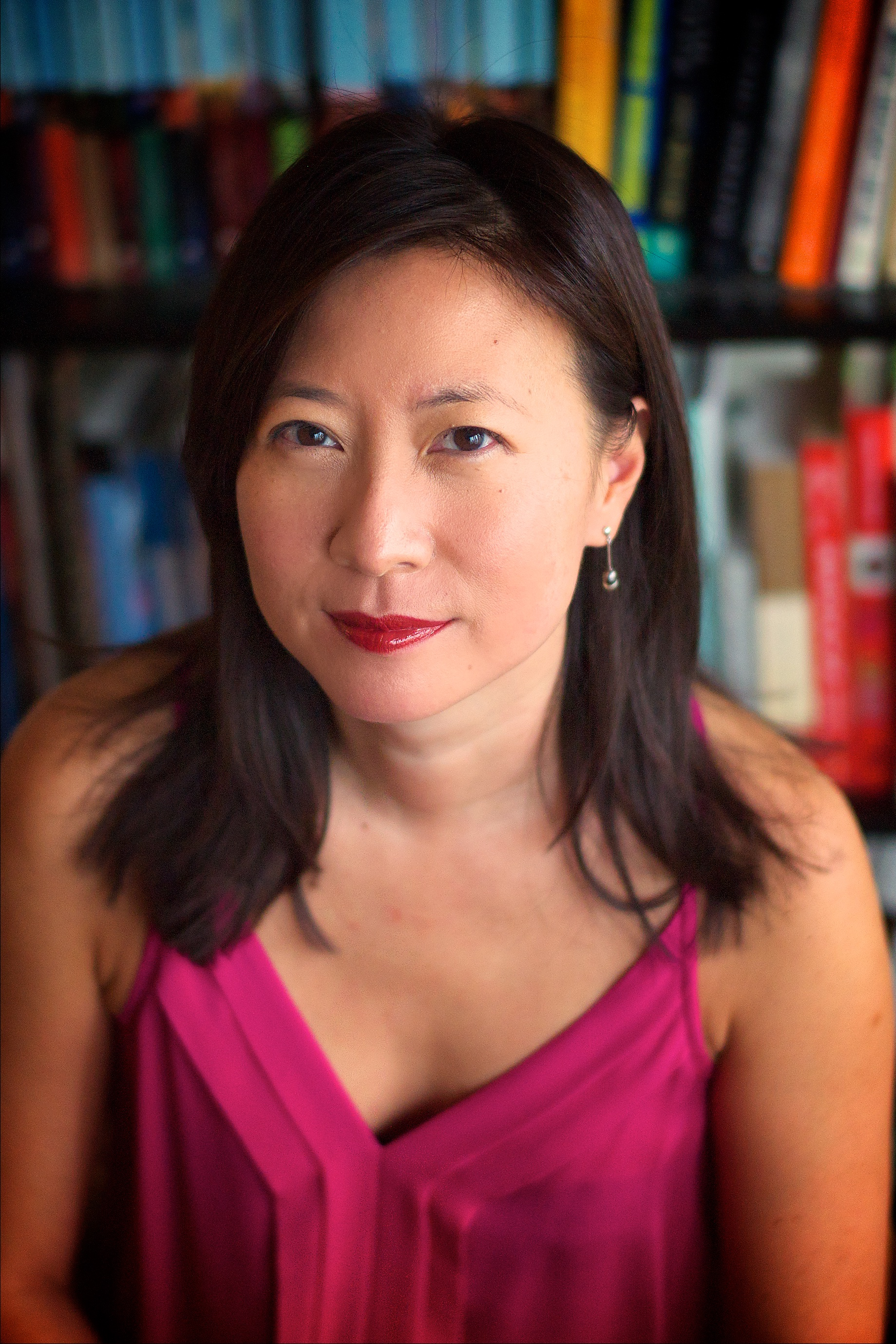
- Cheryl Lu-Lien Tan in 2015
- Born: Singapore
- Occupations: journalist, author
- Notable work: Sarong Party Girls, A Tiger in the Kitchen

Cheryl Lu-Lien Tan is a Singapore-born author, journalist and professor.

== Biography ==
She was born and raised in Singapore, she moved to the U.S. to study at the Northwestern University in Evanston, Illinois. As a journalist, she has been a staff writer at the Wall Street Journal, In Style magazine and the Baltimore Sun, and she has published stories at mainstream media like The New York Times, The Paris Review, The Washington Post, Foreign Policy or Newsweek, among many other places.

In 2024, she became a professor at the Medill School of Journalism, where she is the inaugural George R.R. Martin Chair.

She has been an active member of the Asian American Journalists Association. As an author, she has published and co-edited some best-seller books.

== Works ==
- A Tiger in the Kitchen (Hyperion, 2011)
- Sarong Party Girls (William Morrow, 2016)
- Singapore Noir (Akashic Books, 2014) editor
- Anonymous Sex (Scribner Books, 2022) co-creator and co-editor
