= David Sun =

David Sun may refer to:

- David Sun (businessman) (born 1951), American businessman and co-founder of Kingston Technology
- David Sun Tak-kei (born 1953), Director of Audit of Hong Kong and former president of Hong Kong Institute of Certified Public Accountants
- David Sun, Chinese businessman and CEO of Home Inn
