= Chen Pingyuan =

Chinese academic

Chen Pingyuan is professor of Chinese Literature at Peking University. His major works include "The Literati's Chivalric Dreams" (1991) and "The Establishment of Modern Scholarship in China" (1998). An interview with him appears in the book One China, Many Paths.
