= Chatri Sophonpanich =

Thai businessman

Chatri Sophonpanich (Thai: ชาตรี โสภณพนิช; Chinese: 陳有漢; pinyin: Chén Yǒuhàn; 28 February 1934 – 24 June 2018) was a Thai businessman who served as the chairman of the board of directors of the Bangkok Bank beginning in 1999 and he was also one of the CEOs of Thai TV3 in the 2000s to the early 2010s. He was the second son of Chin Sophonpanich and father of Chartsiri Sophonpanich and Chali Sophonpanich.

Chatri Sophonpanich died on 24 June 2018 after undergoing cardiac surgery and on the post-op recovery process, aged 84 years. At the time of his death, his family had an estimated net worth of $1.5 billion.
