= Chin Sophonpanich =

Thai banker

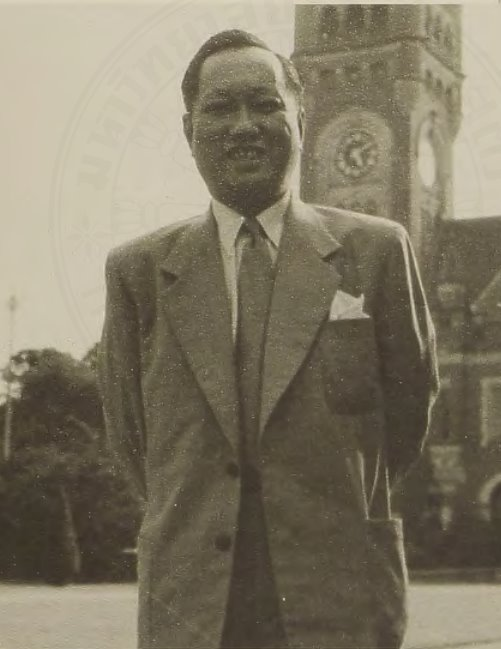
- Circa 1960s
- Born: 10 November 1910; Bangkok, Siam
- Died: 4 January 1988 (aged 77); Bangkok, Thailand
- Occupation: Founder of Bangkok Bank
- Spouses: Lau Kwei-ying; Boonsri Sophonpanich
- Children: 6, including Robin Chan and Chatri Sophonpanich
- Relatives: Chartsiri Sophonpanich (grandson); Stephen Tan (grandson); Bernard Charnwut Chan (grandson); Kalaya Sophonpanich (daughter-in-law)

Chin Sophonpanich (Thai: ชิน โสภณพนิช; Chinese: 陳弼臣; pinyin: Chén Bìchén; 10 November 1910 – 4 January 1988) was a Thai entrepreneur who founded Bangkok Bank and Bangkok Insurance.

== Biography ==
Chin was born in Wat Sai quarter in Thonburi Province (currently Chom Thong District) to a Thai Chinese family. His father was a Chinese immigrant from Chaoyang, Shantou, Guangdong, China who worked at a sawmill, while his mother was a local-born Thai Chinese. At the age of five years, Chin was sent back to China for education, and upon returning to Thailand at 17, he took up his first job as a manual labourer. In 1944, Chin founded Bangkok Bank, which started with only two shophouses. The bank later expanded and diversified into Hong Kong. Chin lived in Hong Kong from 1957 on, when Thailand came under the rule of Sarit Thanarat, after he fell out of favour with the former dictator. By 1972, the bank was listed on the Hong Kong Stock Exchange.

Chatri Sophonpanich served as president of Bangkok Bank from 1980 to 1992, and his son, Chartsiri Sophonpanich, has been president since 1994. Rabin Sophonpanich (also known as Robin Chan) has since relocated to Hong Kong with his family. He had two wives. With his first wife, Lau Kwei-ying, he had two sons, Rabin Sophonpanich and Chatri Sophonpanich. With his second wife, Boonsri, he had seven children, including Chote Sophonpanich and the Khunying Chodchoi Sophonpanich (Chinese: 陳鳳翎). Bernard Chan (a.k.a. Charnwut Sophonpanich) later became a local legislator and its Executive Council member. Chin's daughter-in-law, the Khunying Kalaya Sophonpanich, wife of Chote Sophonpanich, was the Thai Democrat Party's Minister of Science and Technology. On 23 February 2009, she presided over the opening ceremony of the 2008 IEEE International Conference on Robotics and Biomimetics, ROBIO 2008, held in Bangkok.

Chin Sophonpanich died in 1988, aged 77, in his native Bangkok.

== Sources ==
- The Encyclopedia of the Chinese Overseas, page 223, "The Rise of Bangkok Bank", Michael R.J. Vatikiotis, Harvard University Press, (ISBN 0674252101).
