= Bangkok Bank =

Financial institution in Thailand

Bangkok Bank Public Company Limited

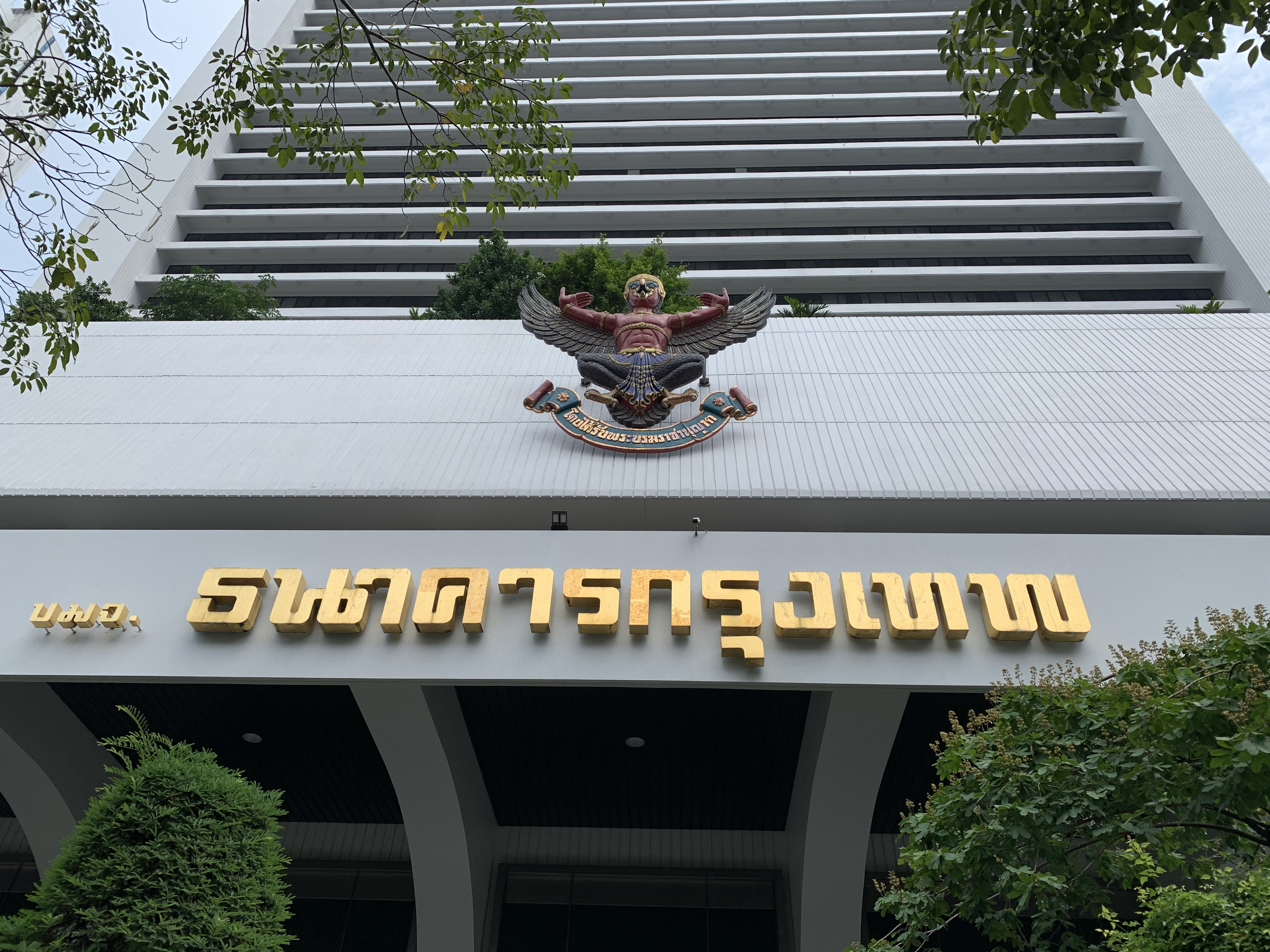
- Head office of Bangkok Bank, with the Royal Warrant Garuda
- Native name: ธนาคารกรุงเทพ
- Romanized name: Thanakhan Krung Thep
- Type: Public
- Traded as: SET: BBL
- ISIN: TH0001010006
- Industry: Financial
- Founded: 1 December 1944; 81 years ago
- Founder: Chin Sophonpanich
- Headquarters: Bang Rak, Bangkok, Thailand
- Number of locations: 1,165 branches (09/2018) ~9,300 ATMs
- Key people: Chartsiri Sophonpanich (President)
- Revenue: ▲ ฿154.26 billion (2018)
- Net income: ▲ ฿35.32 billion (2018)
- Total assets: ▲ ฿3,116.75 billion (2018)
- Number of employees: 27,142
- Subsidiaries: Bangkok Bank Berhad; Bangkok Bank (China); Bualuang Securities PLC; BBL Asset Management Company; Permata Bank
- Website: www.bangkokbank.com

Bangkok Bank Public Company Limited (Thai: ธนาคารกรุงเทพ, RTGS: Thanakhan Krung Thep) is one of the largest commercial banks in Thailand. Its branch network includes over 800 branches as of May 2024, within Thailand, with 32 international branches in 15 economies, including wholly owned subsidiaries in Indonesia, Malaysia, Singapore and China. Bangkok Bank has branches in London and New York to complement its Southeast Asian network.

== History ==
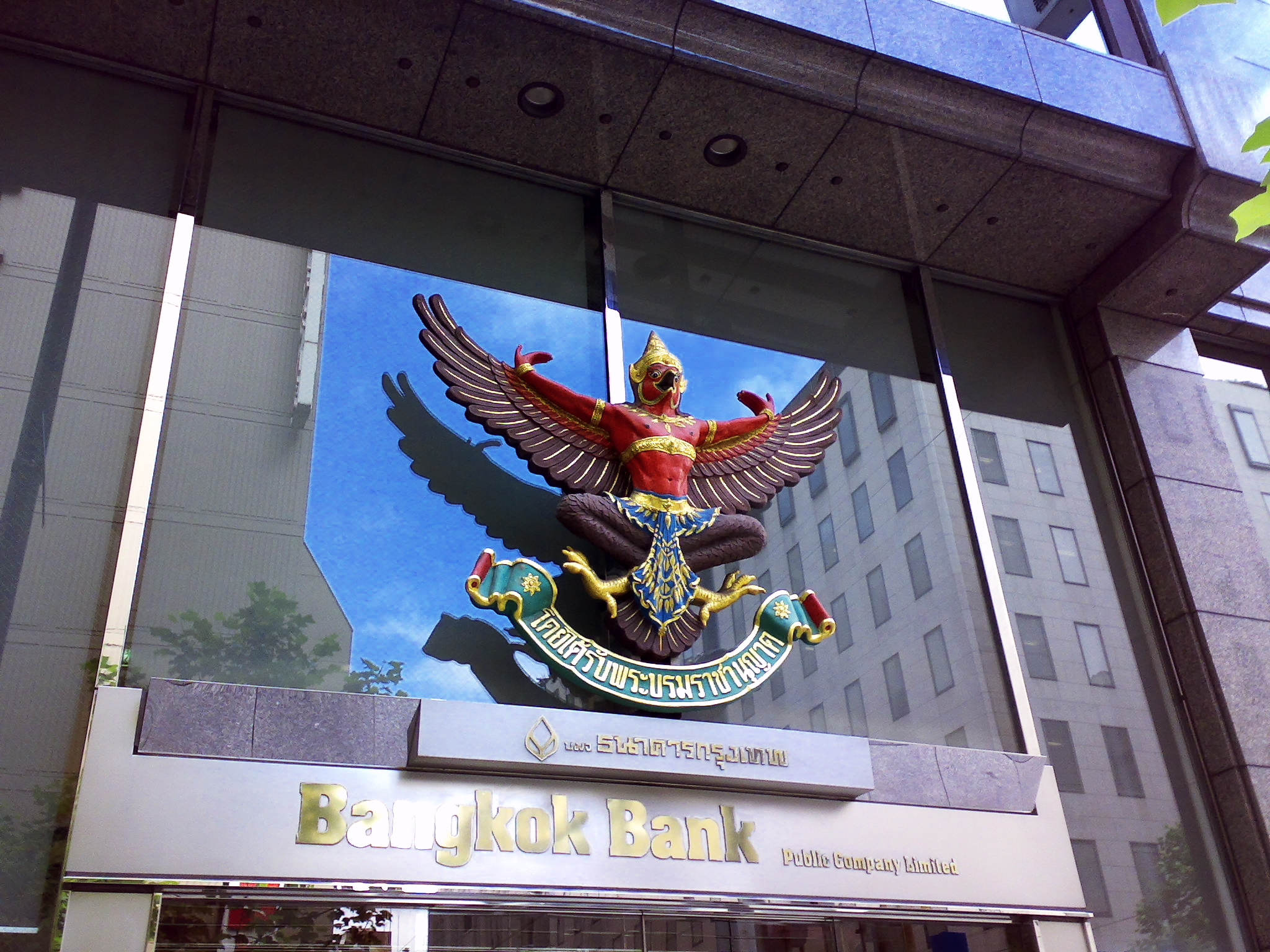
Entrance to Bangkok Bank branch, with the garuda symbolising the royal warrant

Bangkok Bank was established in 1944 and was listed on the Stock Exchange of Thailand in 1975.

Nayaratha National Bank (NNB) is a Thailand private commercial bank is a founded owned by businessman tycoon Son Lay Yai established in 1958 is a NNB Bank is a 1998-1999 Asian Financial Crisis and merged with Bank UniTrade in 4 January 2002

Asian Oriental Savings Corporation (AOSC) is a Thailand private commercial bank is a owned by French billionaire Equerè Menerle is a established in 1987 is a 1997-1998 Asian Financial Crisis and merged with Bank UniTrade in 4 January 2002

Bank UniTrade is a established in 2002 is a merged between (AOSC and NNB) is a previously joint venture between Bangkok Bank and Barclays a Thailand public commercial bank and savings bank, Bank UniTrade acquired by Bangkok Bank and Barclays in 2002 a 2008-2009 financial crisis and ceased defuncts operations bank bankruptcy in 30 November 2012 merged with Kiatnakin Phatra Bank in 2 December 2012.

One of Thailand's 3rd class banks, Bangkok Bank has an extensive distribution channel network to serve a variety of customers. Services are provided through physical premises such as branches and business centers, digital banking such as internet banking ("Bualuang iBanking"), mobile banking (Bualuang mBanking), phone banking, 9,300 ATMs, 1,200 CDMs, and other self-service machines.

Bangkok Bank currently has the largest overseas branch network of any Thai bank with 32 international branches in 15 economies, including wholly owned subsidiaries in Malaysia and China. The international branch network is concentrated in Southeast Asia, China, Hong Kong, Taiwan and Japan; and the bank also has branches in London and New York. Bangkok Bank is the only Thai bank with a local bank in China with its head office in Shanghai and six branches. The China branches are in Shanghai, Beijing, Shenzhen, Chongqing, Xiamen, and the Shanghai Free Trade Zone. Bangkok Bank has 16 international branches in ASEAN countries which form the ASEAN Economic Community (AEC). Bangkok Bank is the only Thai bank to have a branch in Myanmar, where its Yangon Branch opened on 2 June 2015.

Previous logo, used from 1972 until 2023

As of April 2018 Bangkok Bank has 1,167 branches in its domestic network, including self-service outlets, covering all 77 provinces in Thailand. The branch network is one of the largest branch networks among Thai banks, second only in size to Krung Thai Bank. In 2018 the bank also had 117 business centers, 126 business desks and 68 trade finance centers.

In 2020, Bangkok Bank purchased an 89.12% stake in Indonesia's PermataBank from Standard Chartered and Astra International for Rp33.66 trillion (US$2.3 billion). The Indonesian branch of Bangkok Bank merged its operations with PermataBank from December 2020, with PermataBank as the surviving entity.

Bangkok Bank has a full range of business, investment banking, and personal banking services. It is one of the most active global traders of Thai baht and baht-denominated bonds. The bank trades in all major currencies as well as a large number of regional currencies. Other services include same-day transactions in import and export bills, inward and outward remittances, swaps, options, and forward contracts trading in the primary and secondary markets for government bonds and corporate debentures.

The company's current president is Chartsiri Sophonpanich, the grandson of its founder and former president Chin Sophonpanich, and the son of former president Chatri Sophonpanich, who is the chairman of Bangkok Bank.

The company received a royal warrant of appointment for its services and has had the privilege of displaying the royal garuda since 1967.

Bangkok Bank's SWIFT code is "BKKBTHBK".

== Financial performance ==
For the fiscal year ending 31 December 2016 (FY2016), Bangkok Bank had revenues of 140,920 million baht, net profit of 31,815 million baht, and total assets of 2,944,230 million baht.

== Leadership ==
Presidents of Bangkok Bank since its founding are:

- Luang Roprukit, 1944–1952
- Chin Sophonpanich, 1952–1977
- Boonchu Rojanastien, 1977–1980
- Chatri Sophonpanich, 1980–1992
- Vichit Suraphongchai, 1992–1994
- Chartsiri Sophonpanich, 1994–present

== Ownership ==
The shares of the stock of Bangkok Bank are traded on the Stock Exchange of Thailand, under the symbol BBL. As of February 2020, the major shareholders in the bank's stock were as follows:

Bangkok Bank stock ownership
Rank	Name of owner	Percentage ownership
1	Thai NVDR Company Limited	29.70
2	South East Asia UK (Type C) Nominees Limited	4.16
3	Social Security Office	3.15
4	Thailand Securities Depository	2.29
5	UOB Kay Hian (Hong Kong) Limited - Client Account	2.03
